= Architecture of Liverpool =

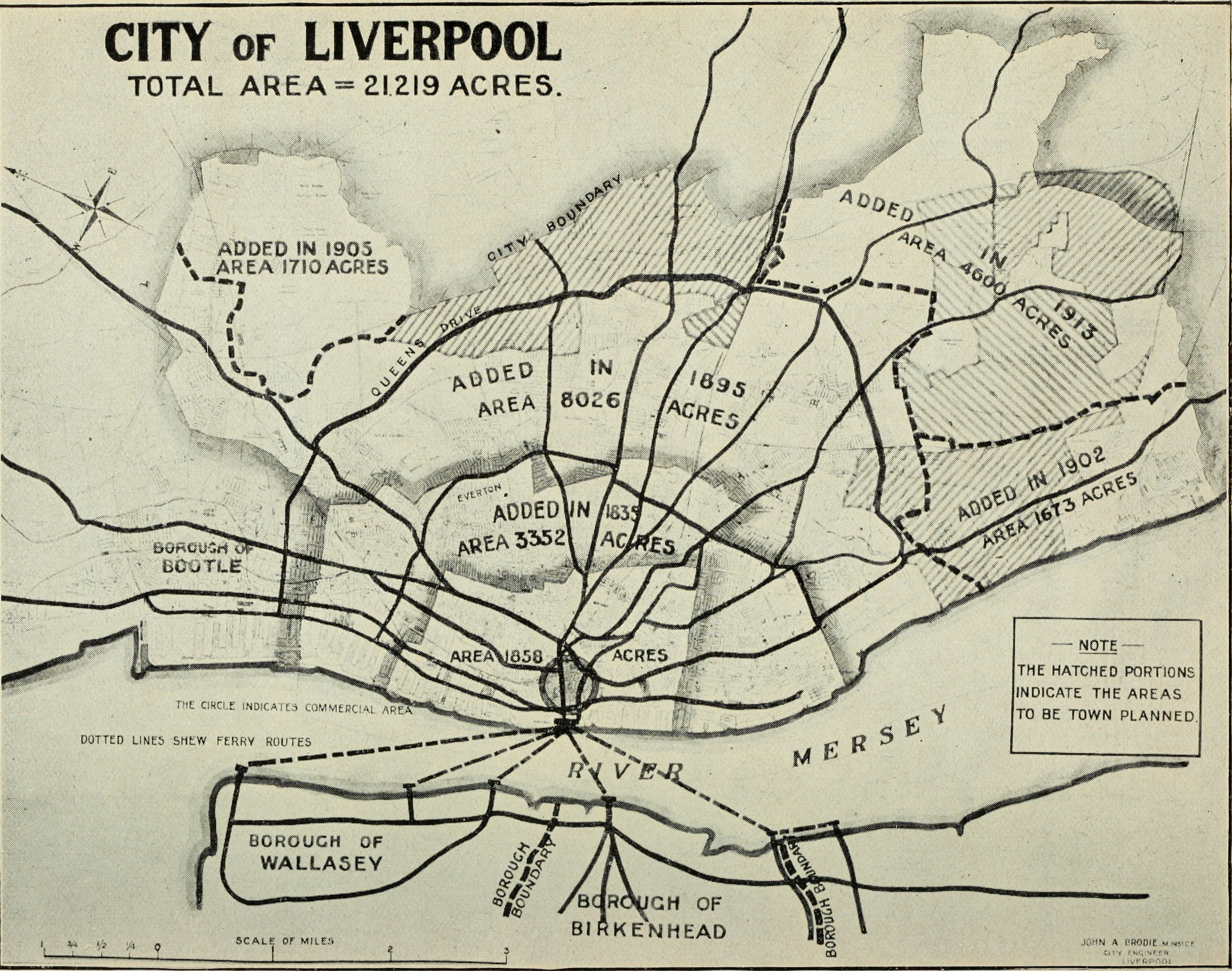
Map of Liverpool of 1914 showing how the city boundaries expanded over time

The architecture of Liverpool is rooted in the city's development into a major port of the British Empire. It encompasses a variety of architectural styles of the past 300 years, while next to nothing remains of its medieval structures which would have dated back as far as the 13th century. Erected 1716–18, Bluecoat Chambers is supposed to be the oldest surviving building in central Liverpool.

There are over 2500 listed buildings in Liverpool of which 27 are Grade I and 105 Grade II* listed. It has been described by English Heritage as England's finest Victorian city. However, due to neglect, some of Liverpool's finest listed buildings are on English Heritage's Heritage at Risk register. Though listed buildings are concentrated in the centre, Liverpool has many buildings of interest throughout its suburbs.

In accordance with Liverpool's role as a trading port, many of its best buildings were erected as headquarters for shipping firms and insurance companies. The wealth thus generated led to the construction of grand civic buildings, designed to allow the local administrators to "run the city with pride".

The historical significance and value of Liverpool's architecture and port layout were recognised when, in 2004, UNESCO declared large parts of the city a World Heritage Site. Known as the Liverpool Maritime Mercantile City, the nomination papers stress the city's role in the development of international trade and docking technology, summed up in this way under Selection Criterion iv: "Liverpool is an outstanding example of a world mercantile port city, which represents the early development of global trading and cultural connections throughout the British Empire." Following developments such as Liverpool Waters and Everton Stadium, the World Heritage Committee removed Liverpool's World Heritage Site status in July 2021.

As Liverpool grew in population, it absorbed certain surrounding areas which now act as its various inner districts (Clubmoor, Edge Hill, Everton, Fairfield, Garston, Kensington, Kirkdale, Knotty Ash, Norris Green, Old Swan, Toxteth, Vauxhall, Walton, Wavertree) or outlying suburbs (Aigburth, Allerton, Anfield, Childwall, Croxteth, Fazakerley, Gateacre, Grassendale, Hunt's Cross, Mossley Hill, St Michael's Hamlet, West Derby, Woolton), with varying architecture in each.

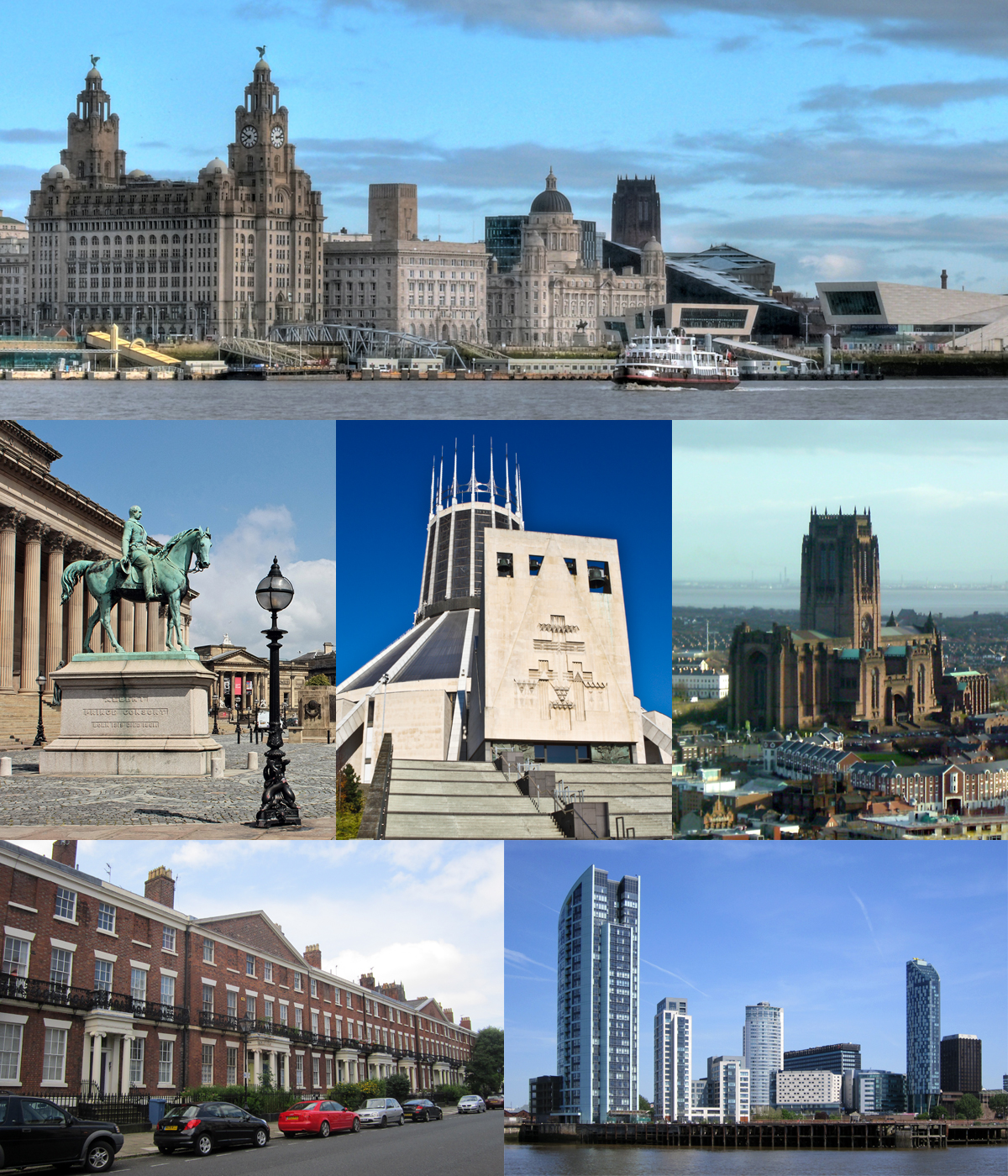
Montage of Liverpool

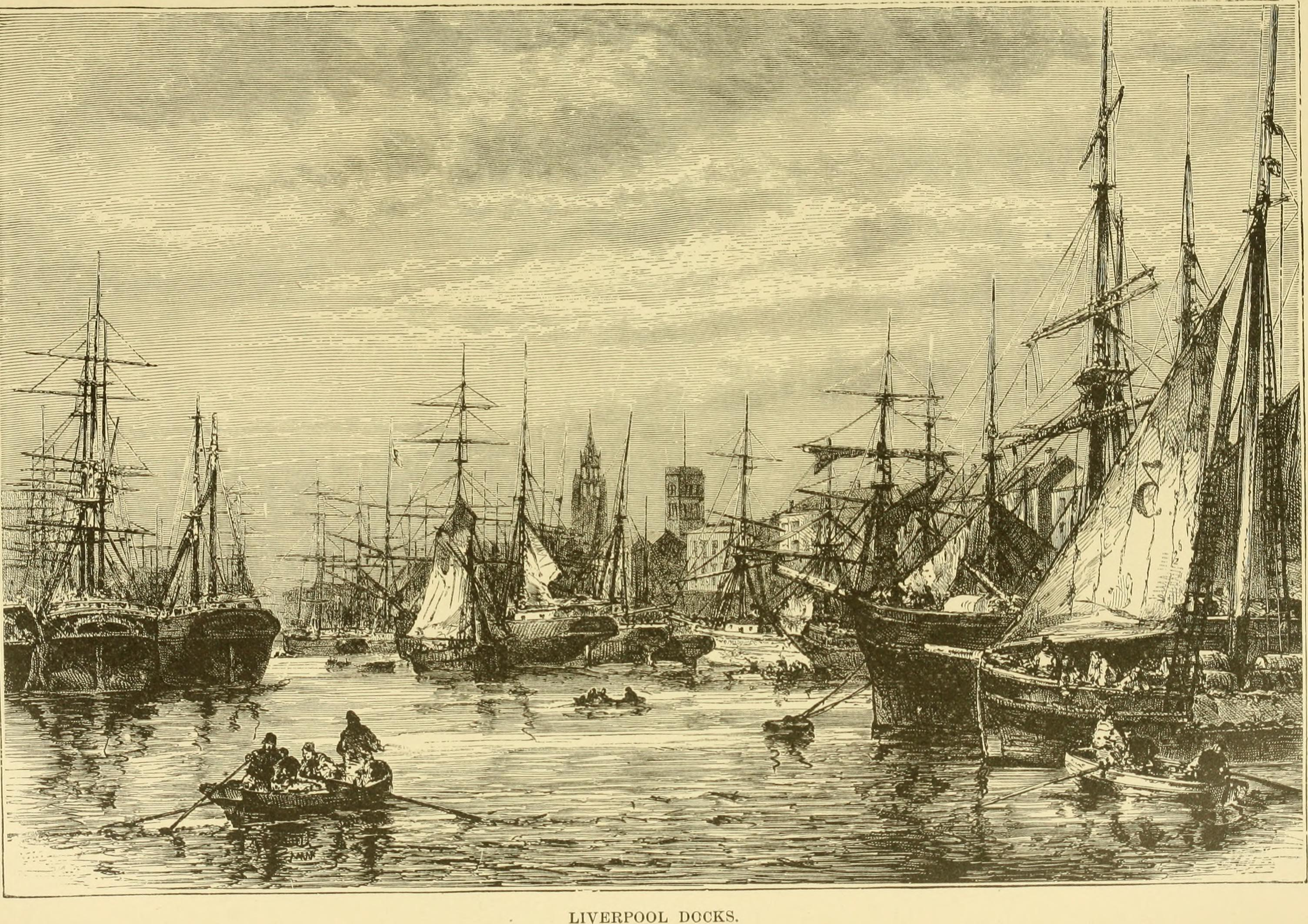
Liverpool Docks 1881

== Medieval (11th century – 1485) ==
Liverpool's origins date back to at least c. 1192 when it was first mentioned and was made a borough in 1207 by King John, although today nothing remains of the city's medieval architecture. Probably the earliest building of note within Liverpool would have been Liverpool Castle, which was constructed between 1232 and 1235 by William de Ferrers. In 1257 mention of the chapel of St Mary del Key near the water's edge, gave its name to Chapel Street. The church of Our Lady and St Nicholas was originally built c.1360, though none of the fabric of the medieval church survives, Sir John Stanley was granted permission in 1406 to fortify his house at the bottom of Water Street, but again this doesn't survive. The oldest surviving building within the city is likely to be Stanlawe Grange in Aigburth, a Monastic grange dating from the 13th century. Frequent modifications throughout its history mean that little of the original building remains, although sections of it are believed to date from 1291. The only medieval church within the current bounds of Liverpool is All Saints' Church, Childwall, The chancel dates from the 14th century, and the south aisle and porch are probably from the 15th century, the tower and spire date from 1810 to 1811. The north aisle dates from 1833 and it was partly rebuilt between 1900 and 1905. Despite the lack of many physical remnants of this period, the city's medieval history is still evident in the street patterns around Liverpool Town Hall, with all seven of the city's original streets remaining in approximately the same position today. These are Chapel Street, Tithebarn Street, Dale Street, Water Street, Old Hall Street, High Street & Castle Street. In this early period of Liverpool's history trade was confined to coastal trade, trade with Ireland and other European nations.

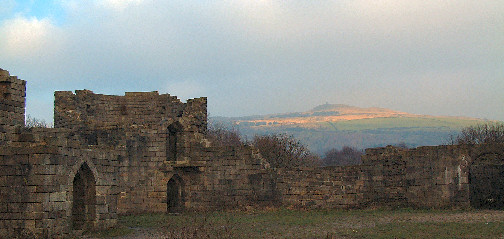
Full size replica of Liverpool Castle at Rivington, never completed
(1912–25)

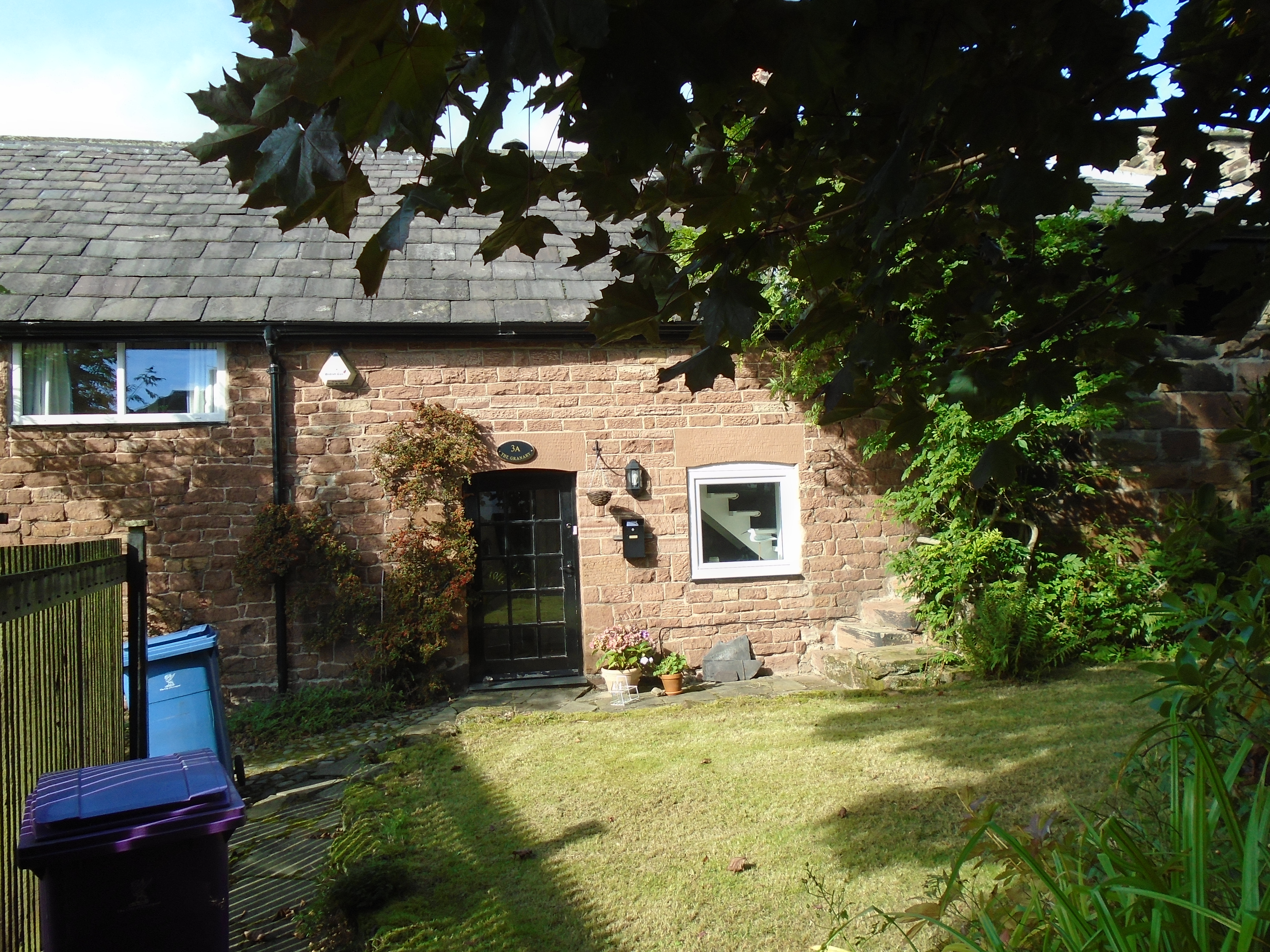
Stanlawe Grange, Aigburth Hall Avenue, Aigburth
(13th century and later; Grade II*)

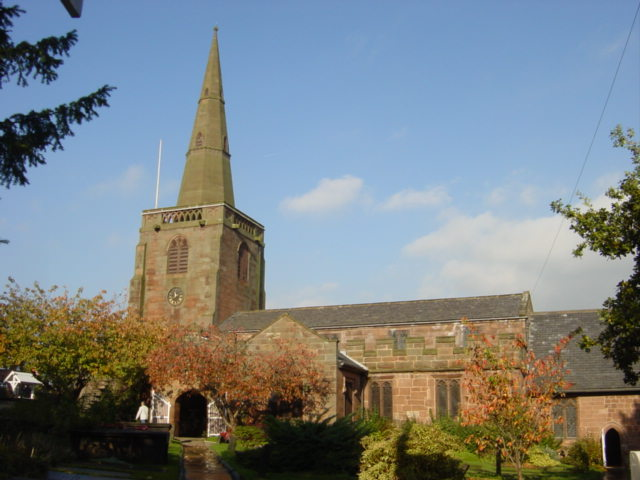
All Saints' Church, Childwall
(14th, 15th & 19th centuries; Grade I)

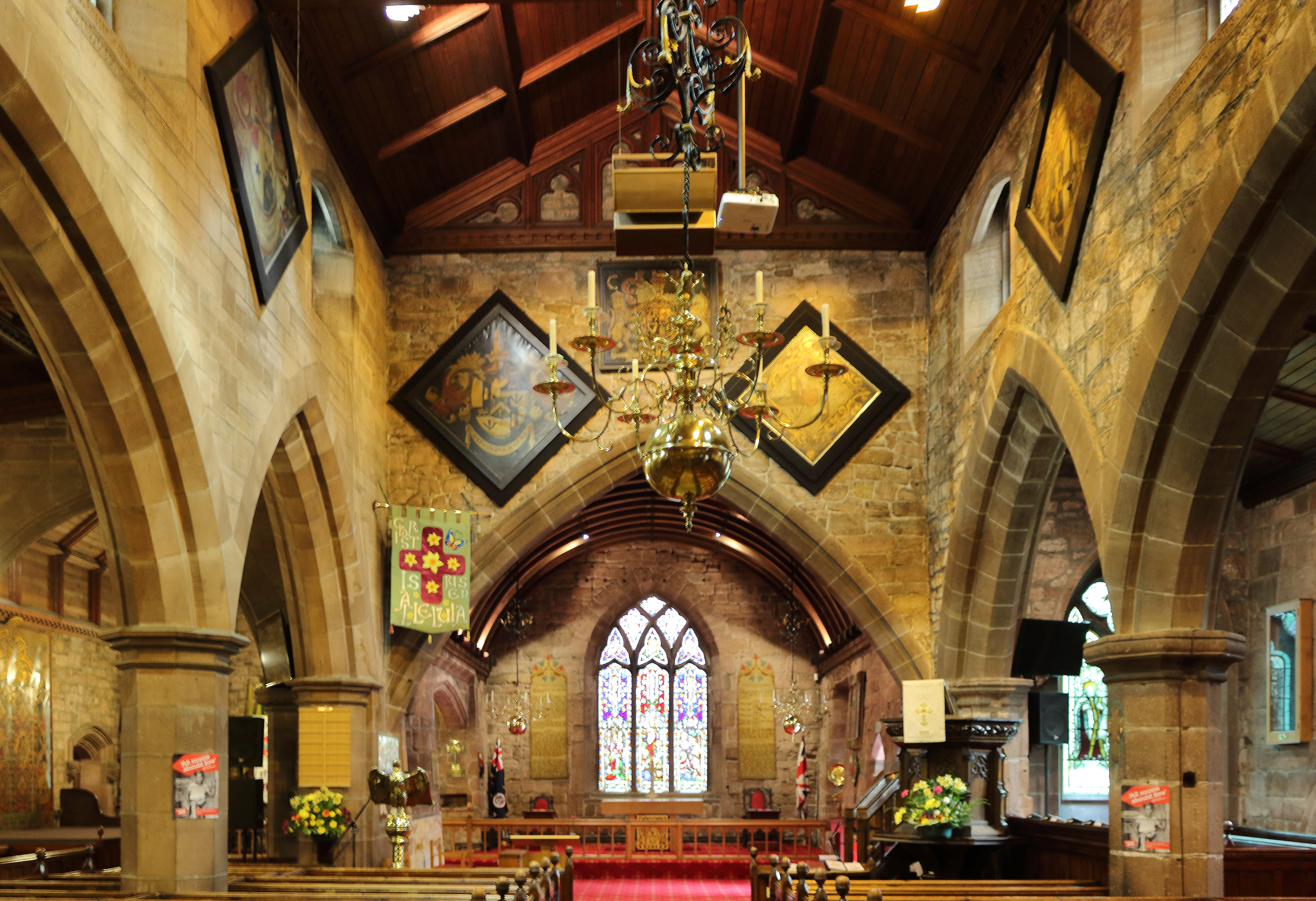
Interior, All Saints' Church, Childwall
(14th, 15th & 19th centuries; Grade I)

== Tudor and Elizabethan (1485–1603) ==
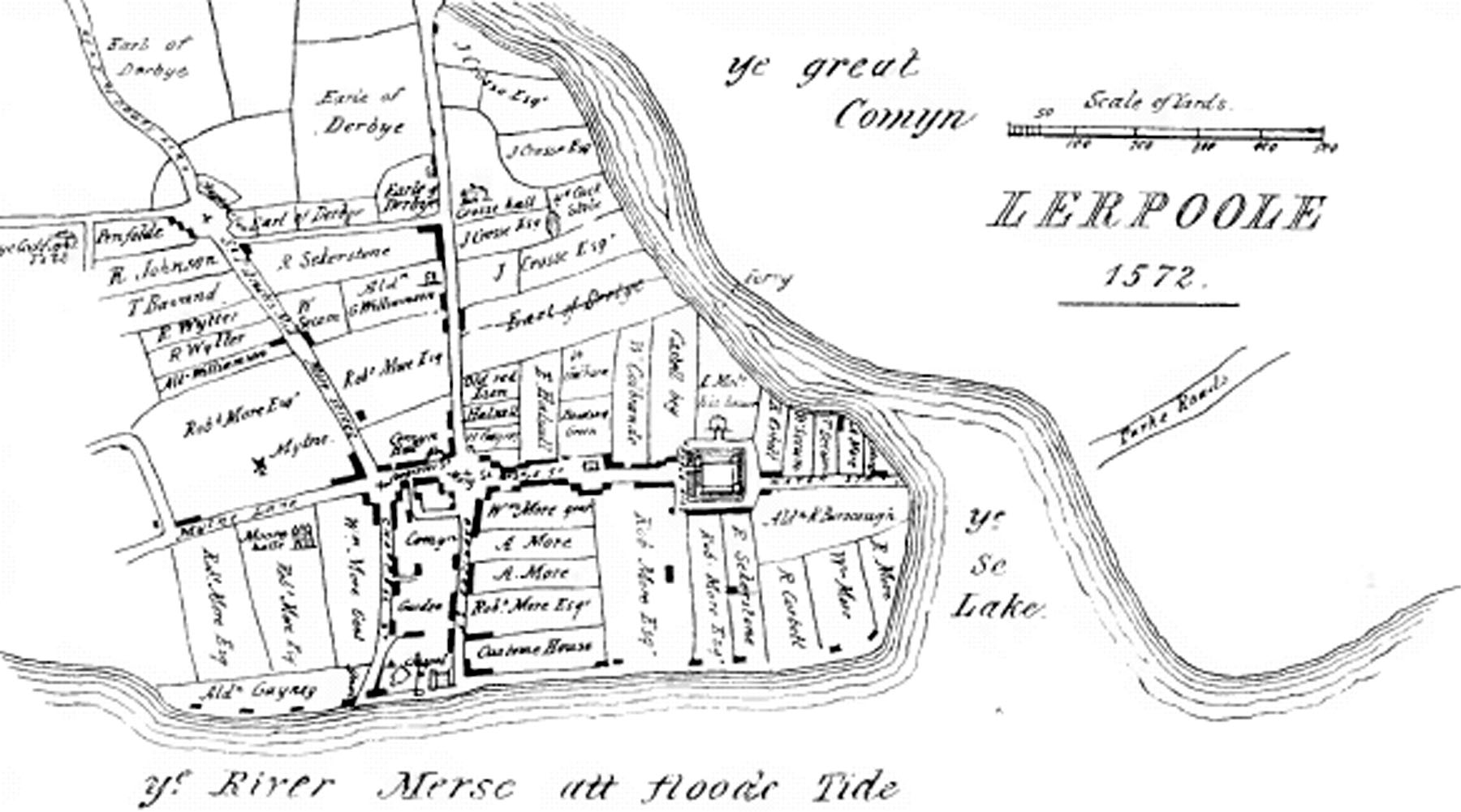
Map of Liverpool in 1572

Liverpool's first Town Hall—the town council used to meet in the common hall from 1350—was built in 1515 at the bequest of Rev. John Crosse, and was located in the block bounded by High Street, Dale Street and Exchange Street East. The building was replaced in 1673 by a new Town Hall, partly built on the site occupied by the current building. Speke Hall, which is located in the south of the city, is a manor house from the 16th century, completed in 1598: much of the building is earlier. It is one of the few remaining timber framed Tudor houses in the North of England and it is noted for its Victorian interior.

Another large manor house from this period is Croxteth Hall, the ancestral home of the Molyneux family, started in 1575. Just one wing of the building dates from this period, and most of the house was completed during the 18th and 19th centuries. It mixes styles including Elizabethan, Queen Anne Style and Georgian.

The Old Grammar school near St Mary's Church, Walton-on-the-Hill is dated c.1600.

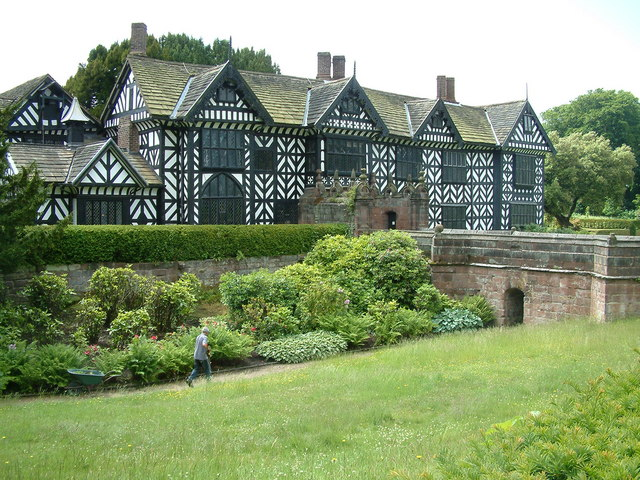
Speke Hall
(1530–98; Grade I)

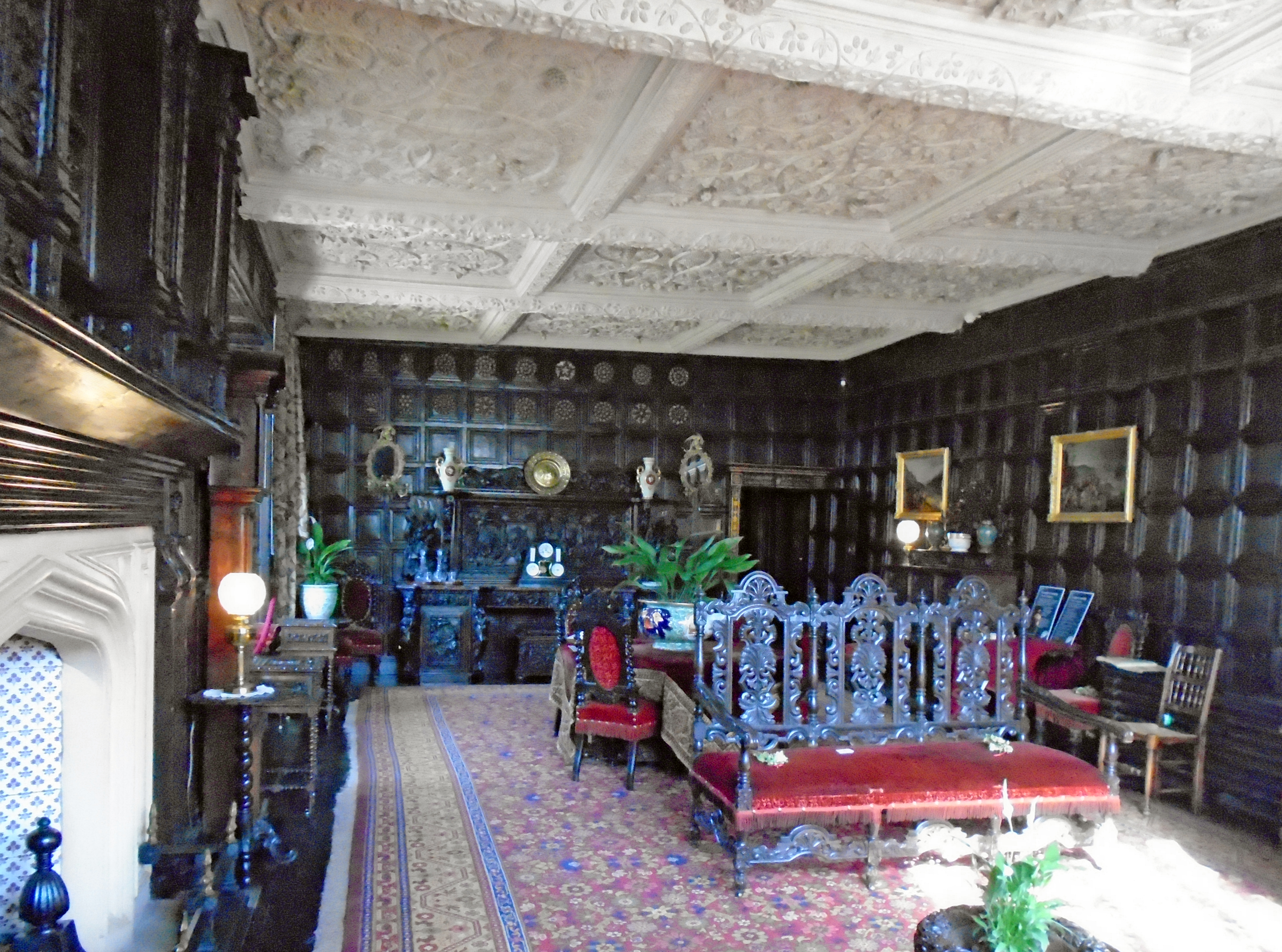
The Great Parlour, Speke Hall
(c.1531; Grade I)

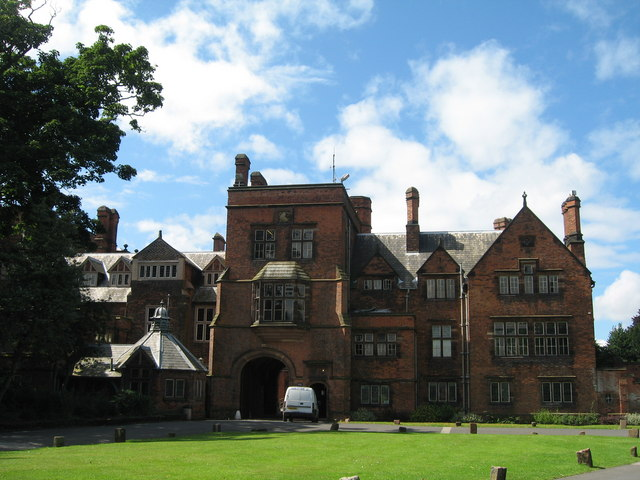
Croxteth Hall
(1575; Grade II*)

== Stuart (1603–1714) ==
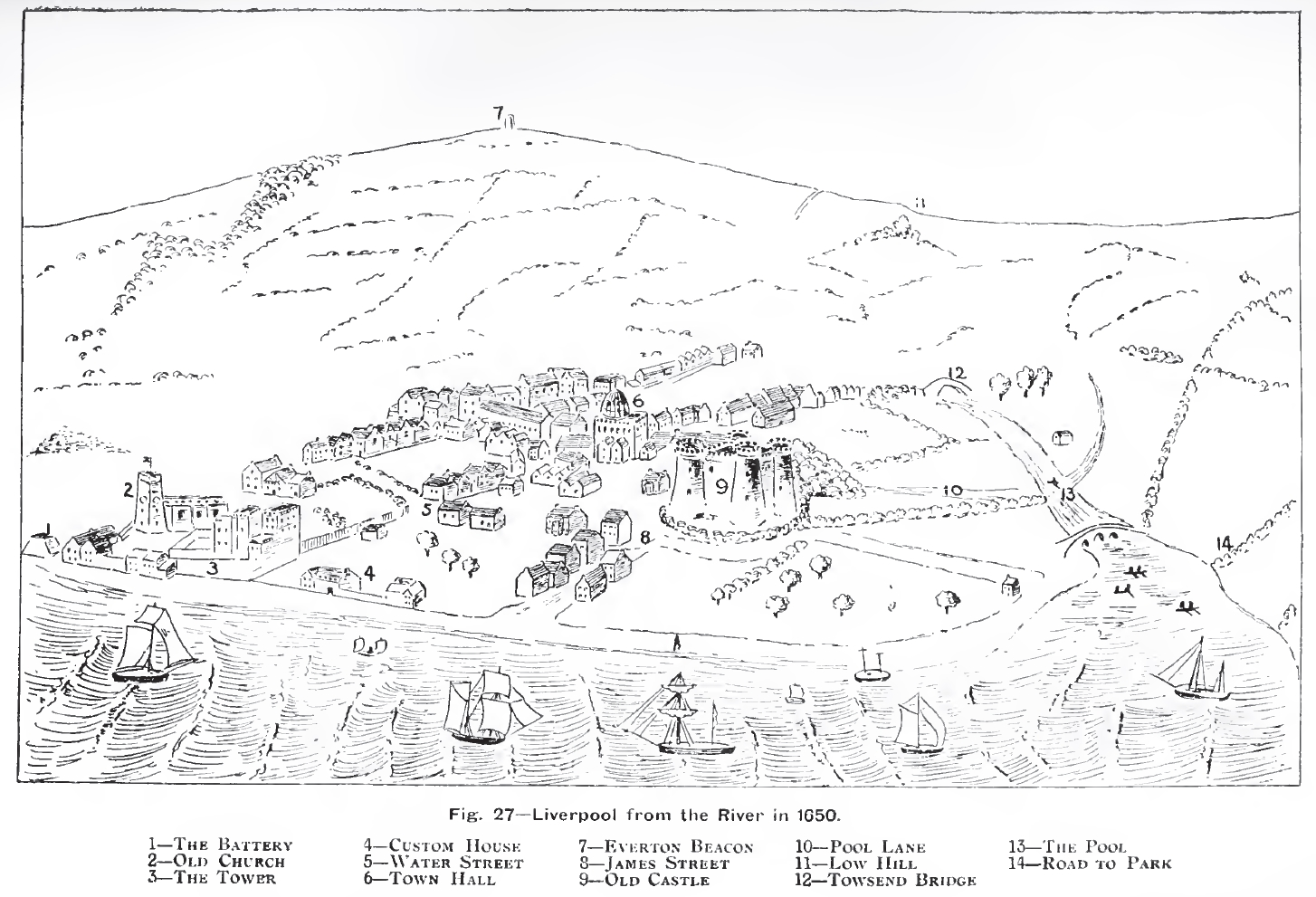
Liverpool in 1650

The development of the port began in the mid 17th century, with trade being established with the American colonies and the British West Indies, the first recorded cargo from America being tobacco that arrived in 1648. In 1672 The Corporation of Liverpool took a thousand-year lease of the lordship from Caryll Molyneux, 3rd Viscount Molyneux in order to obtain control of the land to the east of the medieval core. Liverpool's first Custom house was built in 1680 at the bottom of Water Street. Imports of tobacco went from virtually nothing in 1665 to 1.75 million pounds weight by the end of the 17th century, and over the same period sugar imports went from 700cwt to 11,600cwt and salt from 6,000 bushels to 300,000 bushels. In 1698 Celia Fiennes described Liverpool as having twenty-four streets, with "mostly new built houses of brick and stone after the London fashion.....built high and even". In this period the first recorded slave ship sailed from Liverpool. Named the Liverpool Merchant, it sailed on 3 October 1699 and arrived in Barbados on 18 September 1700 with a cargo of 220 enslaved Africans. Liverpool's strategic location on the estuary of the River Mersey and in 1710 the start of construction of the world's first commercial wet dock known as Old Dock, designed by Thomas Steers Dock Engineer (1710–50) and opened in 1715, saw the beginning of Liverpool's rise as a major port city.

In the aftermath of the English Civil War Liverpool Castle was partially dismantled and left a ruin; it was finally demolished in the 1720s. Liverpool's second town hall of 1673 was raised on stone pillars that formed an arcade that acted as the exchange. Several buildings from the Stuart era remain in Liverpool today, with one of the oldest of them, Tuebrook House a former farmhouse, dating from 1615. The Ancient Chapel of Toxteth also dates from this period and was likely started around 1618. The building is today grade I listed and still serves its original purpose as a Unitarian Chapel. In 1702 the south front of Croxteth Hall was created as the main facade of the building. The architect is not known for certain though master mason Henry Sephton has been suggested. The Unitarian Chapel in Gateacre was built in 1700, and altered 1719.

One of the period's most notable remaining buildings is Woolton Hall, a grade I listed manor house located in the south of the city. Also built for the Molyneux family, the hall is conceived as a Palladian villa and constructed from red sandstone from the local quarry in Woolton. The main facade is a remodelling of c.1774–80 by Robert Adam.

Mainly built in 1716–17, but with additions nearly immediately necessary, Bluecoat Chambers is the oldest surviving building in Liverpool city centre. Designed in the Queen Anne style, following in the tradition of Christopher Wren, it housed the Liverpool Blue Coat School. After the school moved to new premises in 1906, Bluecoat Chamber faced the possibility of being demolished several times. Following war damage in 1941, the reconstructed building was grade I listed in 1952.

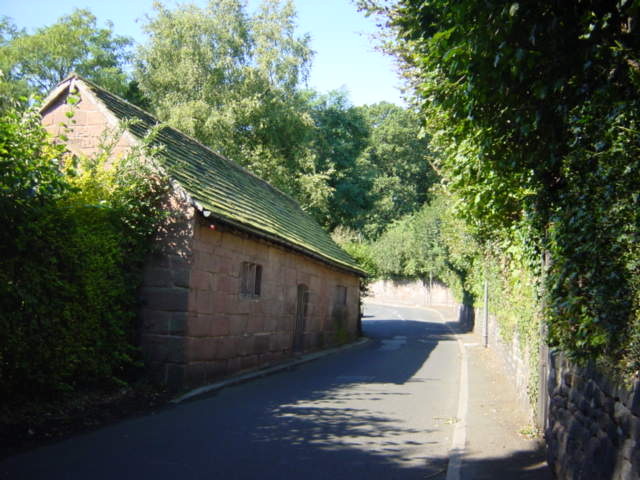
Much Woolton Old School, School Lane, Woolton
(c.1610; Grade II*)

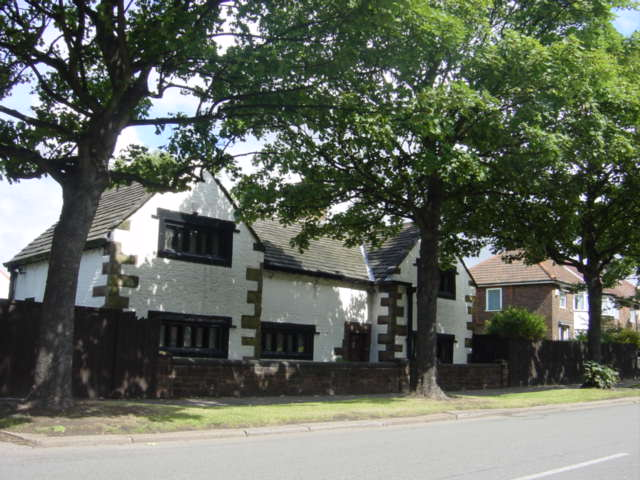
Tue Brook House, West Derby Road, West Derby
(1615; Grade II*)

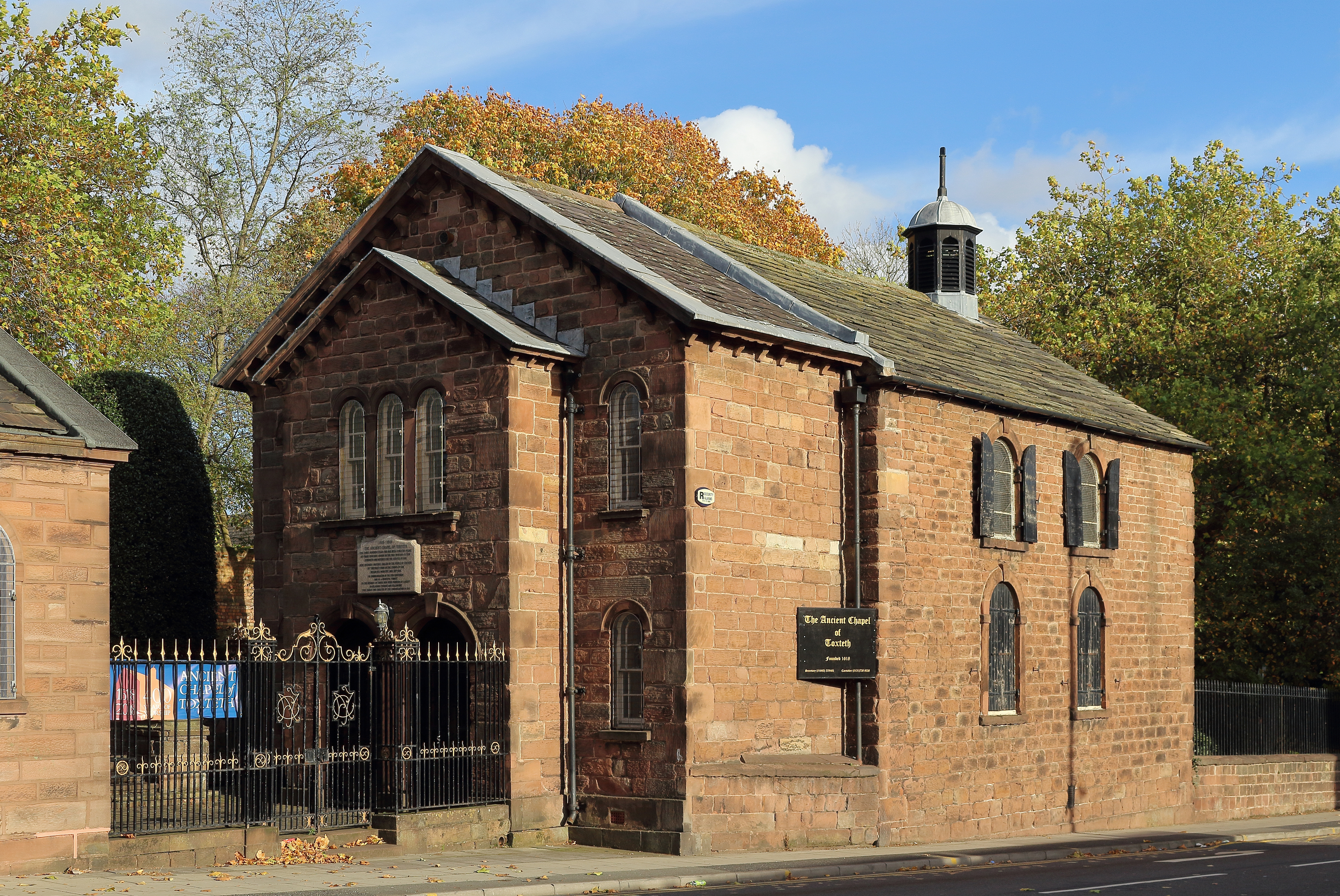
Toxteth Unitarian Chapel, Park Road, Toxteth
(1618; Grade I)

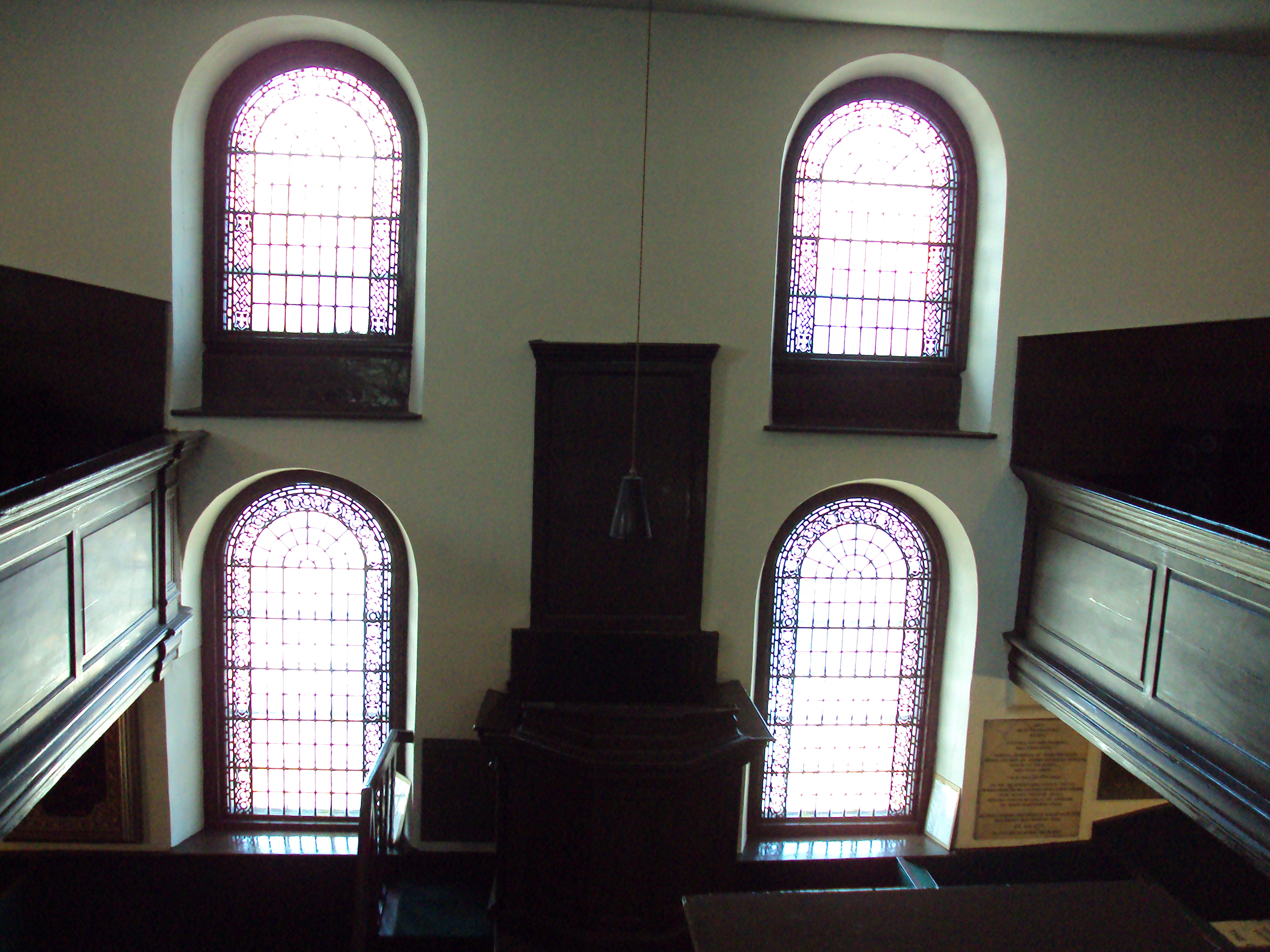
Interior, Toxteth Unitarian Chapel
(1618 altered 1774; Grade I)

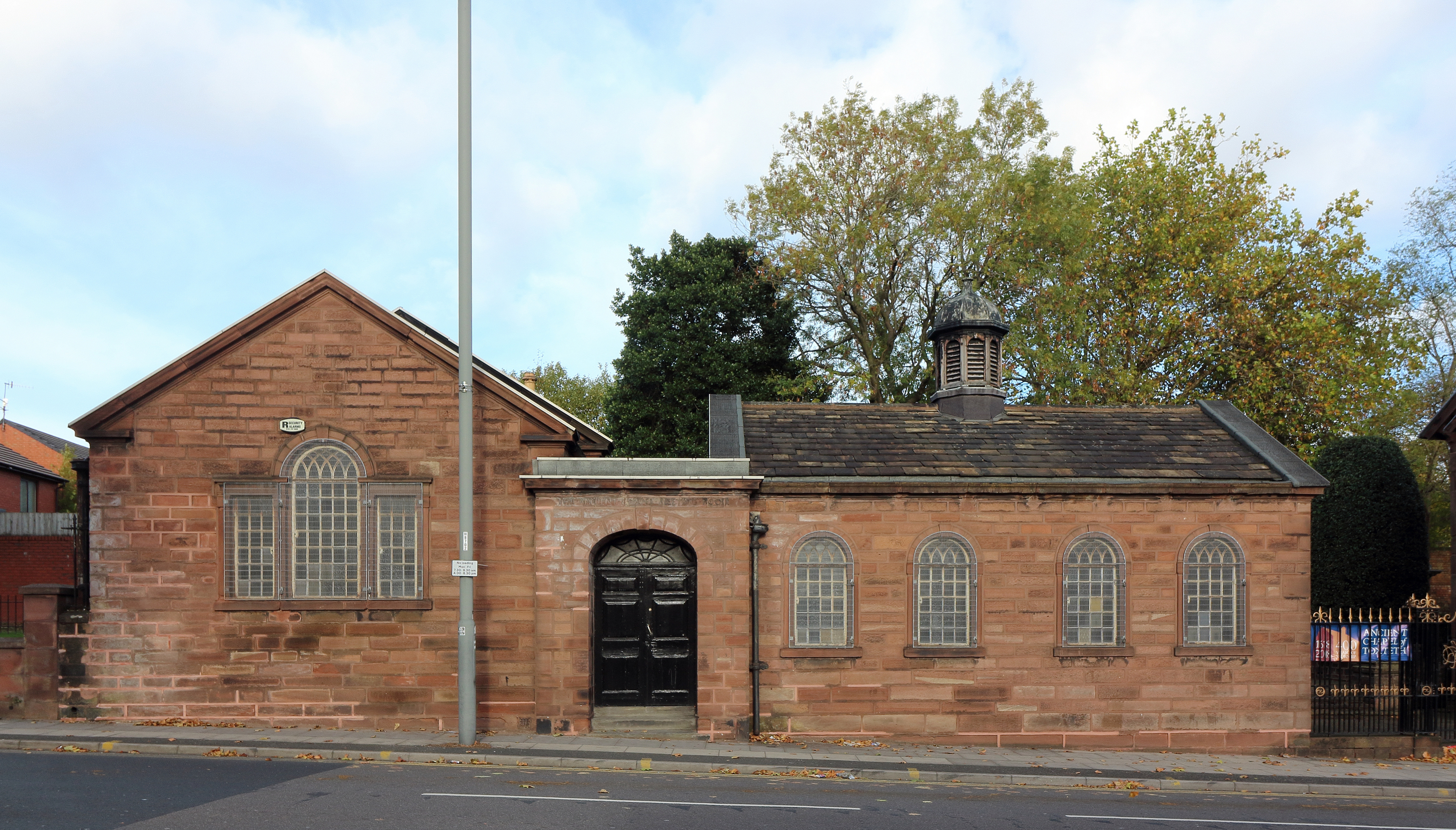
Schoolhouse next to Toxteth Unitarian Chapel, Park Road, Toxteth
(17th Century)

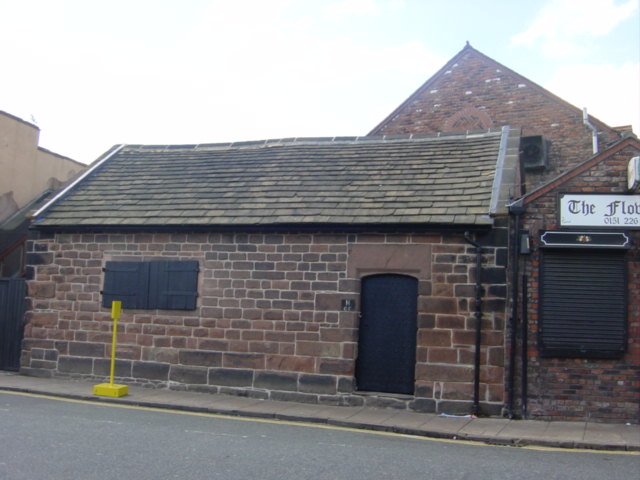
Old Wapentake Court, Almonds Green, West Derby
(1662; Grade II*)

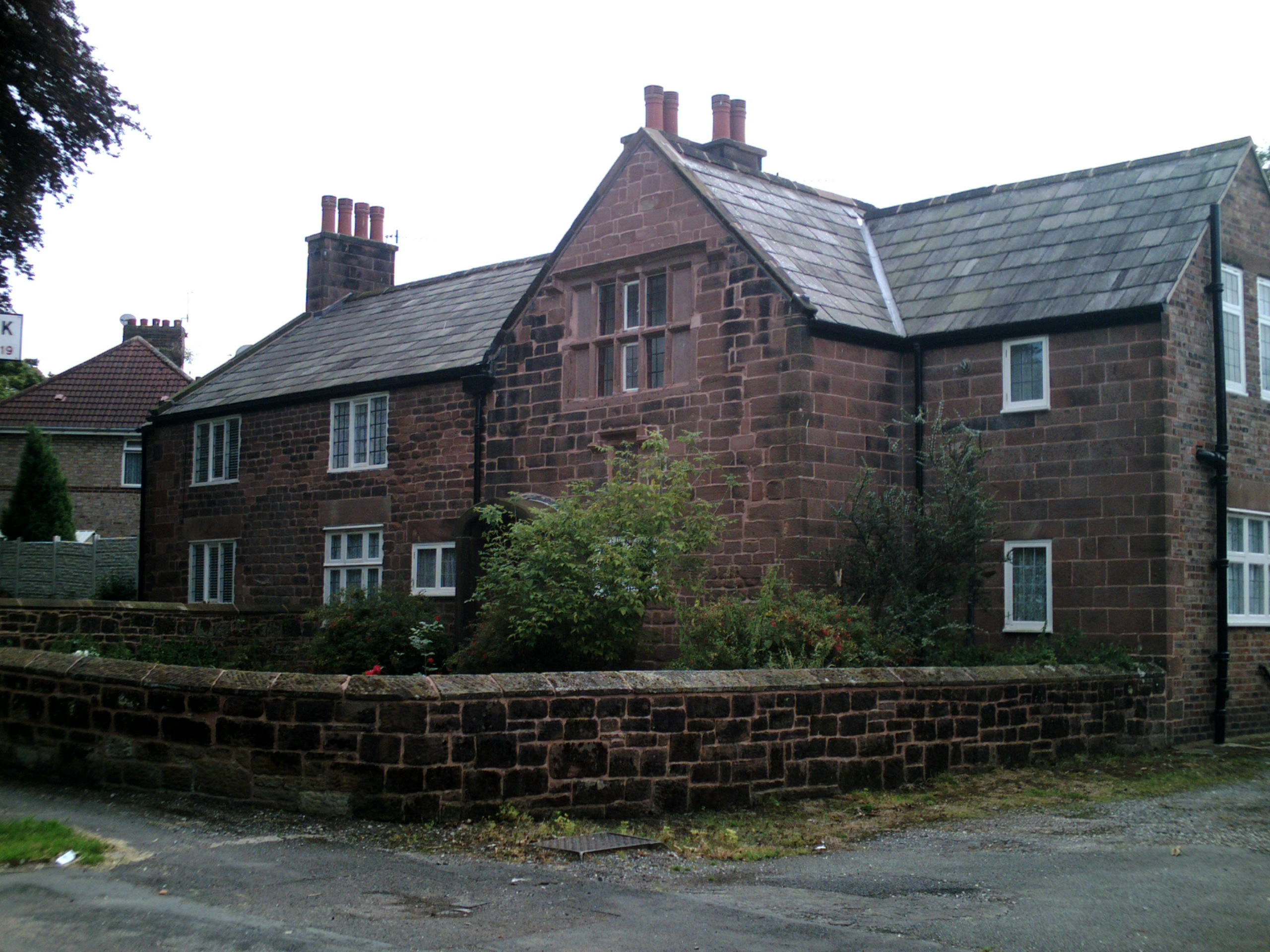
Springwood Cottages, Brocklebank Lane, Allerton
(1684; Grade II)

== Georgian (1714–1837) ==
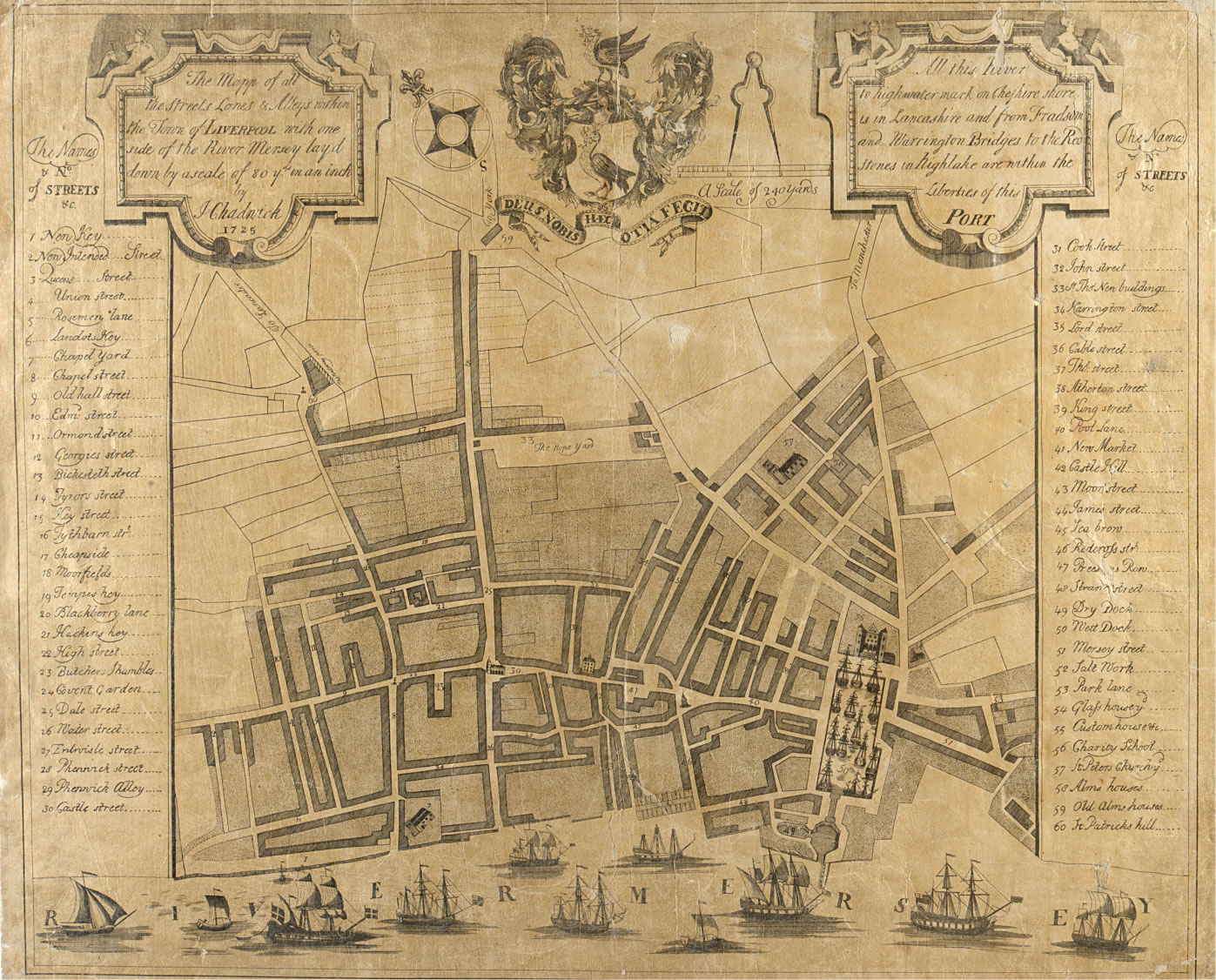
Map of Liverpool in 1725

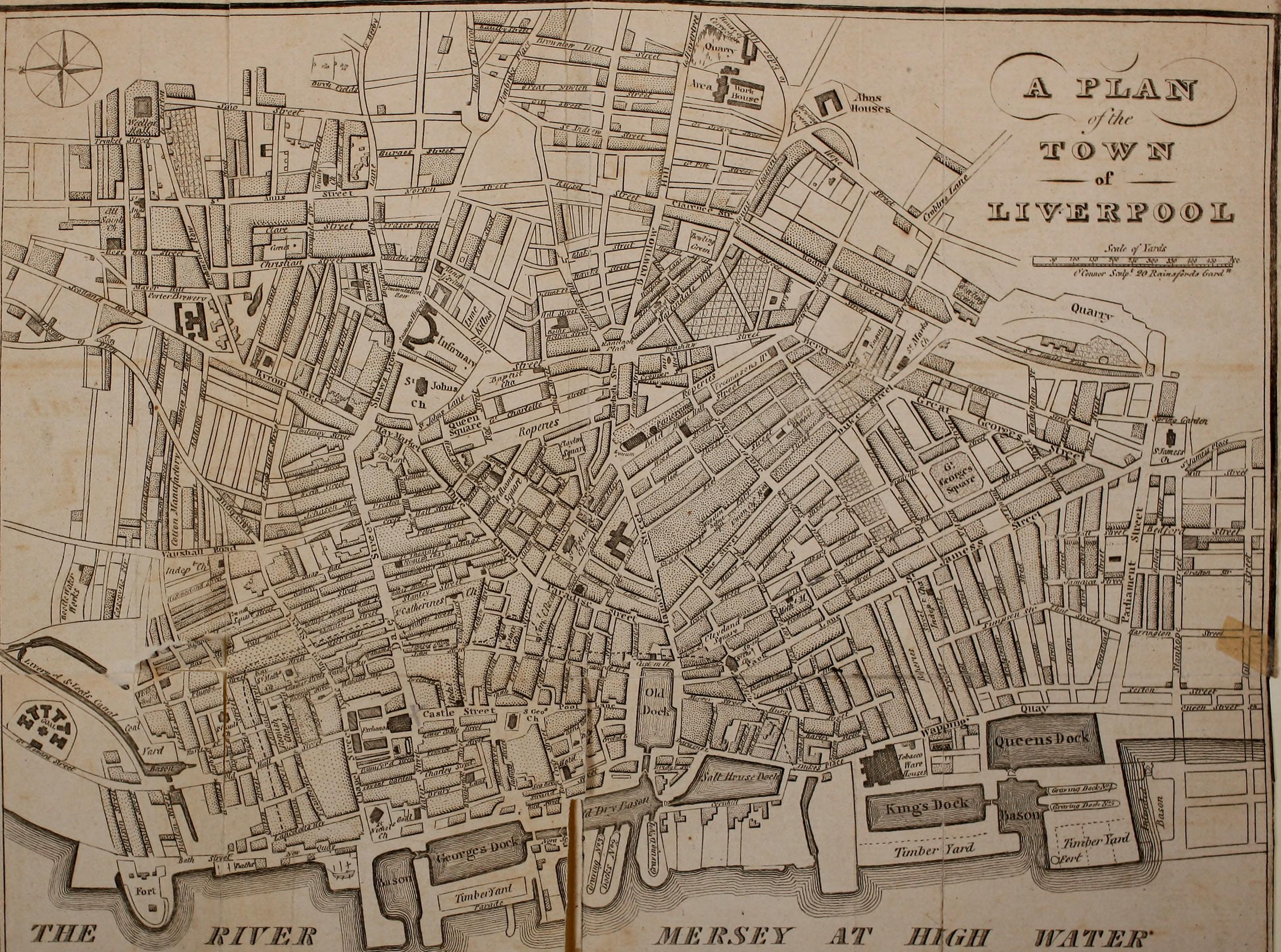
Map of Liverpool 1808

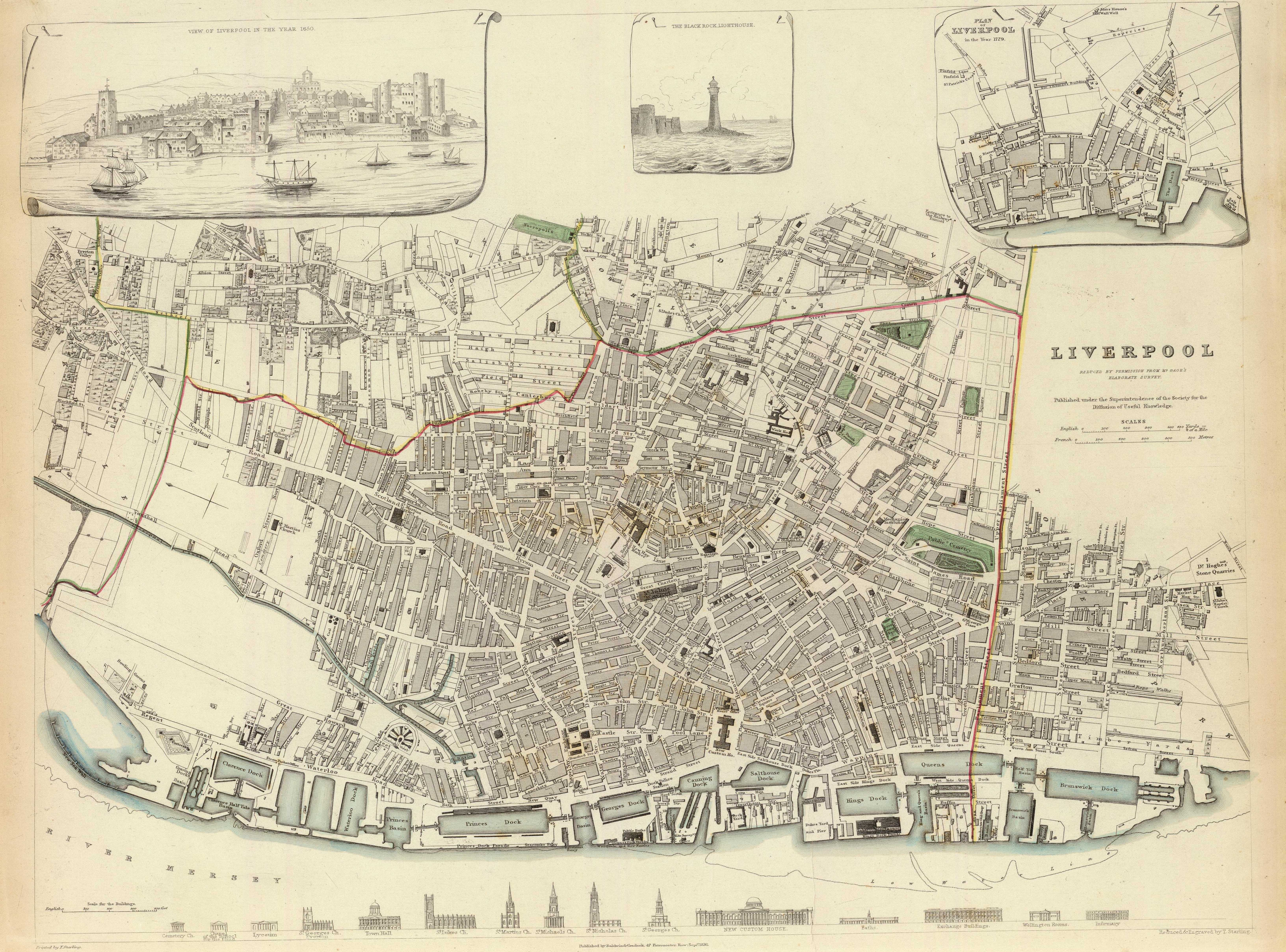
Map of Liverpool in 1836

The city expanded into an international seaport from the 17th century onward. The resulting transatlantic trade, particularly in slaves specifically the Triangular trade, was ended by the Slave Trade Act 1807. Liverpool's leading abolitionist was William Roscoe. Yet the predicted collapse in trade on the abolition of the slave trade failed to materialise, and dues from the docks rose from £28,365 in 1801 to £130,911 in 1824. The growth of the cotton industry in Lancashire had a major impact on the growth of Liverpool. In 1715 imports of tobacco were 2 million pounds (weight) and by 1750 6.1 million pounds, For sugar the figure are in 1715 30,000cwt and by 1750 100,000cwt. The growth in trade meant a new larger custom house was needed. This was designed by Thomas Ripley in 1717 and opened in 1722. The population of Liverpool rose from about 5,700 in 1700 to 165,000 by 1831. Revolutions in transport, including dock technology, first the growth of canals especially Mersey and Irwell Navigation (1721–34), Douglas Navigation (1720–42), Sankey Canal (1755–57) and the Leeds and Liverpool Canal built (1770–1816) surveyed by James Brindley, the Bridgewater Canal (1761–62) reached via the Leeds and Liverpool and then the railways starting with the Liverpool and Manchester Railway, chief engineer George Stephenson, built (1826–30), would contribute to the growth of the city. When Old Dock was completed in 1715 the tonnage of shipping into the port was 18,800. This grew to 29,100 in 1752 just before Salthouse Dock opened, and by the time George's Dock opened in 1771 it was 59,700. By 1800 the figure for shipping using the docks was around 400,000 tons. By 1825 1.2 million tons of goods were passing through the port. This ensured a continuing demand for new docks.

The docks created during the Georgian period were: under Thomas Steers Dock Engineer (1710–50): Canning Dock in 1737 as a dry dock open to the river. Built under Henry Berry during his tenure as Dock Engineer (1750–89), some were designed by other engineers: Salthouse Dock opened 1753; George's Dock opened 1771; Duke's Dock opened 1773 probably designed by James Brindley; Manchester Dock designer unknown, opened 1785 as a tidal basin open to the river; King's Dock, opened 1785, this catered to the tobacco trade; Queen's Dock, opened 1785, used for the timber trade. Thomas Morris Dock Engineer (1789–99) during his tenure: Chester Basin opened 1795. John Foster Sr. Dock Engineer (1799–1824) consultation involved in 1800 William Jessop and 1809 John Rennie the Elder, dock's built under him were: locks added to the Manchester Dock between 1810 and 1815 to make it a wet dock; Prince's Half-Tide Dock, opened 1810; Prince's Dock, opened 1821. Jesse Hartley dock engineer (1824–60) designed the following docks: Clarence Dock, opened 1830 specifically for the use of steamers; Canning Dock, originally opened 1737 as a dry dock and only became a full wet dock opened 1832 (at the same time Old Dock was filled-in in 1826 and the third custom house built on the site (1828–39) to the design of John Foster Jr. it was bombed in 1941 and the ruins demolished in 1946); Brunswick Half Tide Dock, opened 1832; Brunswick Dock opened 1832 used for the timber trade; Waterloo Dock, opened 1834; Victoria Dock, opened 1836; Trafalgar Dock, opened 1836. The dominant force in Liverpool Architecture from the late 18th century to the 1830s was John Foster Sr. and John Foster Jr. many of their buildings have been demolished, see Demolished Georgian Buildings below for details.

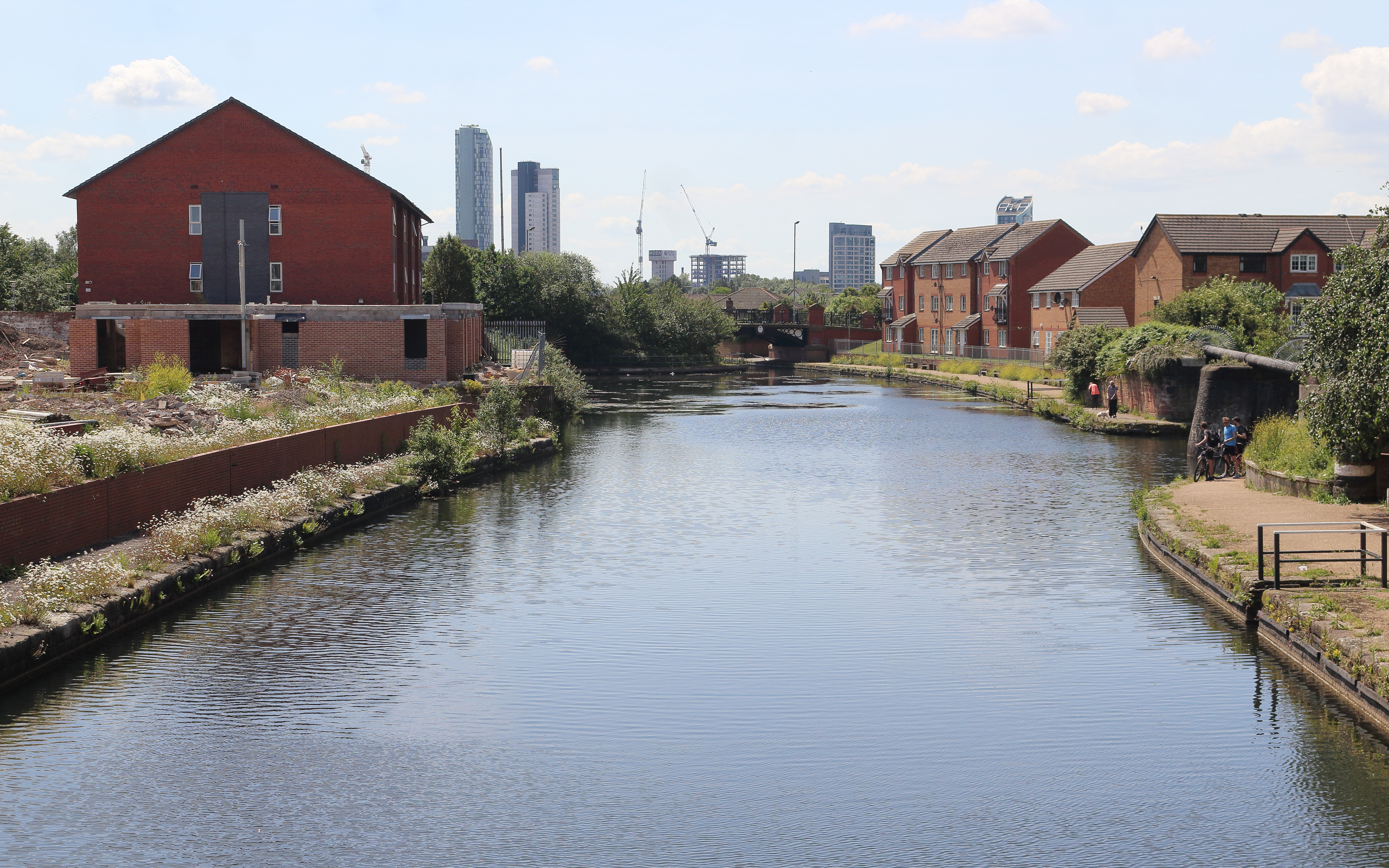
Leeds and Liverpool Canal, looking south from Barmouth Way Bridge, Vauxhall
(1770–74)

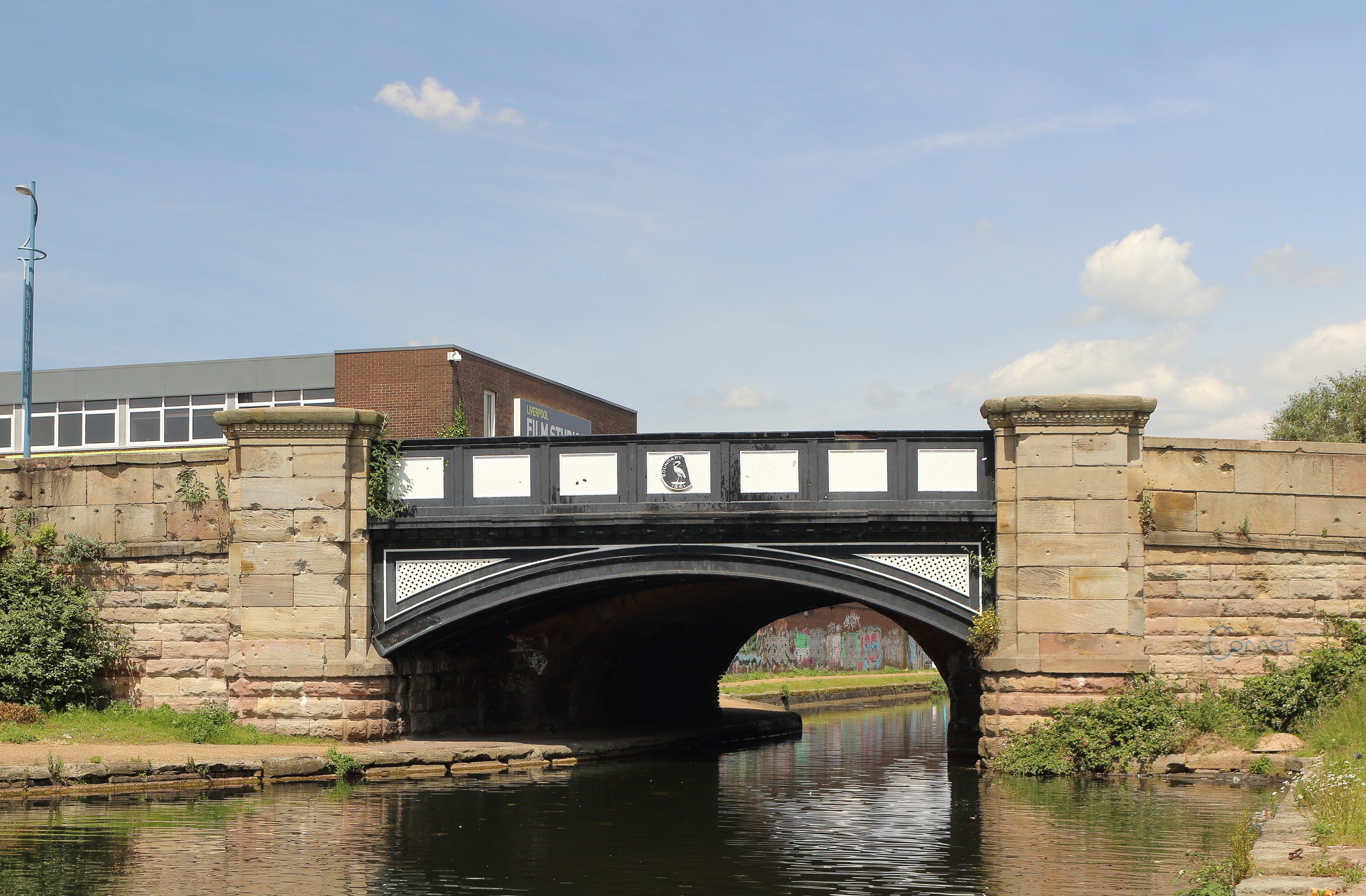
Boundary Bridge over Leeds and Liverpool Canal, Boundary Lane, Vauxhall
(1835 widened 1861; Grade II)

=== Georgian domestic buildings ===
Over time, the growing wealth of the city manifested itself in a number of elegant townhouses, many of which are still preserved today. The main concentration of Georgian houses in the city is the Canning and adjacent areas, near the Anglican cathedral. Percy Street & Huskisson Street being two of the main streets. But Rodney Street, Duke Street, Mount Pleasant and Abercromby Square are nearby, and Great George Square is the other side of the cathedral to the west are largely lined with Georgian houses. The west side of Abercromby Square, the first built was designed by John Foster Sr. in 1819.

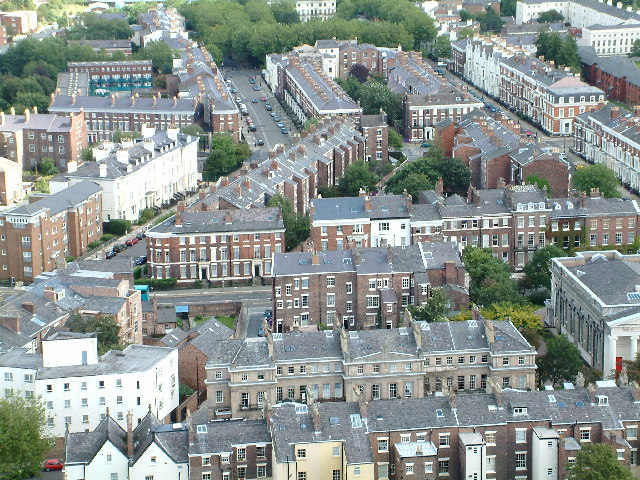
Georgian housing, from the Tower of the Anglican Cathedral

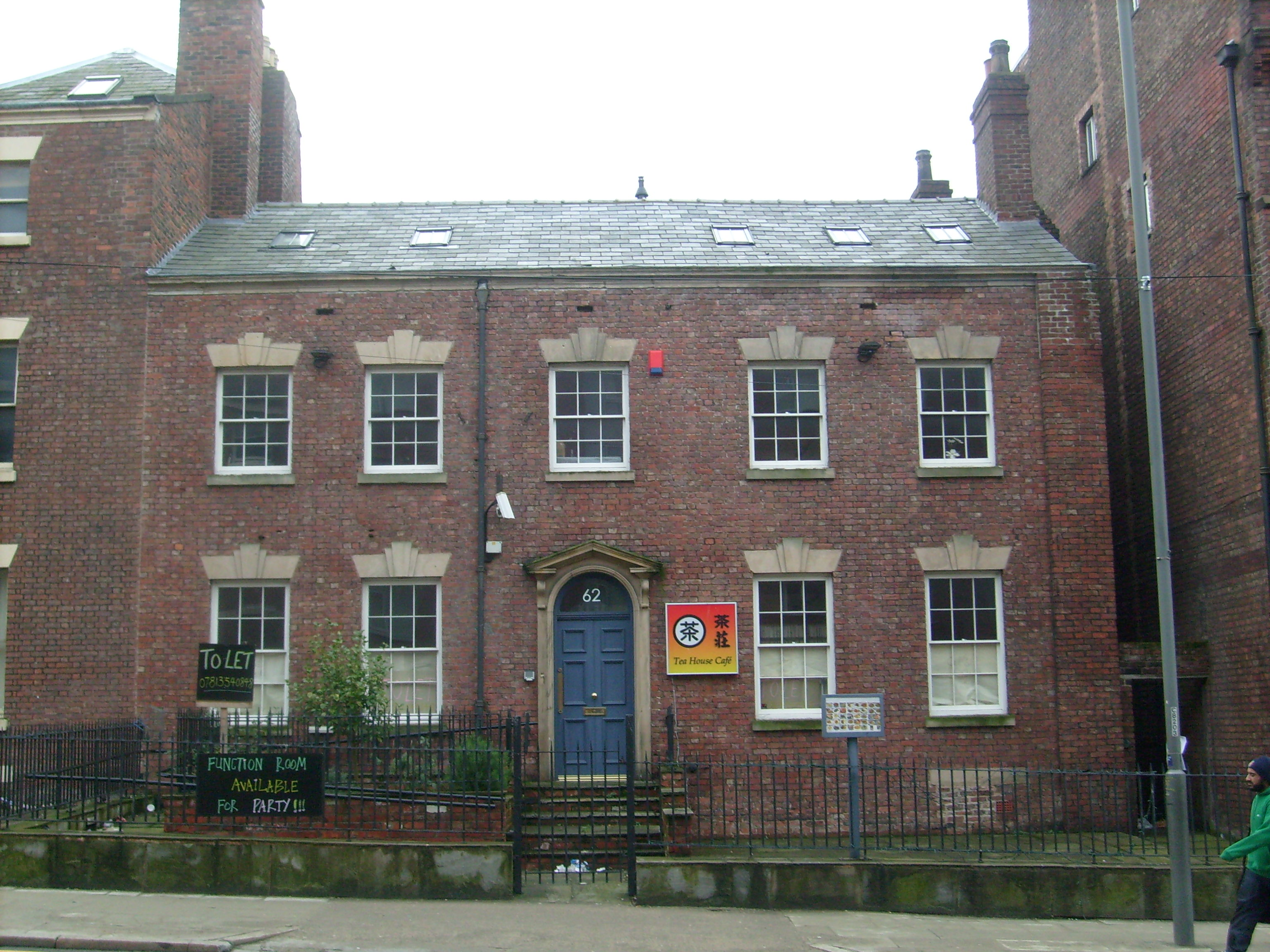
62 Mount Pleasant
(1767; Grade II)

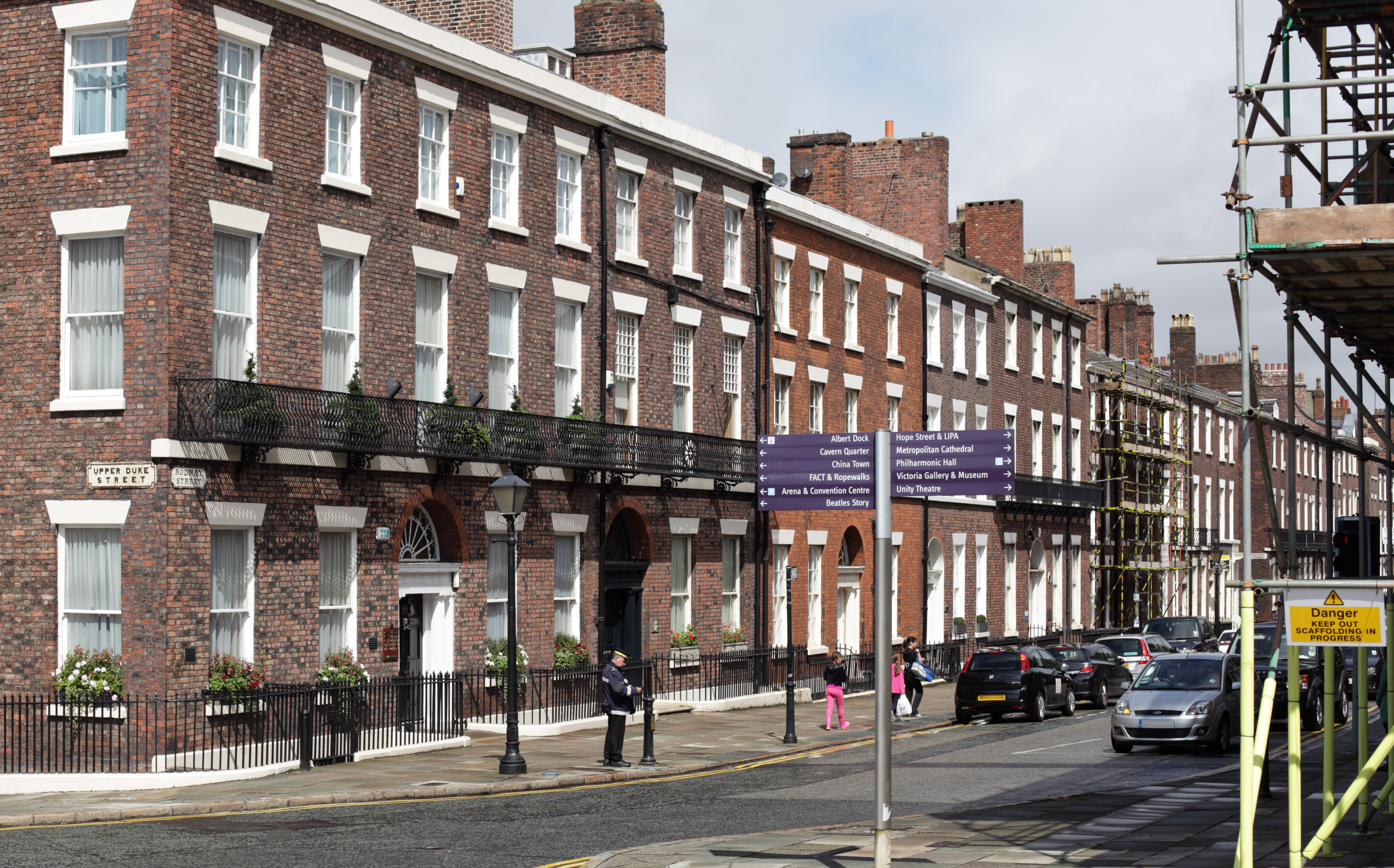
Georgian townhouses
Rodney Street

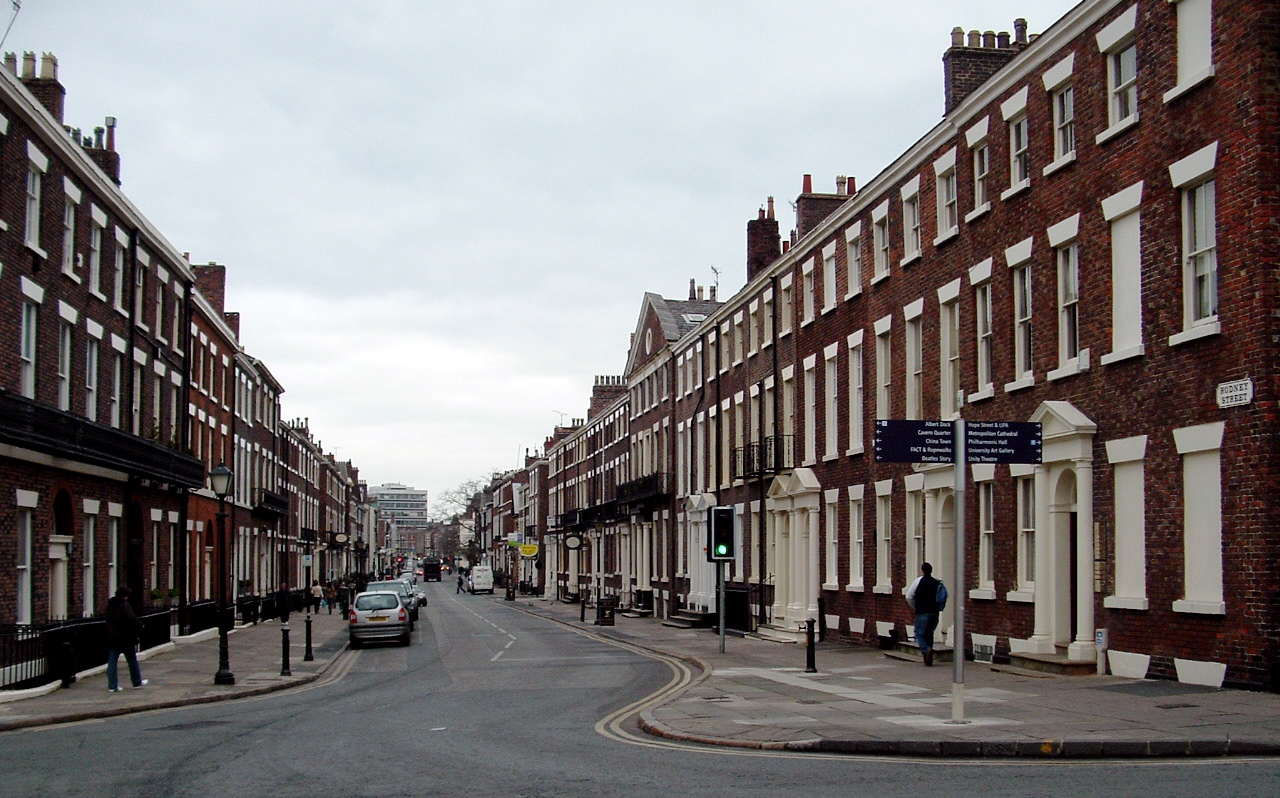
Rodney Street
(1784; Grade II)
Number 62, the birthplace of Gladstone, is Grade II*

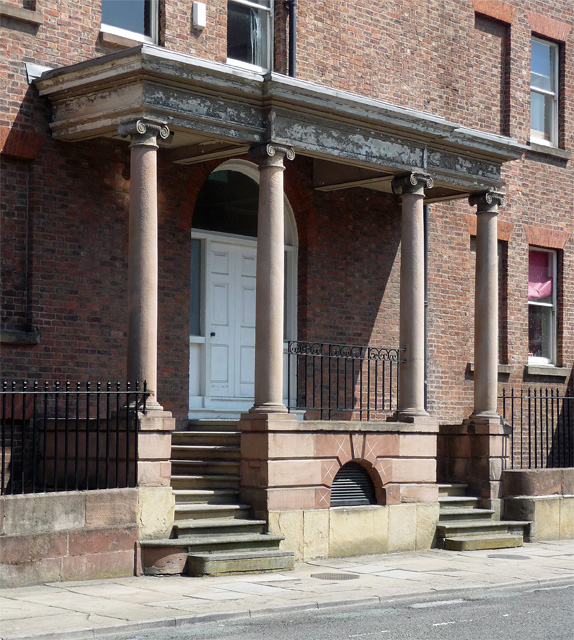
Former Liverpool Institute High School for Girls, Hope Street, (Built as a private home)
(1785–90; Grade II)

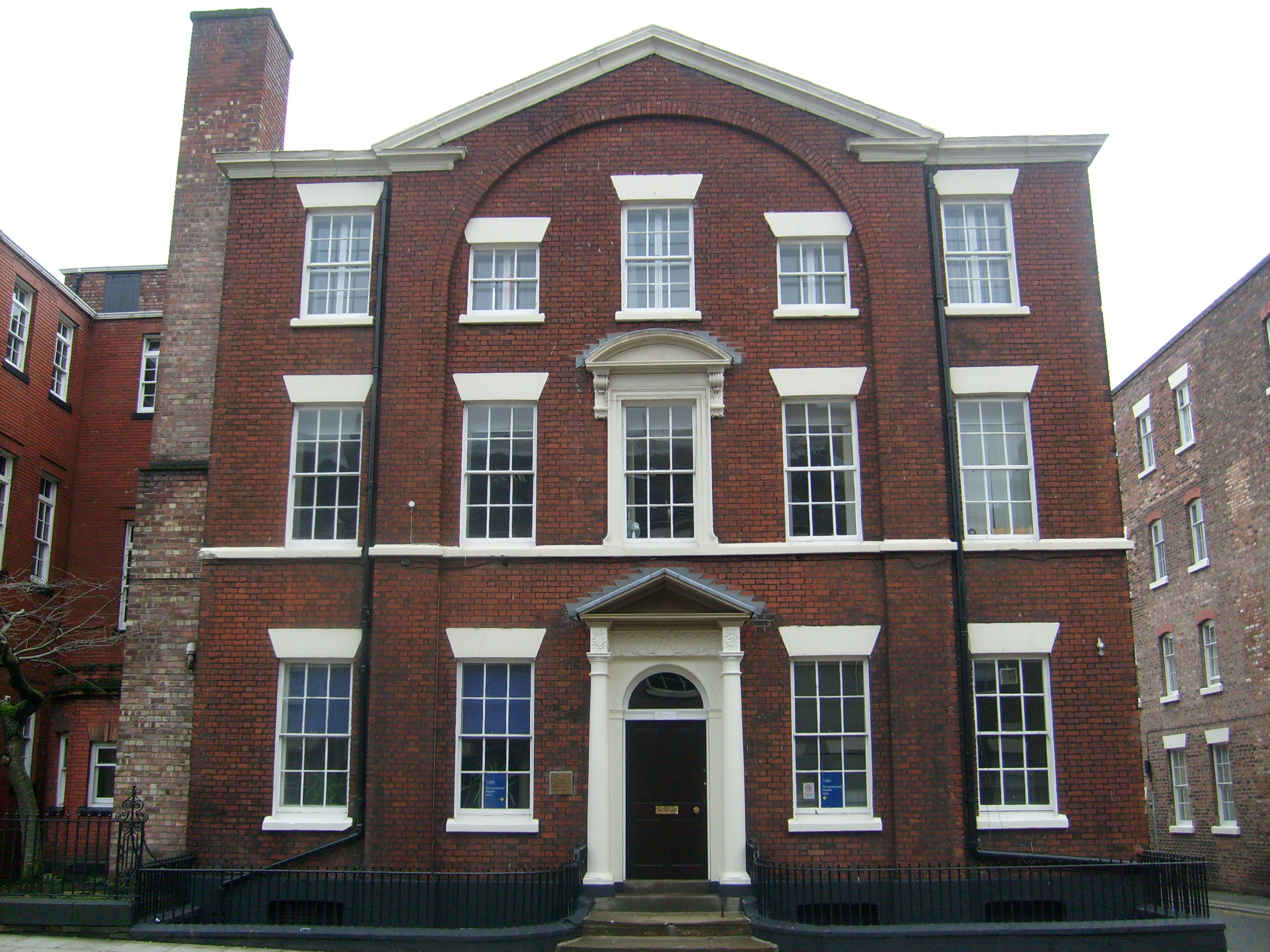
66 Mount Pleasant
(1788; Grade II)

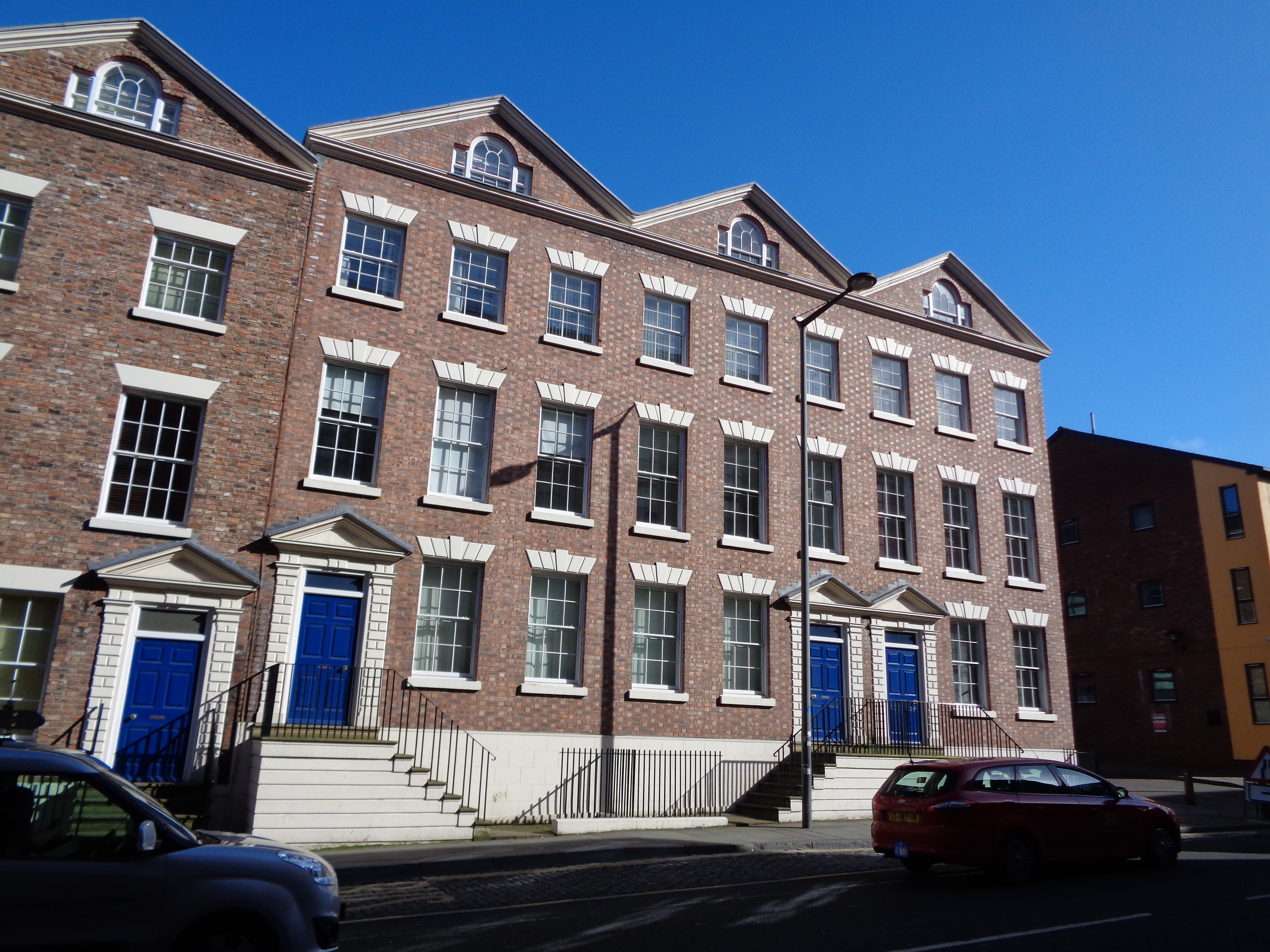
120, 122 and 124, Duke Street
(late 18th century; Grade II)

Georgian housing is found throughout the city, both Georgian terraces and individual house, Shaw street Everton and Hope Terrace Wavertree being examples. There are several Georgian houses around St Mary's church Edge Hill and around the centre of Woolton.

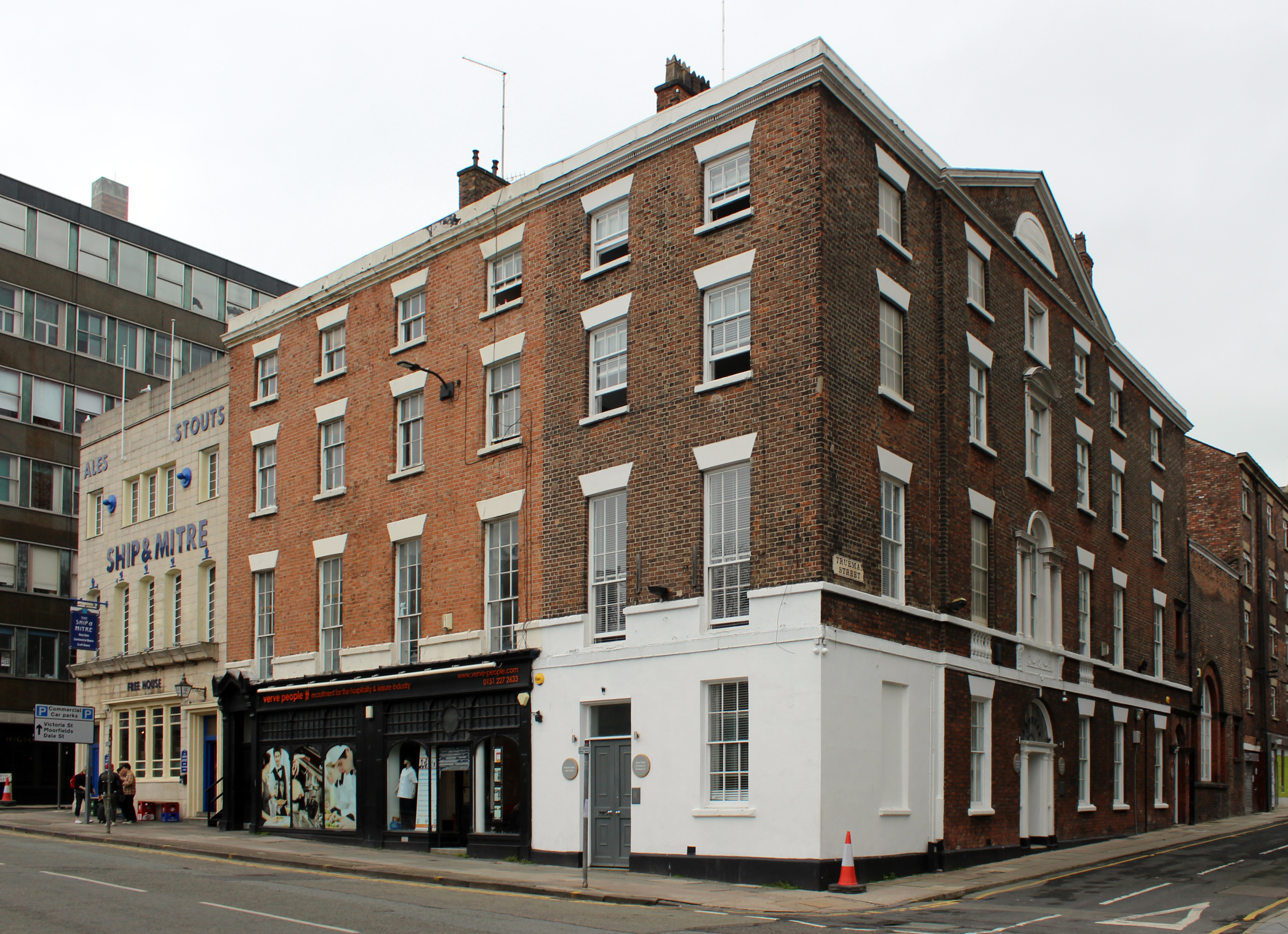
135-139 Dale Street
(c.1788; Grade II)

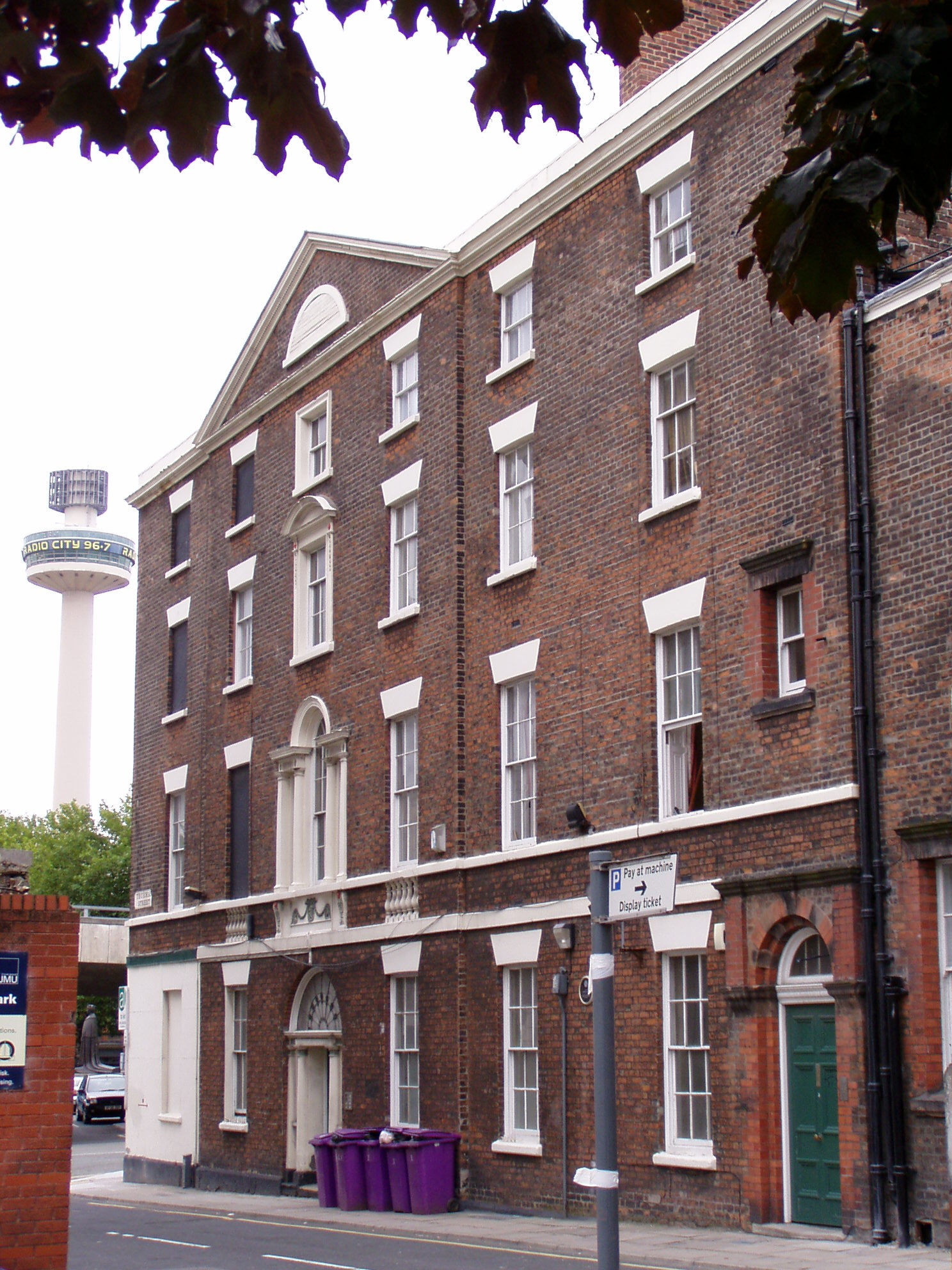
1 Trueman Street
(1788; Grade II)

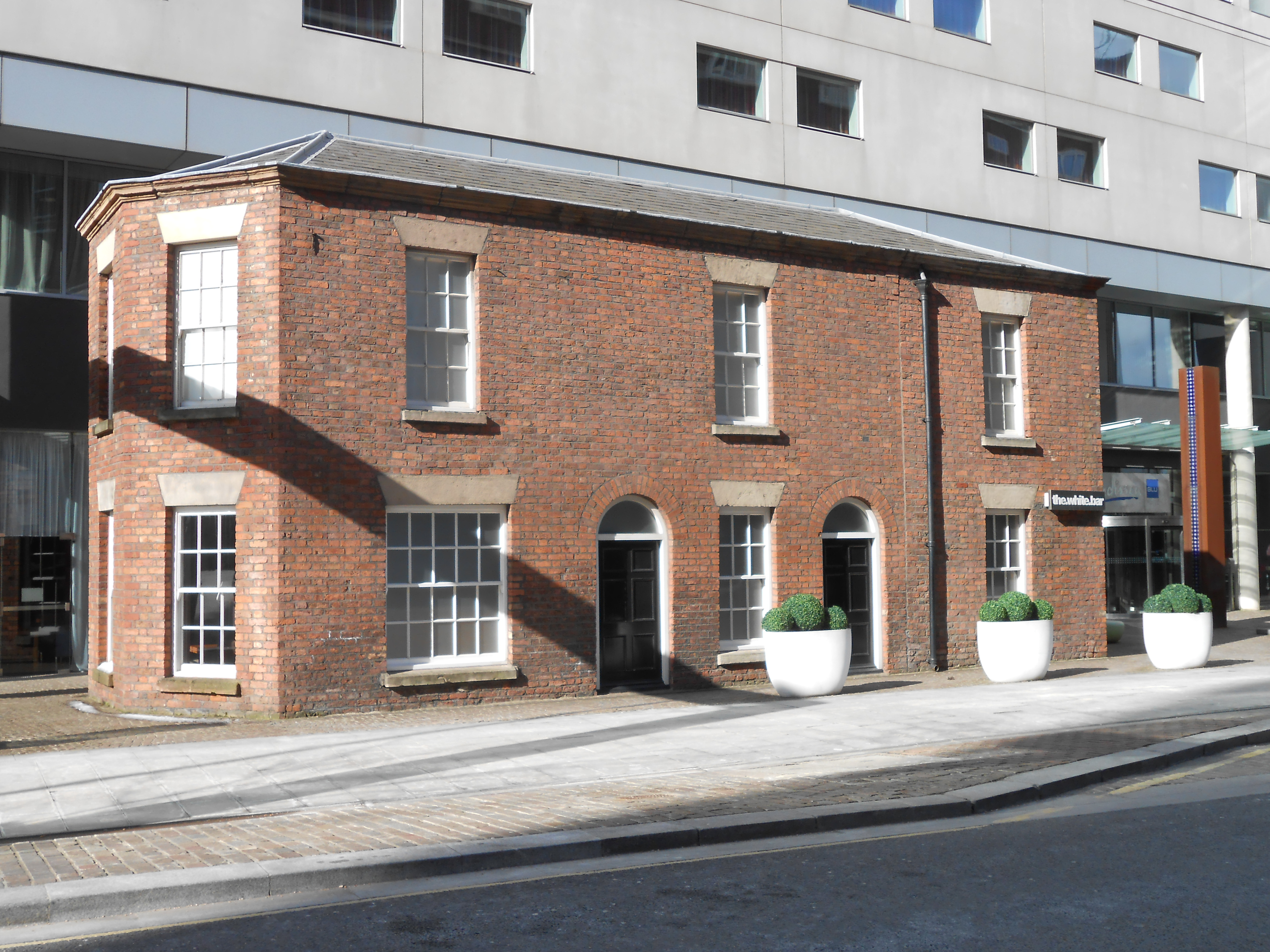
Clarke's Basin cottages, Old Hall Street
(1800; Grade II)

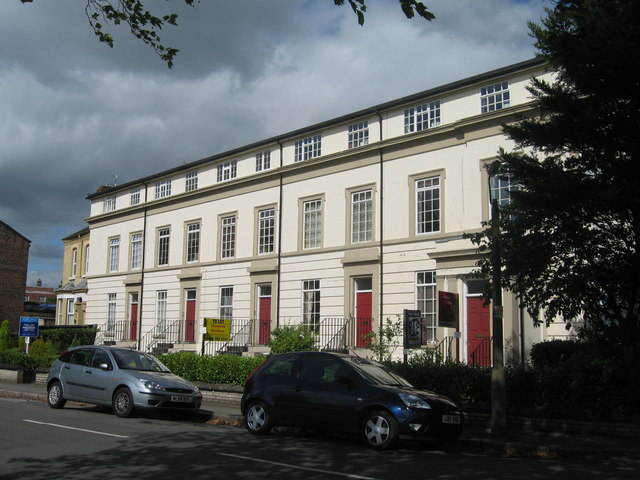
Hope Terrace, Prince Alfred Road, Wavertree
(1819; Grade II)

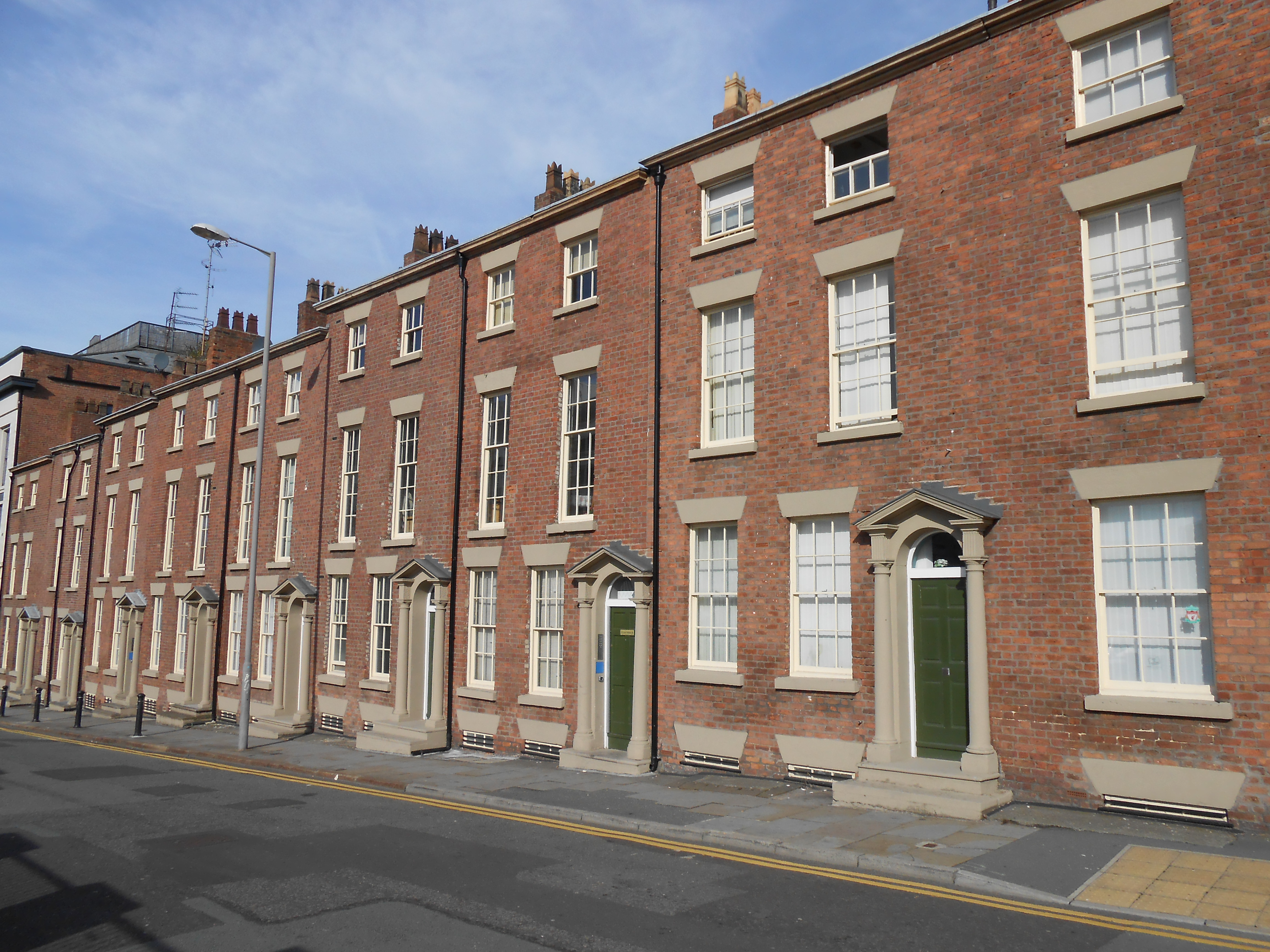
19-33 Lord Nelson Street
(c.1820; Grade II)

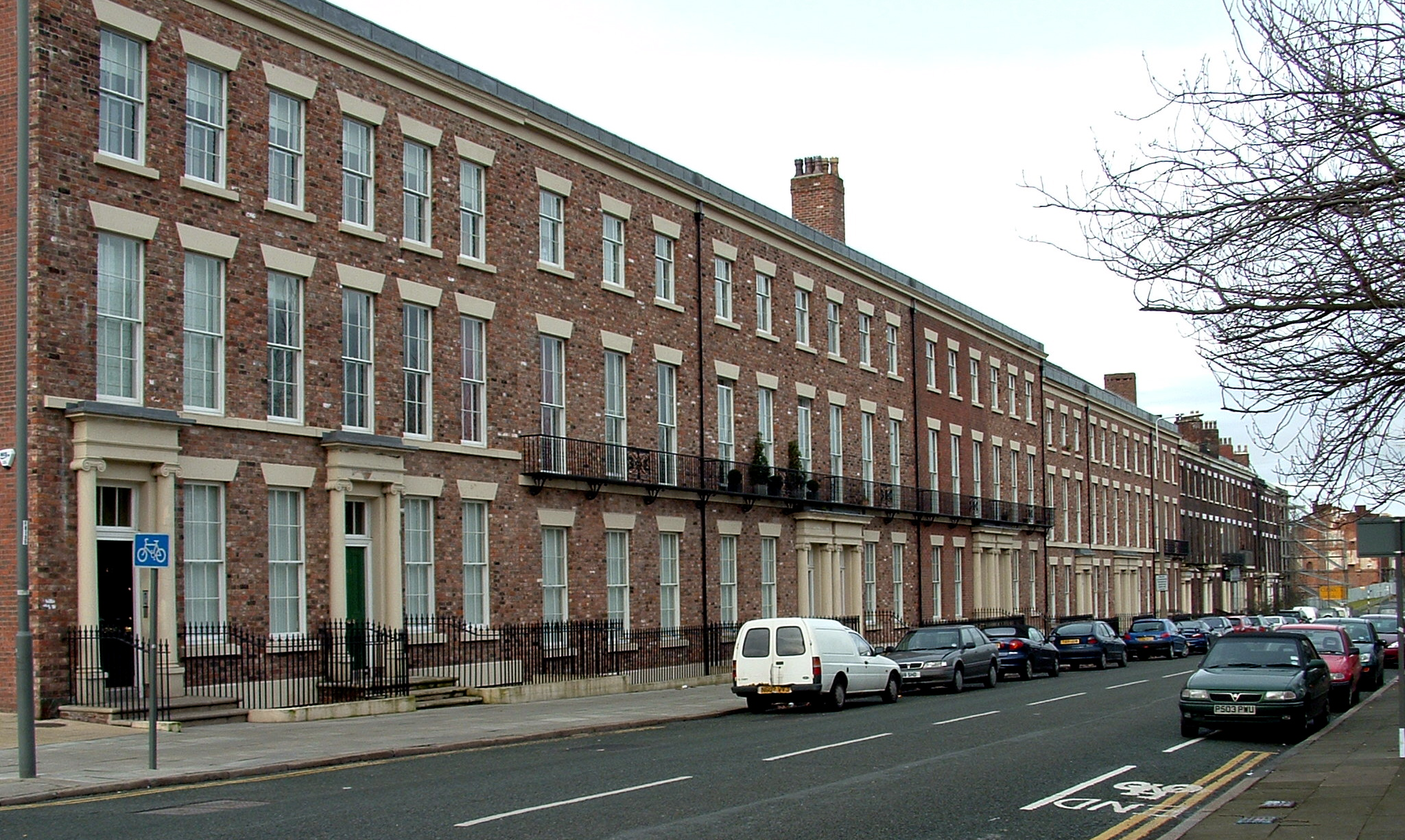
Shaw Street, Everton, several of the houses individually listed
(c.1826; Grade II)

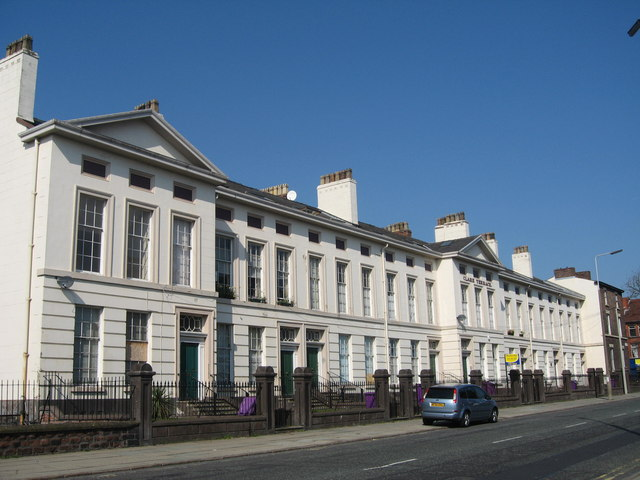
Clare Terrace, Marmaduke Street, Kensington
(c.1830; Grade II)

There are also larger detached Georgian mansions and villas, such as Allerton Hall built c.1736 for slave traders John Hardman and his brother James, is a rare example in Liverpool of Palladian architecture. A rare example of an 18th-century merchant's villa is May Place, Broad Green Road, Old Swan, know to be in existence by 1768. The former Rectory of St Mary's Walton (c.1800), built in a Gothic style, the porte-cochère was added in 1830. A fine detached late eighteenth-century house is Olive Mount, Wavertree, built for James Swan grocer and tea dealer. Sudley House built 1824 for corn merchant Nicholas Robinson and extended in the 1880s that is run as an Historic house museum, although the architect is not known for certain John Whiteside has been suggested as the designer. The burnt out ground floor of Allerton House (1815) by Thomas Harrison, for Jacob Fletcher whose father made a fortune privateering, survives on Allerton Golf Course, the Lodge also survives and is probably Harrison's work. A large mansion of 1828 is Calderstones House, built for Joseph Need Walker, a lead shot manufacturer. Bark Hill, Mossley Hill, is an 1830s villa with a Doric porch, close by is Holmefield, also 1830s with an Ionic Porch. Beaconsfield House, Beaconsfield (1830s) was built for solicitor Ambrose Lace, but only the Coachman's House and Stables survive as 84 Beaconsfield Road in a Jacobethan style. Childwall hall (1806) a castellated Gothic mansion by John Nash, built for Bamber Gascoyne and was demolished in 1949, but the gate lodge survives and maybe the work of Nash. Leyfield House, Honeys Green Lane, West Derby is a fine stuccoed villa with a Doric porch. Another fine stuccoed villa is Beechley, Harthill Road Allerton.

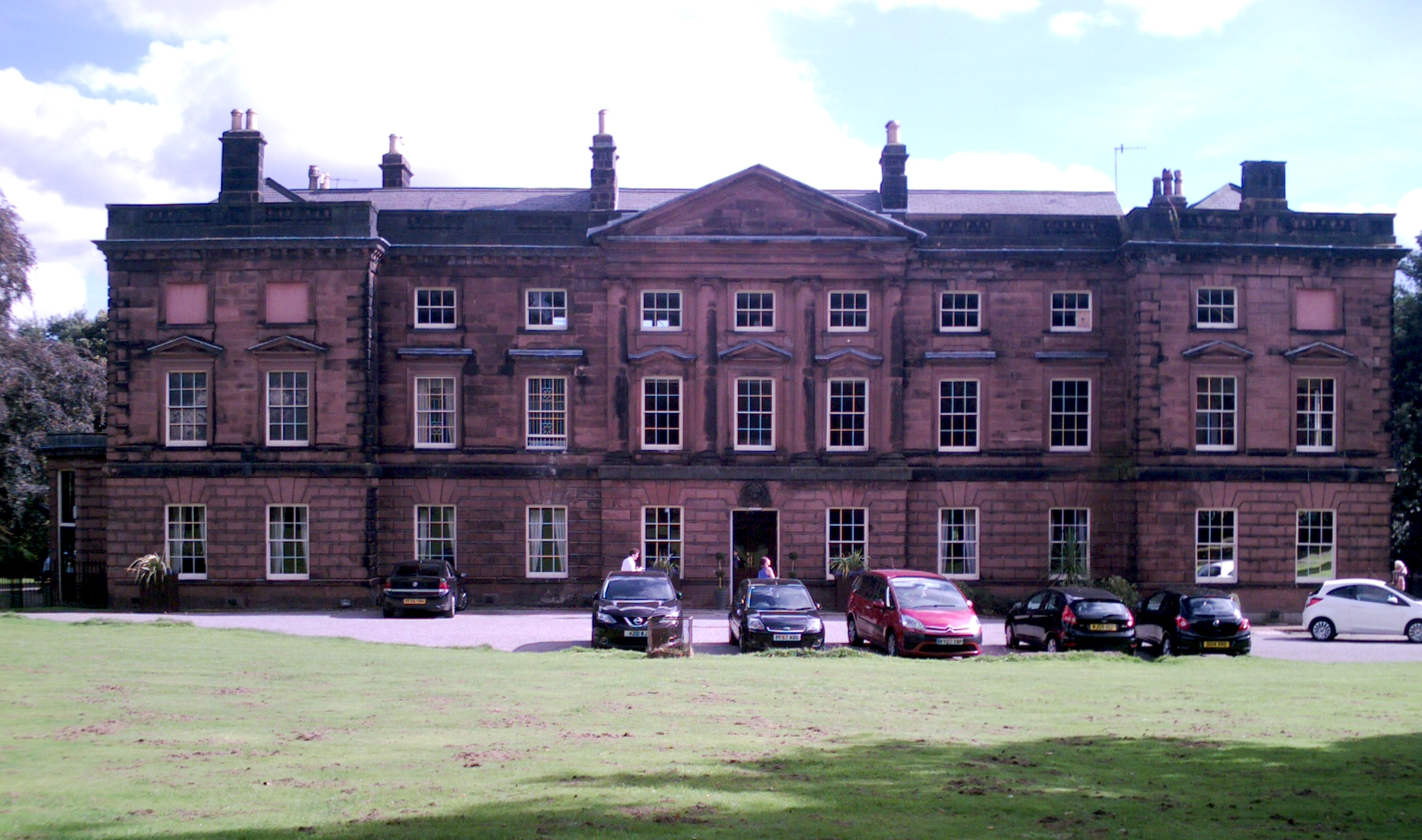
Allerton Hall, Clarke's Gardens, Woolton Road, Allerton
(c.1736; Grade II*)

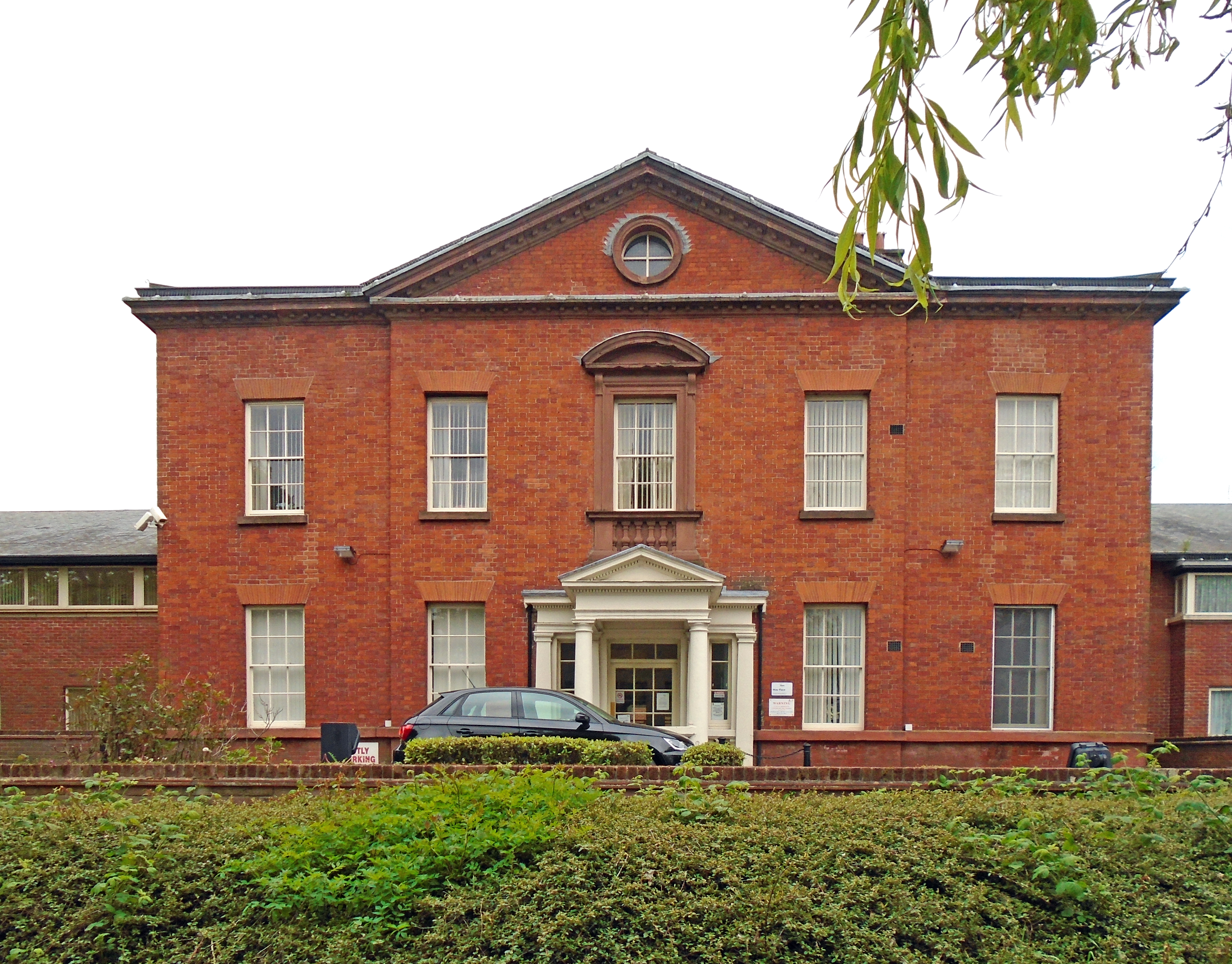
May Place, Broad Green Road, Old Swan, Tue Brook
(existing by 1768; Grade II)

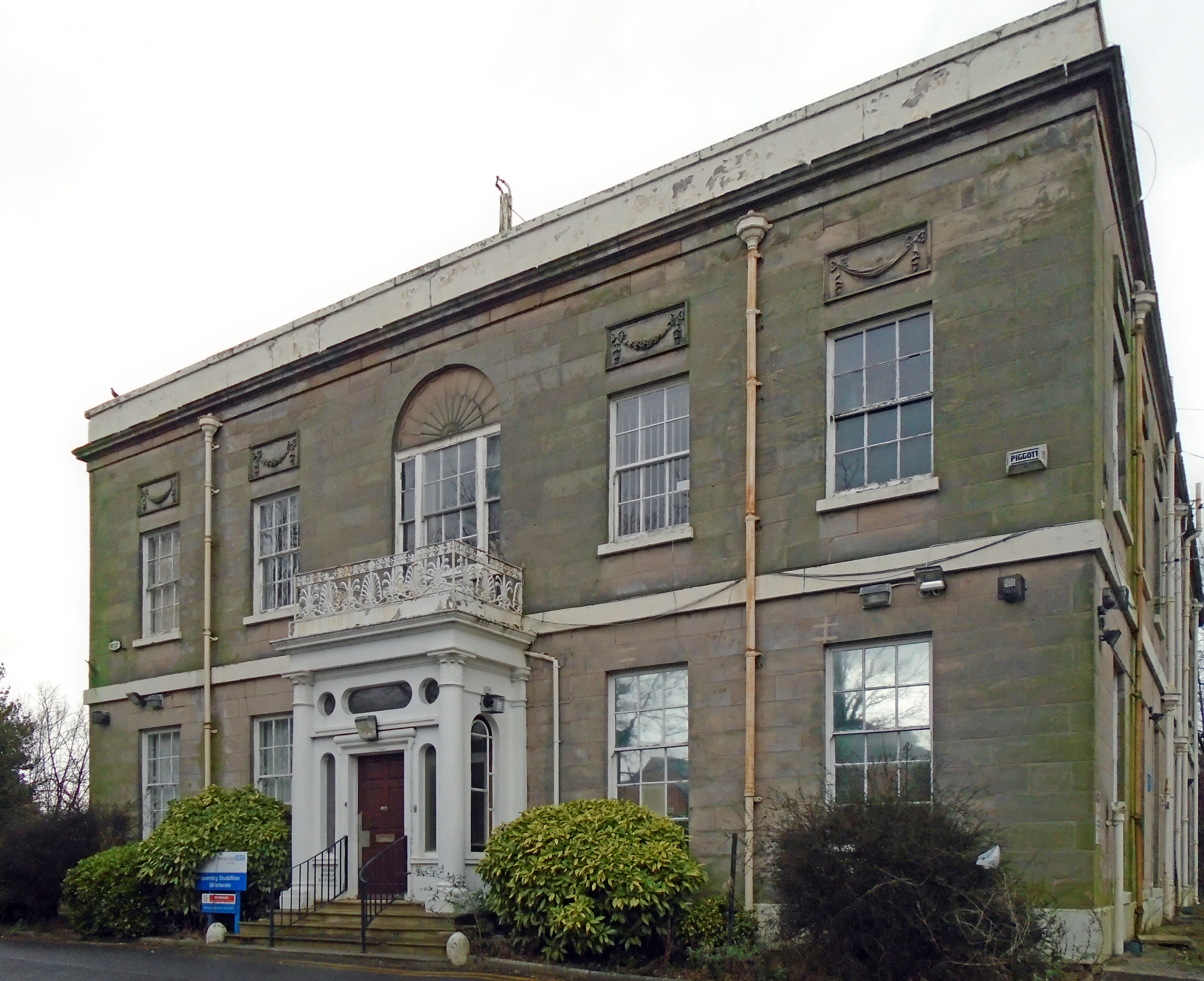
Olive Mount House, Mill Lane, Wavertree
(1790s; Grade II)

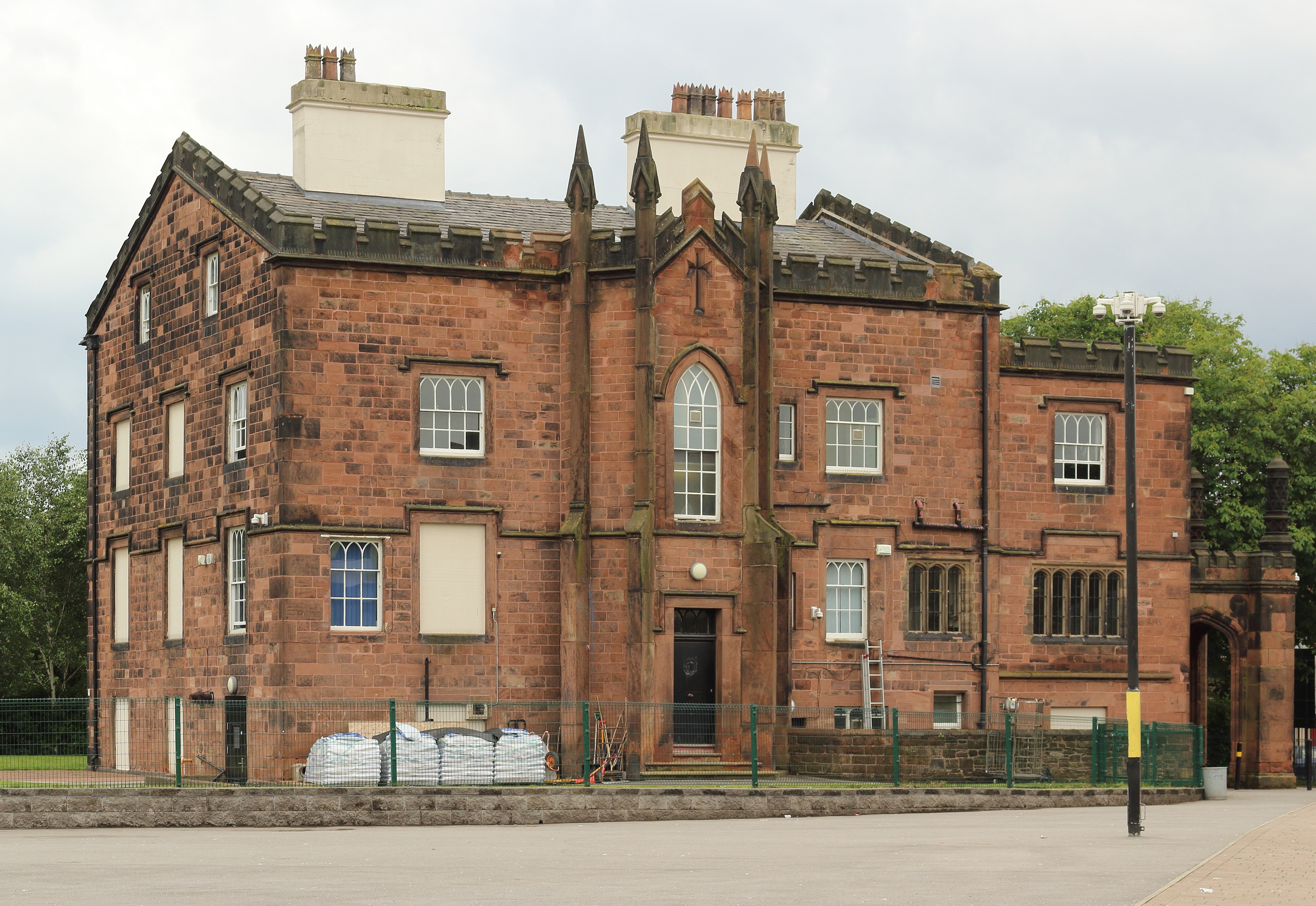
Old Rectory, St Mary's, Queen's Drive, Walton
(c.1800; Grade II)

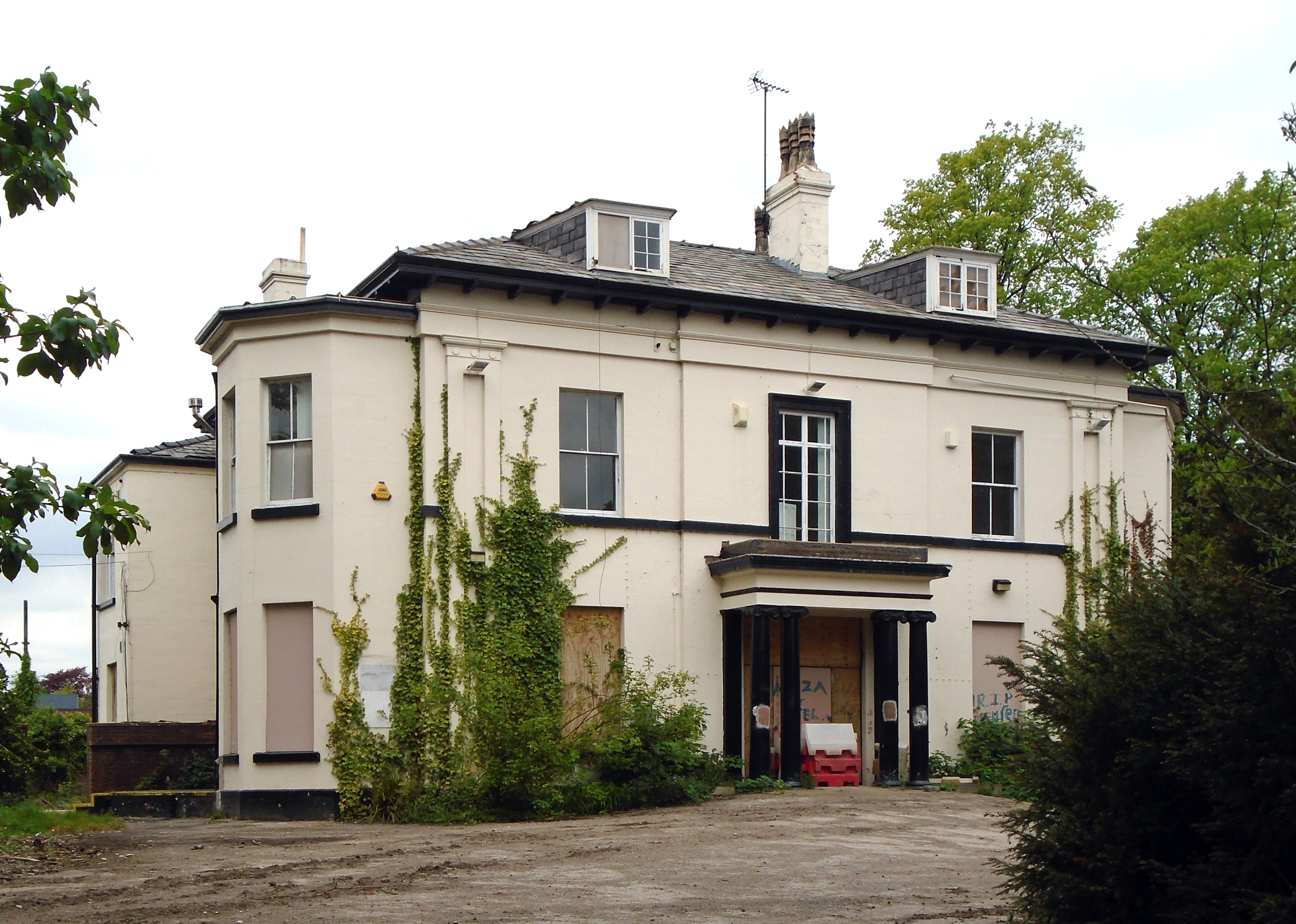
Sandheys, Mill Lane, West Derby
(early 19th century; Grade II)

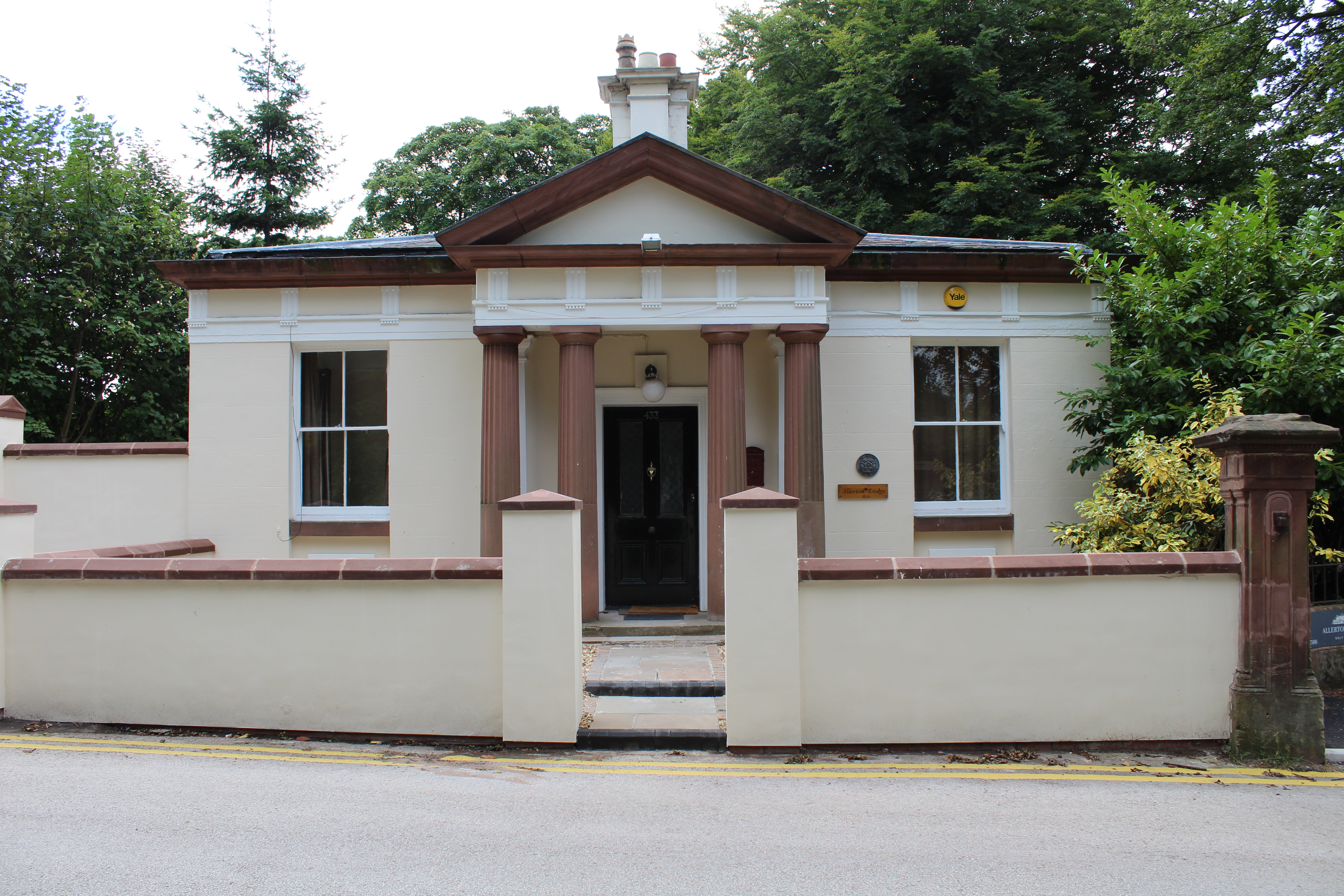
Lodge to Allerton or Obelisk House, Allerton Road, Allerton
(c.1815; Grade II)

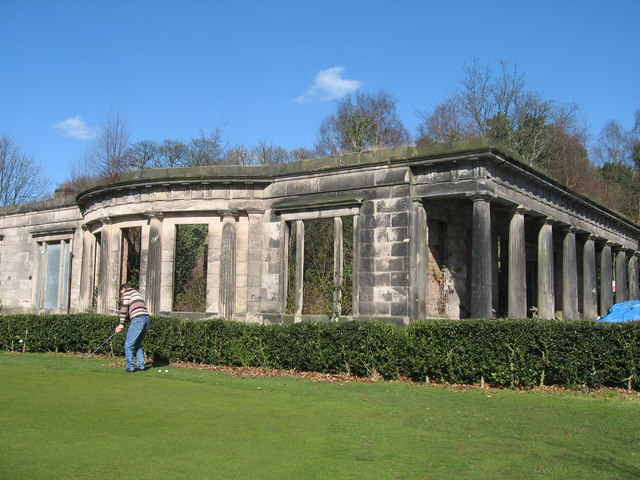
Ruins of Allerton or Obelisk House, Allerton Golf Club
(1815; (burnt 1944) Grade II)

=== Georgian public buildings and memorials ===
Liverpool Town Hall was built in the Palladian style between 1749 and 1754 to a design by John Wood the Elder replacing an earlier town hall nearby. It was significantly extended and altered by James Wyatt from 1785. Its sumptuous interiors also by Wyatt, are highly regarded examples of late Georgian architecture, in refined neoclassical style, the actual building work was overseen by John Foster Sr. who was the Surveyor to the Corporation of Liverpool from 1790 to 1824. The city's stock exchange and financial district are set immediately behind this building, showing the close ties between local government and commerce. Other public buildings in the city of this era are the Liverpool Royal Institution that was constructed in c.1799 as a house and business premises for a merchant called Thomas Parr and was adapted by Edmund Aikin in 1815, who added the Doric order porch and Edge Hill railway station is a rare pre-Victorian (1836) railway station, it was between 1830–1836 the original terminus of the Liverpool and Manchester Railway.

The Wapping Tunnel by George Stephenson was created (1826–29) to link Edge Hill and the new railway to the southern docks, it initially operated with a static steam engine hauling wagons through it. John Foster Jr, succeeded his father as Surveyor to the Corporation of Liverpool 1824–35 and was responsible for the design of St James Cemetery laid out (1827–29), he designed several buildings for the cemetery including the Lodge, entrance arch, the Oratory and Huskisson Monument (see the neo-classical section below for these last two) and is a Grade I Historic Park. Wavertree Botanic Gardens, originally started in the 1830s and a Grade II*, the park has a late Georgian entrance lodge. The facade of the former Grecian (1829) survives in Dale street. An unusual relic is the Hearse House (1811) in the churchyard of All Saints' Childwall. Another unusual building is the lockup (1787), Shaw Street, Everton, used to imprison drunks overnight to sober up or someone awaiting magistrates, there is a second such building in the city Wavertree Lock-up (1796).

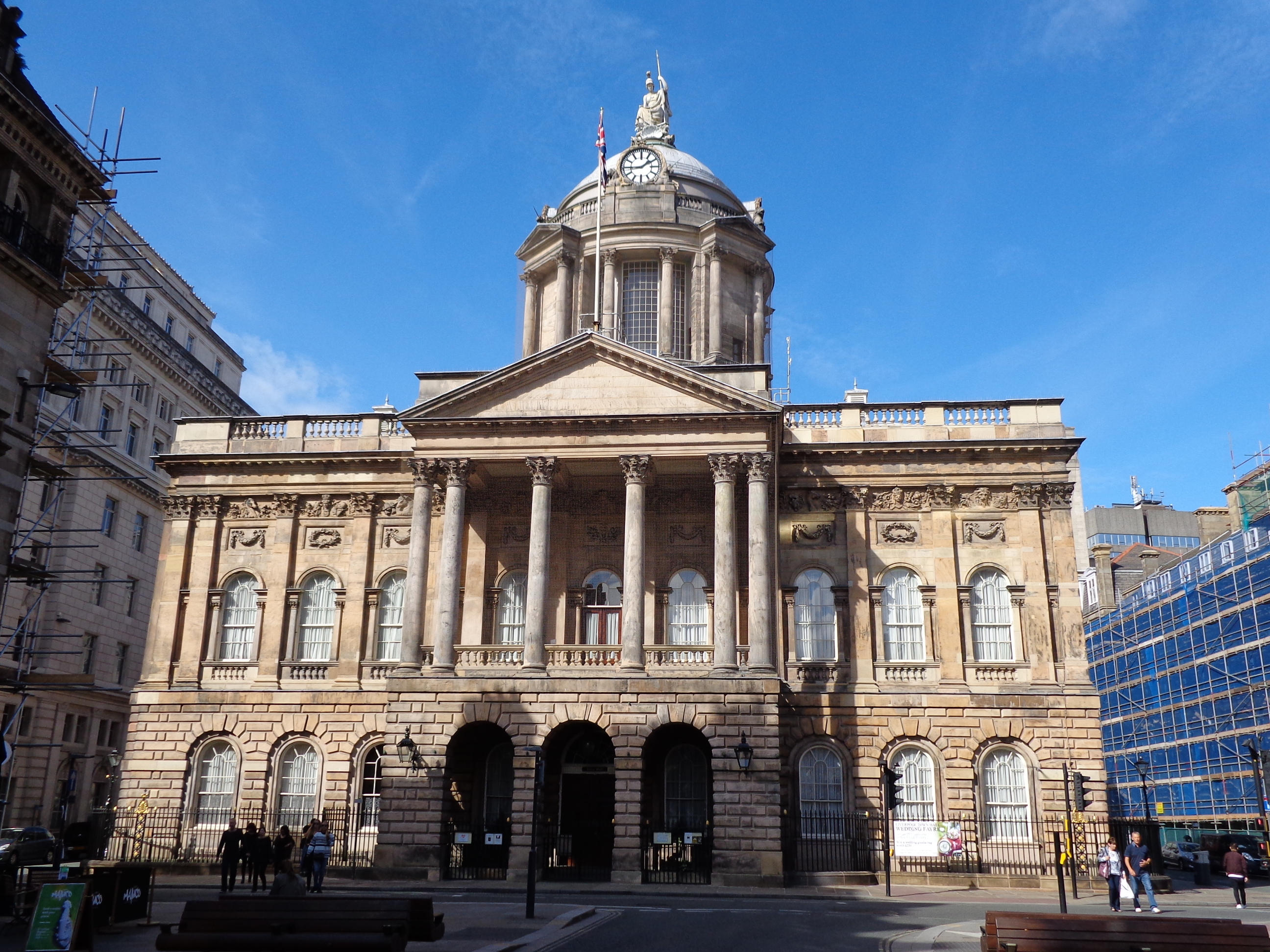
South front, Liverpool Town Hall
(1749–54; Grade I), the portico is dated 1811 and the dome 1802.

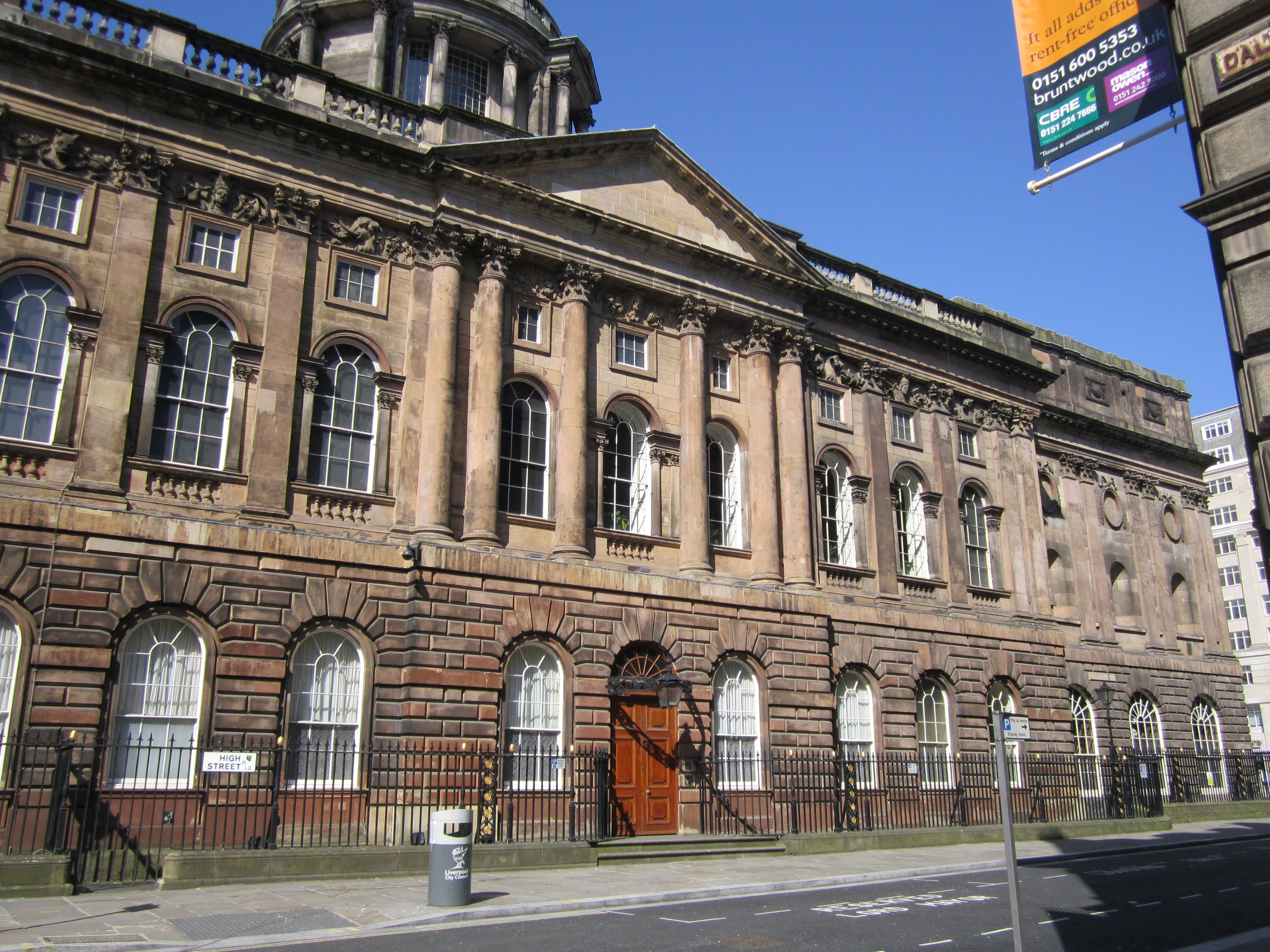
High St, front, Liverpool Town Hall, showing 1780s extension on right
(1749–54 & c.1785; Grade I)

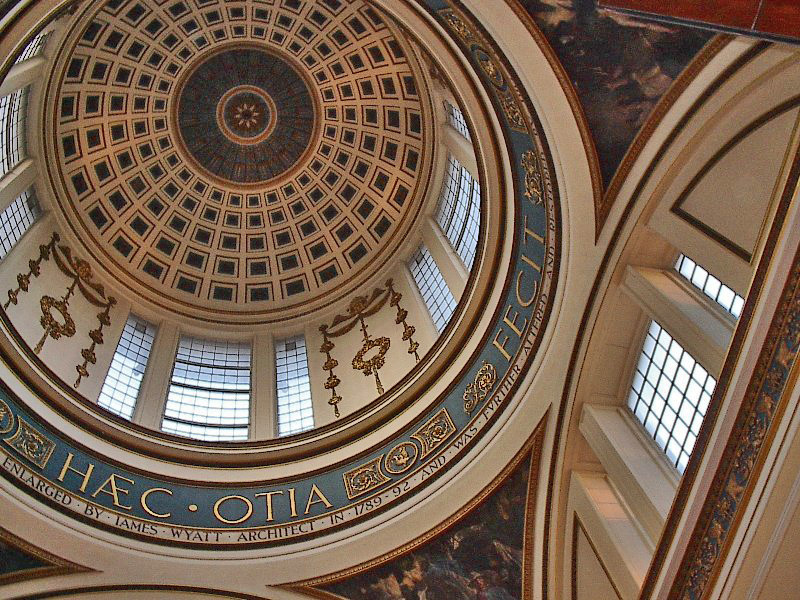
Liverpool Town Hall
Dome
(1802; Grade I)

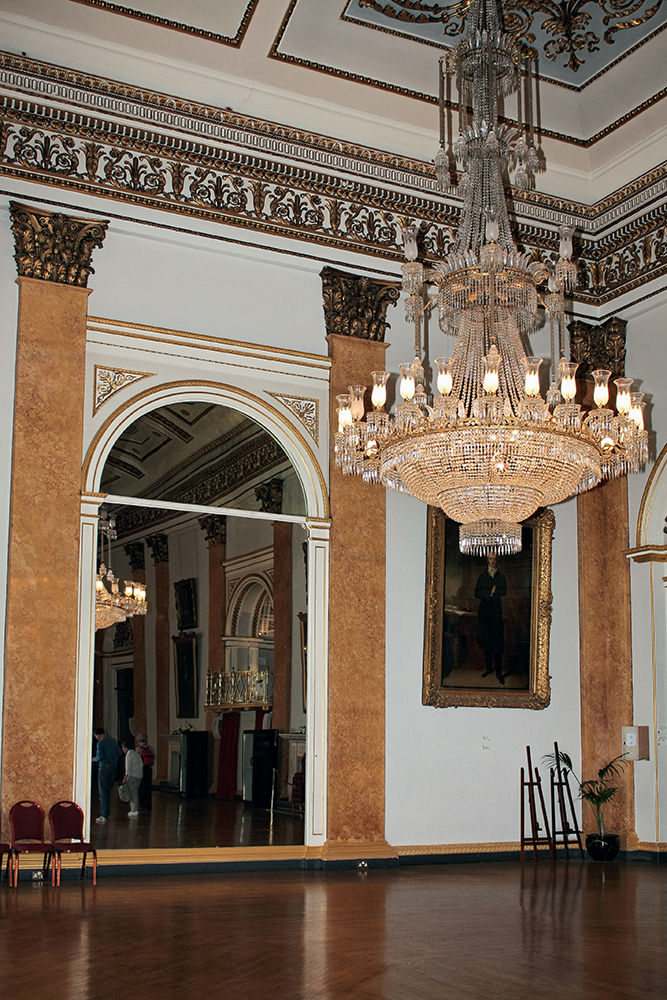
Corner of the Large Ballroom, Liverpool Town Hall
(completed 1820; Grade I)

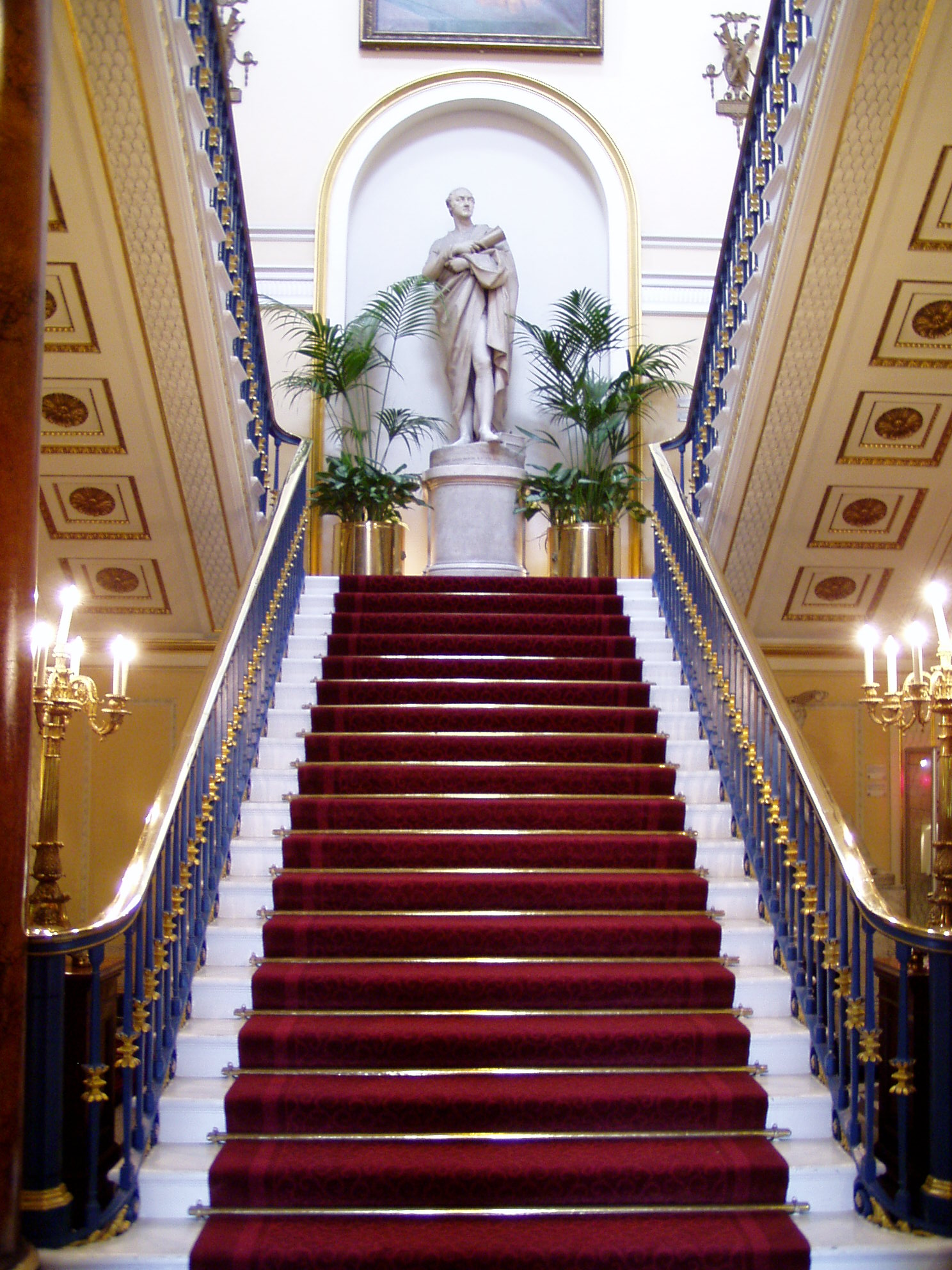
Main staircase, Liverpool Town Hall
(completed 1820; Grade I)

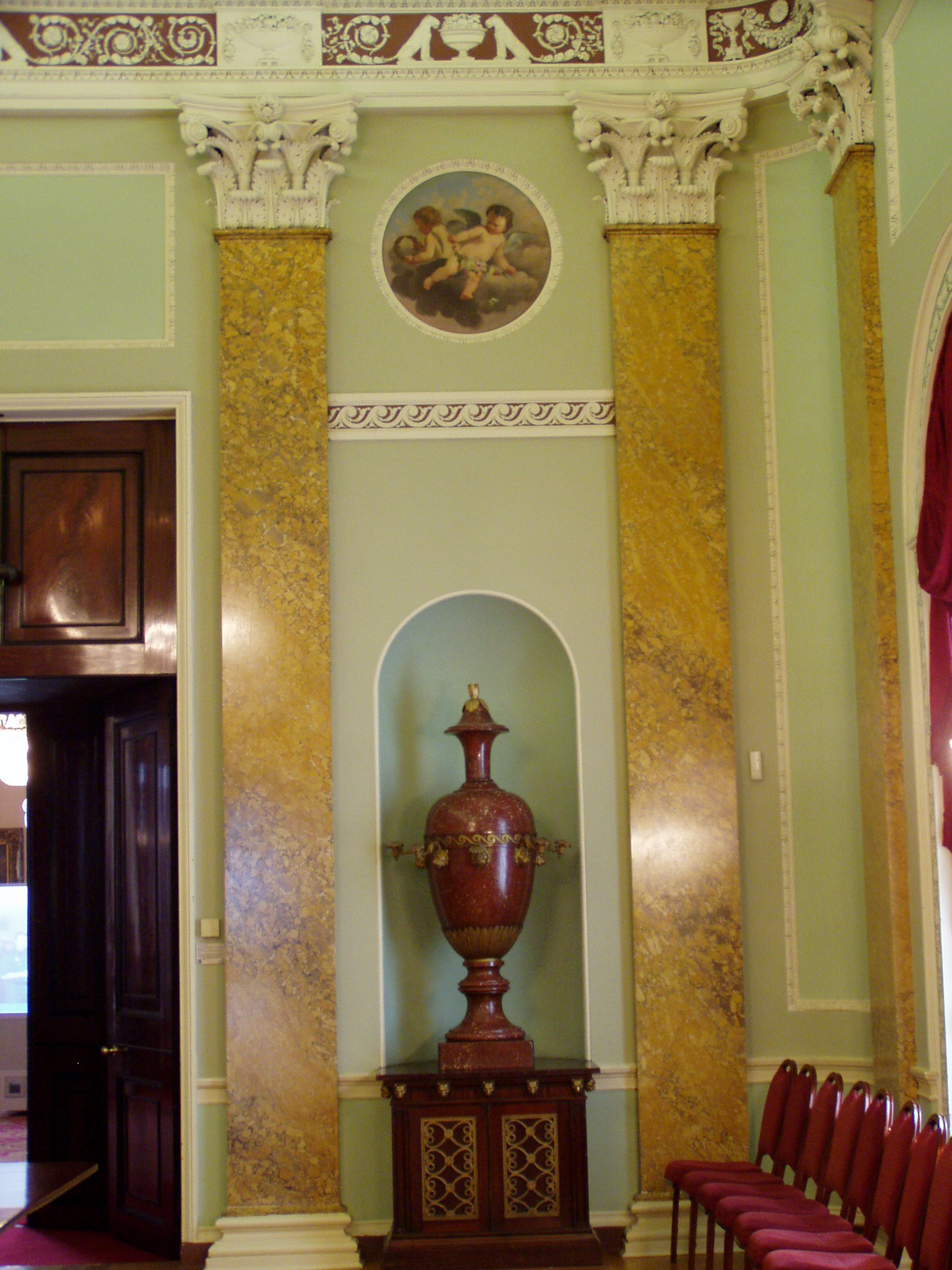
Corner of Dining Room, Liverpool Town Hall
(completed 1820; Grade I)

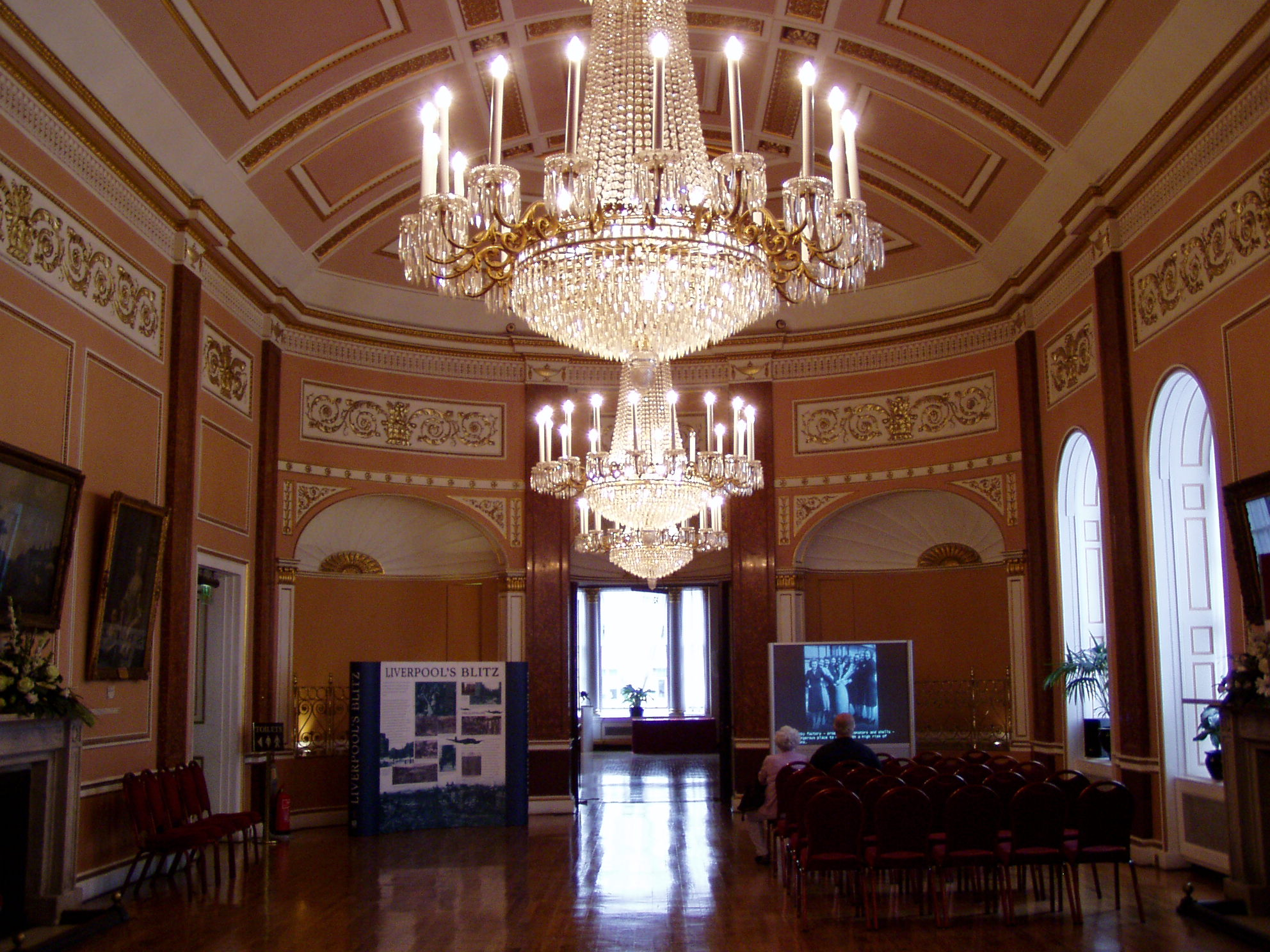
Small Ballroom, Liverpool Town Hall
(completed 1820; Grade I)

Behind the Town Hall is the Nelson Monument, it was designed by Matthew Cotes Wyatt and sculpted by Richard Westmacott as a memorial to Horation Nelson and unveiled in 1813. Westmacott also sculpted the bronze equestrian statue of George III on London Road. In the grounds of Allerton Manor, a now ruinous house in Allerton Road, lies an 18th-century obelisk.

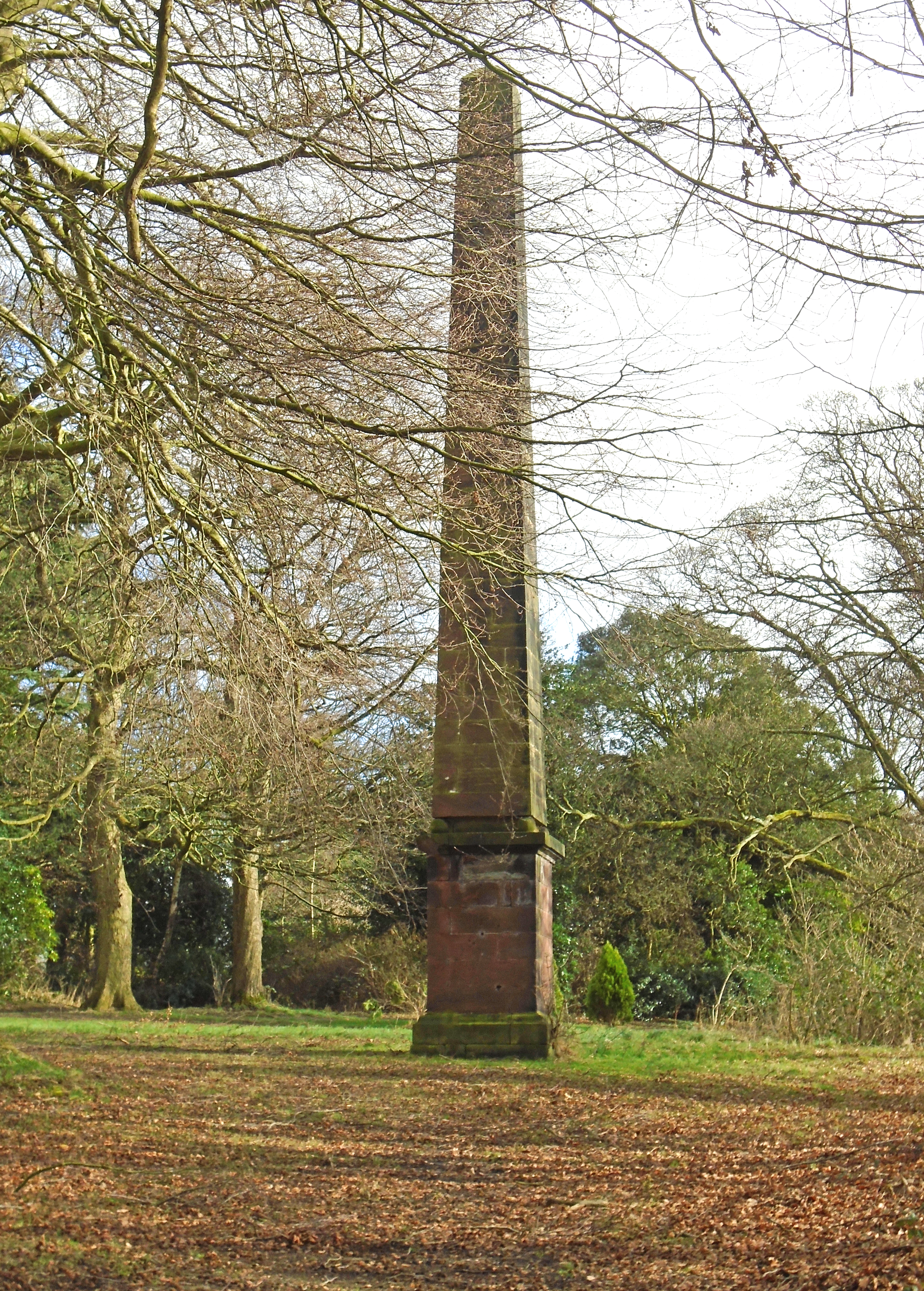
Obelisk, Allerton Manor, Allerton Road
(18th century; Grade II)

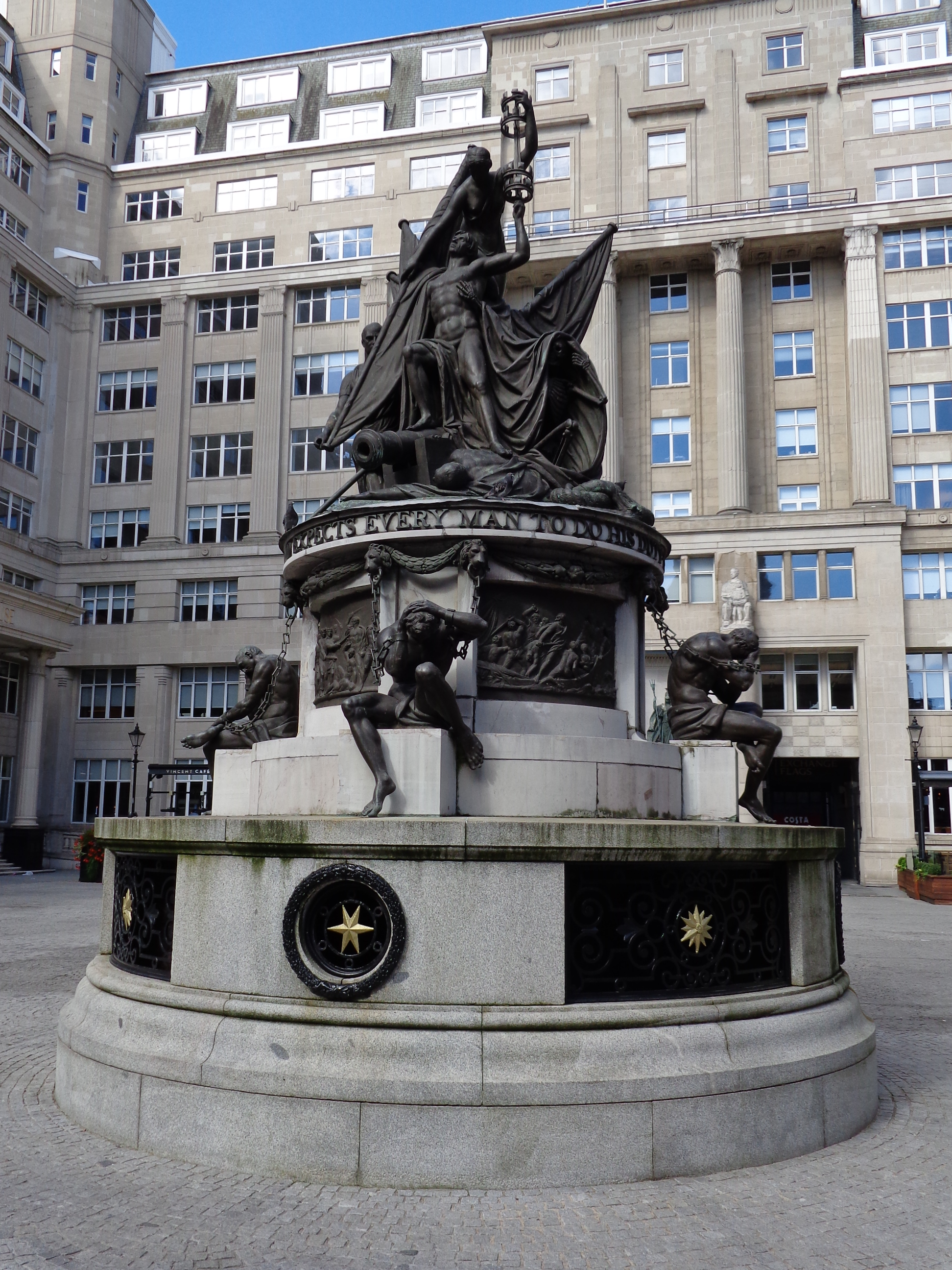
Nelson Monument, Exchange Flags
(1813; Grade II*)

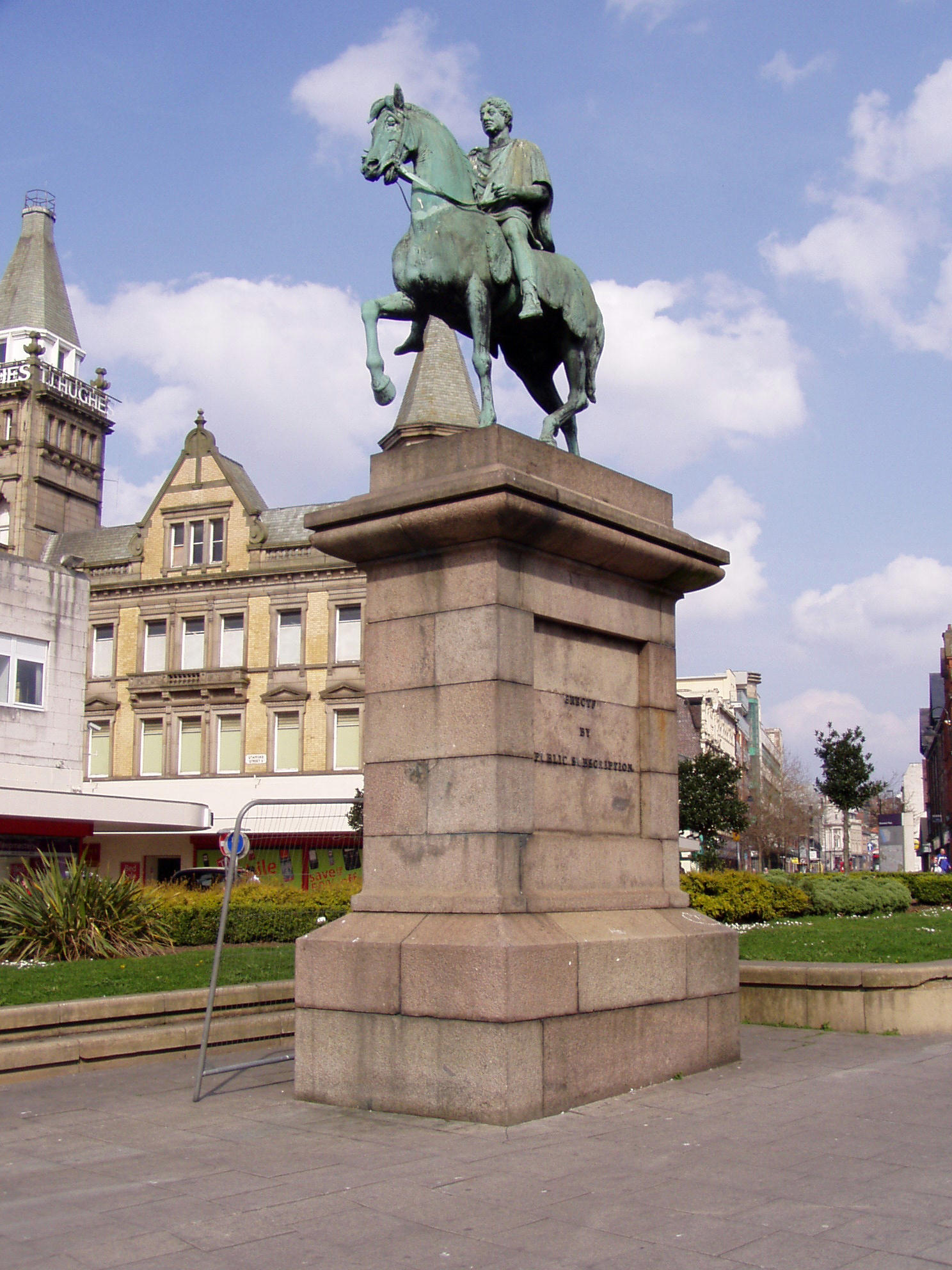
Equestrian monument to George III, London Road, by Richard Westmacott
(1818–22; Grade II)

=== Georgian commercial buildings ===
In 1786 the Liverpool Improvement Act was passed stipulating that £175,000 would be available over three years. One of the consequences was the widening of Castle Street overseen by John Foster Sr., which meant the west side of the street had to be completely rebuilt. only Nos 46, 52 & 54 survive from this period. The Thomas Parr House in Colquitt Street with warehouse behind, is a rare surviving 18th-century warehouse. In Brunswick Street is the former Bank of Arthur Heywood and Sons (1798–1800), possibly the design of John Foster Sr. There is an interesting example of a late Georgian Gothic inn building in the Childwall Abbey Hotel. The Union News Room (1800) in Duke Street was designed by John Foster Sr. The facade of the former Grecian Hotel, 51–55 Dale Street survives as part of a modern office block. Harrington Chambers (c.1830) is a rare survival of Georgian shops with office floors above. No 75-79 Bold Street (c.1833), by Joseph Franklin, is an example of Greek Revival architecture.

Some of Liverpool's landmarks are mainly known for their oddness, such as the Williamson Tunnels which are architecturally unique as the largest underground folly in the world.

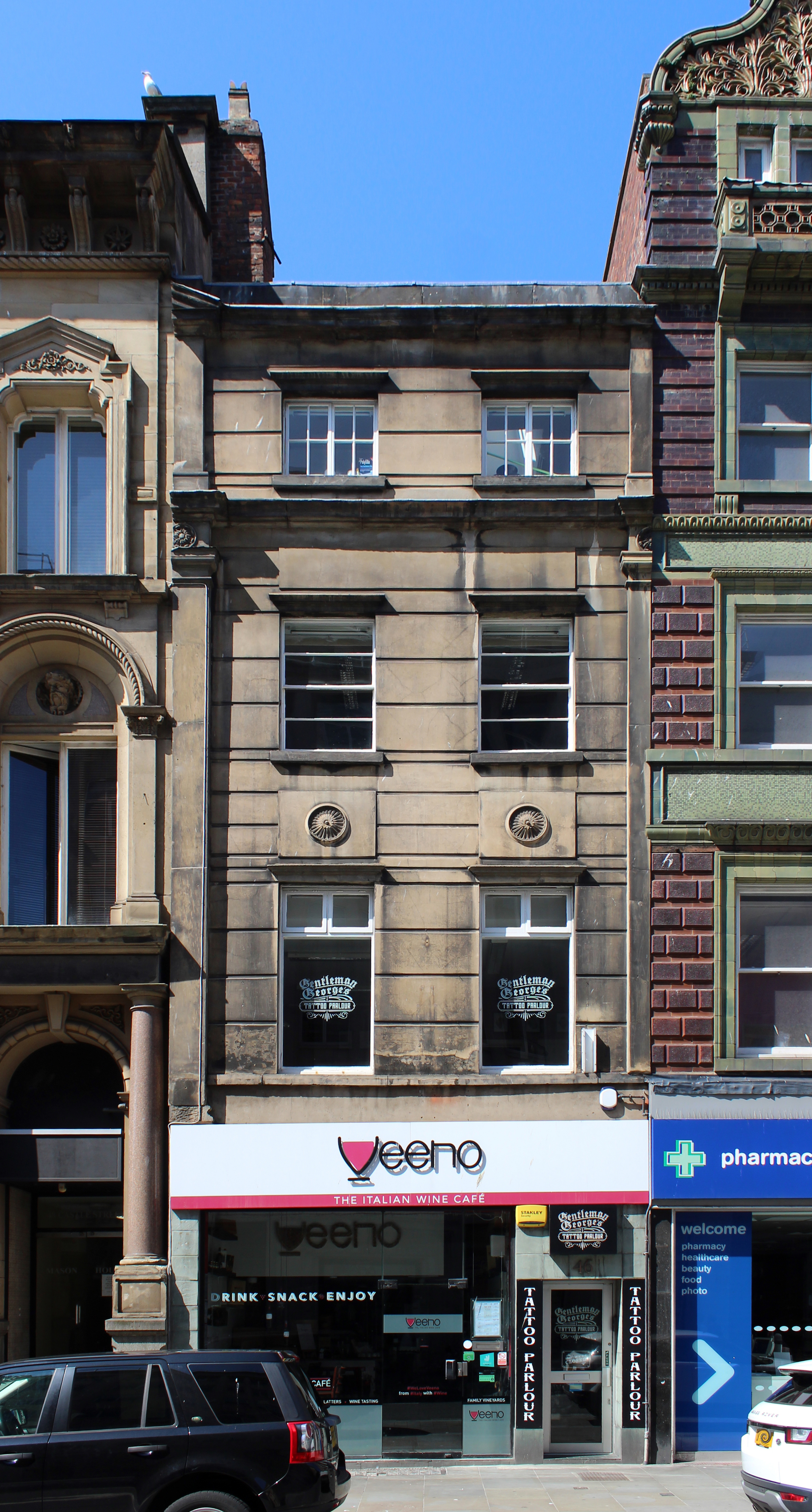
46 Castle Street
(late 18th century; Grade II)

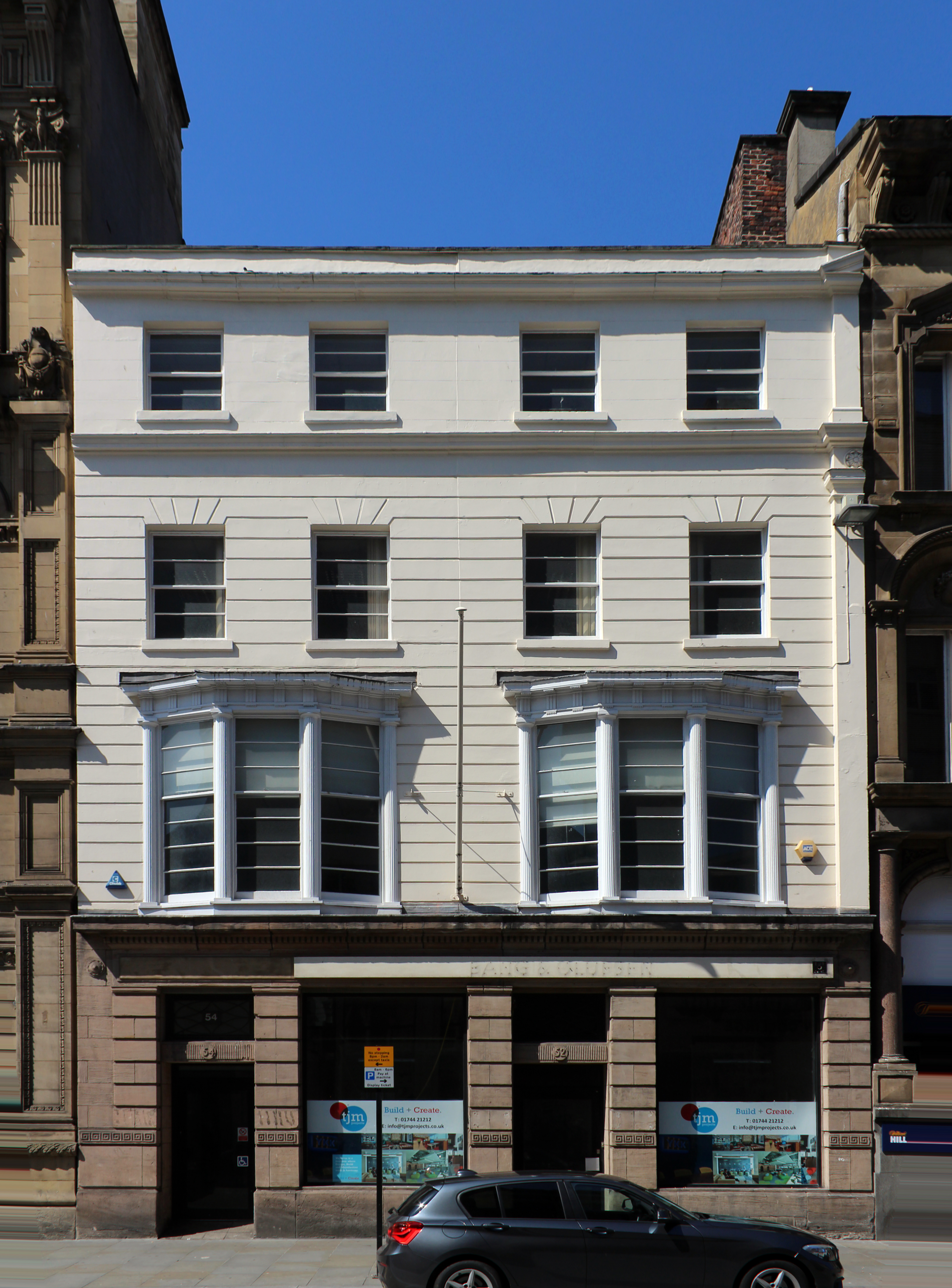
52-54 Castle Street
(late 18th century; Grade II)

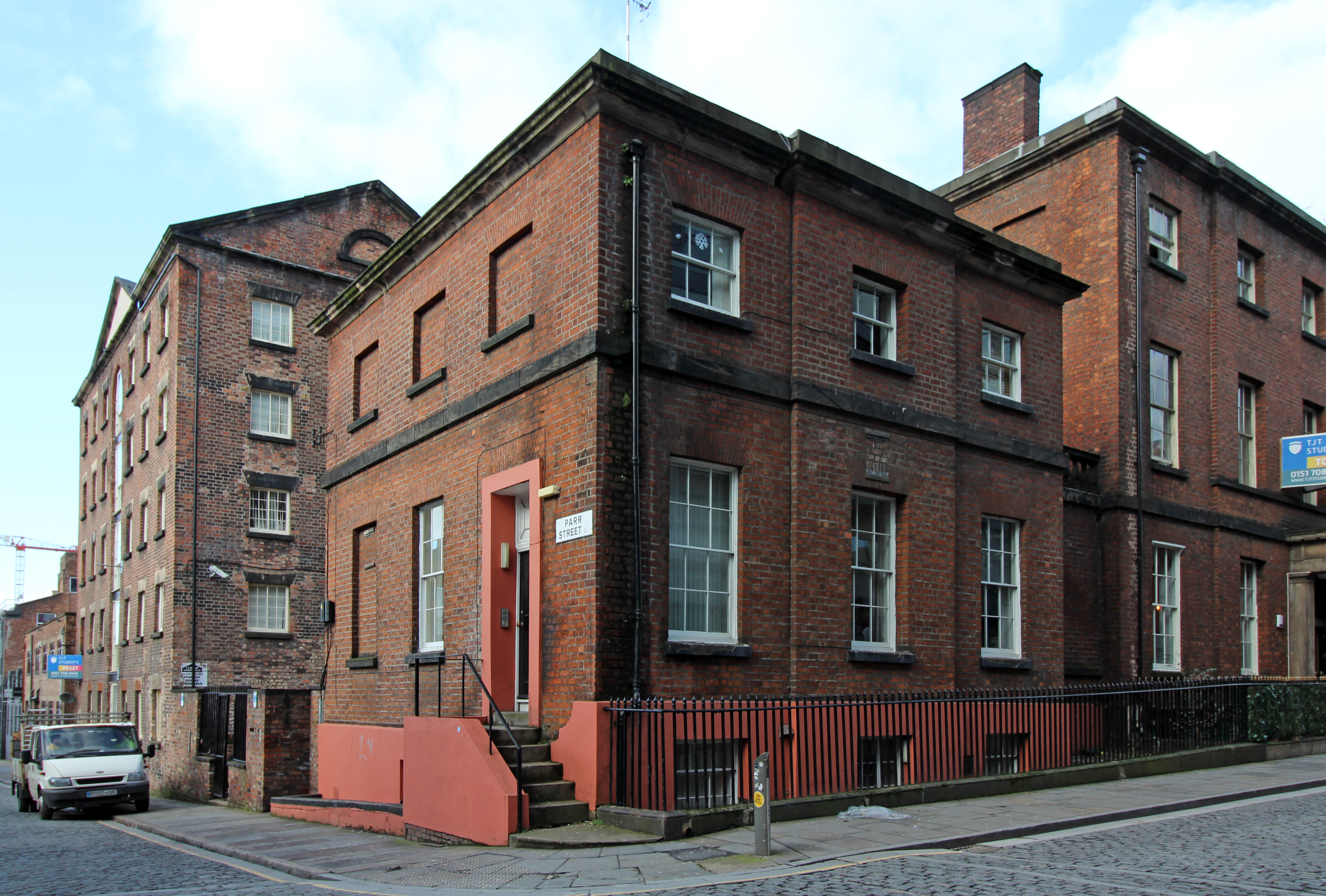
Thomas Parr House with warehouse behind, 26 Colquitt Street
1799; Grade II)

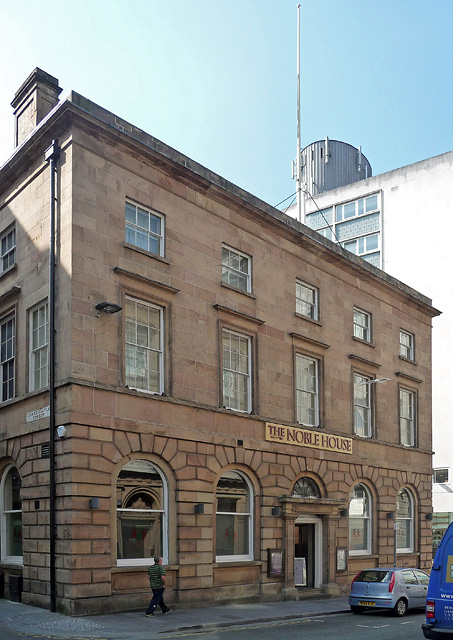
Heywood's Bank, 5 Brunswick Street
(1798–1800; Grade II) one of the earliest purpose-built banks

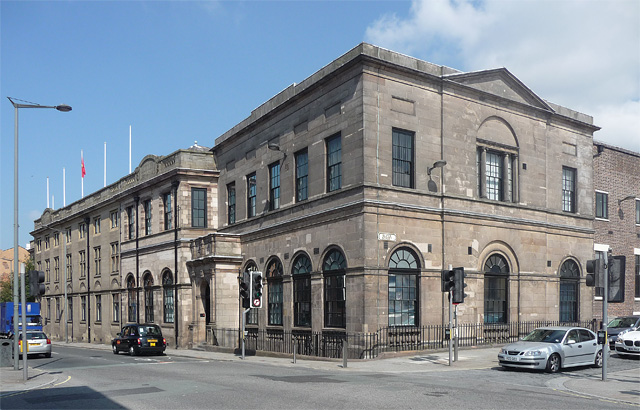
Union News Room, Duke Street
(1800; Grade II)

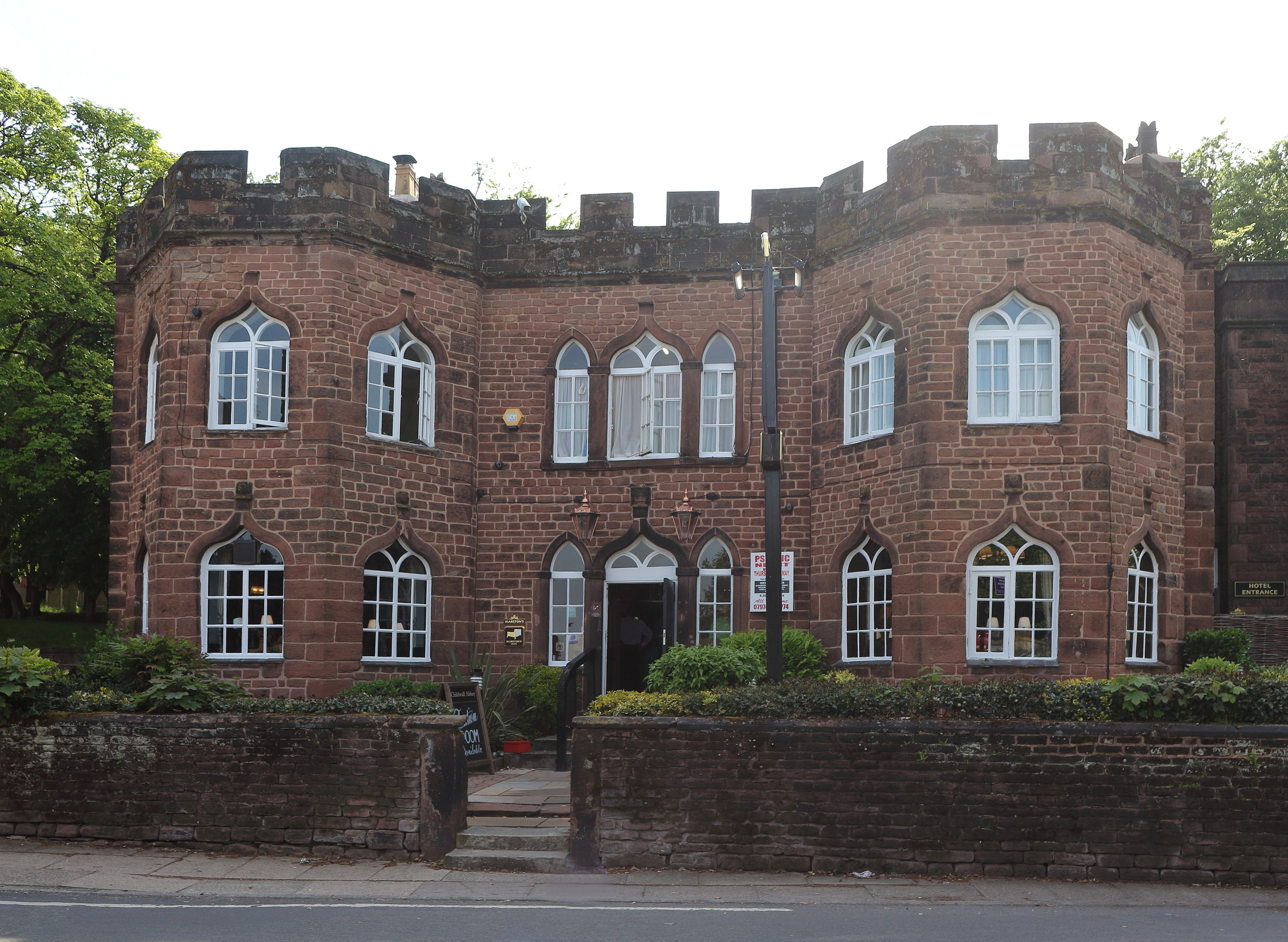
Childwall Abbey Hotel, Childwall Lane
(1820s; Grade II)

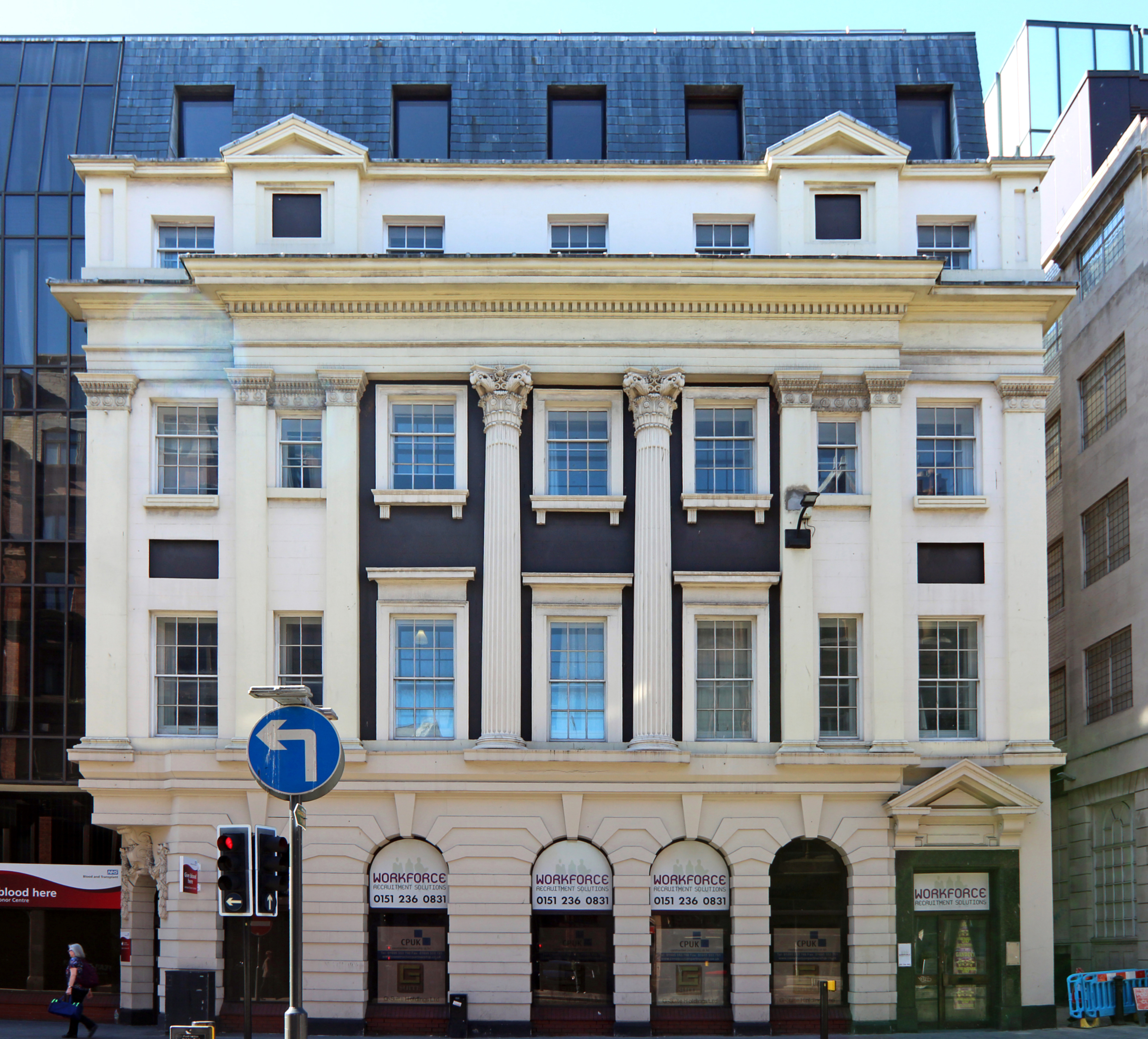
Surviving facade of former Grecian Hotel, 51-55 Dale Street
(1829; Grade II)

=== Georgian churches ===
Liverpool has several churches built in the Georgian era, these are: The Church of England Church of St James, built-in 1774–75 by Cuthbert Bisbrown, it has a later chancel and other alterations have been made. The oldest surviving Roman Catholic church in the city (now a restaurant) is St. Peter's Roman Catholic Church, Liverpool (1788) built three years before the Roman Catholic Relief Act 1791. Holy Trinity Church, Wavertree (1794) was designed by John Hope, as an Anglican chapel and a new chancel was added (1911) by Charles Reilly. The Anglican Church of Our Lady and St Nicholas is Liverpool's parish church. Colloquially known as "the sailors' church", it has existed near the waterfront since 1257. The current building, designed by Thomas Harrison, was begun in 1811 following the catastrophic collapse of the old tower. While Harrison's tower is still original, the main body of the church has been rebuilt following Second World War damage. Another example of Georgian Gothic architecture is the Church of St Luke, Liverpool designed in 1802 by John Foster Sr. & John Foster Jr. (both men were born in Liverpool), it was built in 1811–32. St Mary's Edge Hill was built (1812–13) and extended (1825–25) architect unknown. Thomas Rickman who began his career as an architect in Liverpool designed two churches in the city, both for the Church of England St George's Church, Everton in 1813–1815 with its unusual cast iron interior and St Michael's Church, Aigburth in 1814–1815 altered in 1900 by W. & G. Audsley, both are examples of late Georgian Gothic Revival architecture. John Slater designed the Roman Catholic St Patrick's Church, Liverpool in 1821–27 in a simple classical style, also for the same denomination is the gothic St Anthony's Church, Scotland Road 1832–33 by John Broadbent a pupil of Rickman's. Built for the Presbyterian's, St Andrew's Church, Liverpool by Daniel Stewart with the facade by John Foster Jr. was long derelict, but was restored in 2015 as student accommodation. The tower of St Mary's Church, Walton-on-the-Hill dates from 1828 to 1832 and was designed by John Broadbent. St John the Evangelist, Knotty Ash (1834–36) is an example of Georgian Gothic. Several Georgian parish churches and chapels have been demolished in the centre of Liverpool, see the demolished Georgian buildings section below for details.

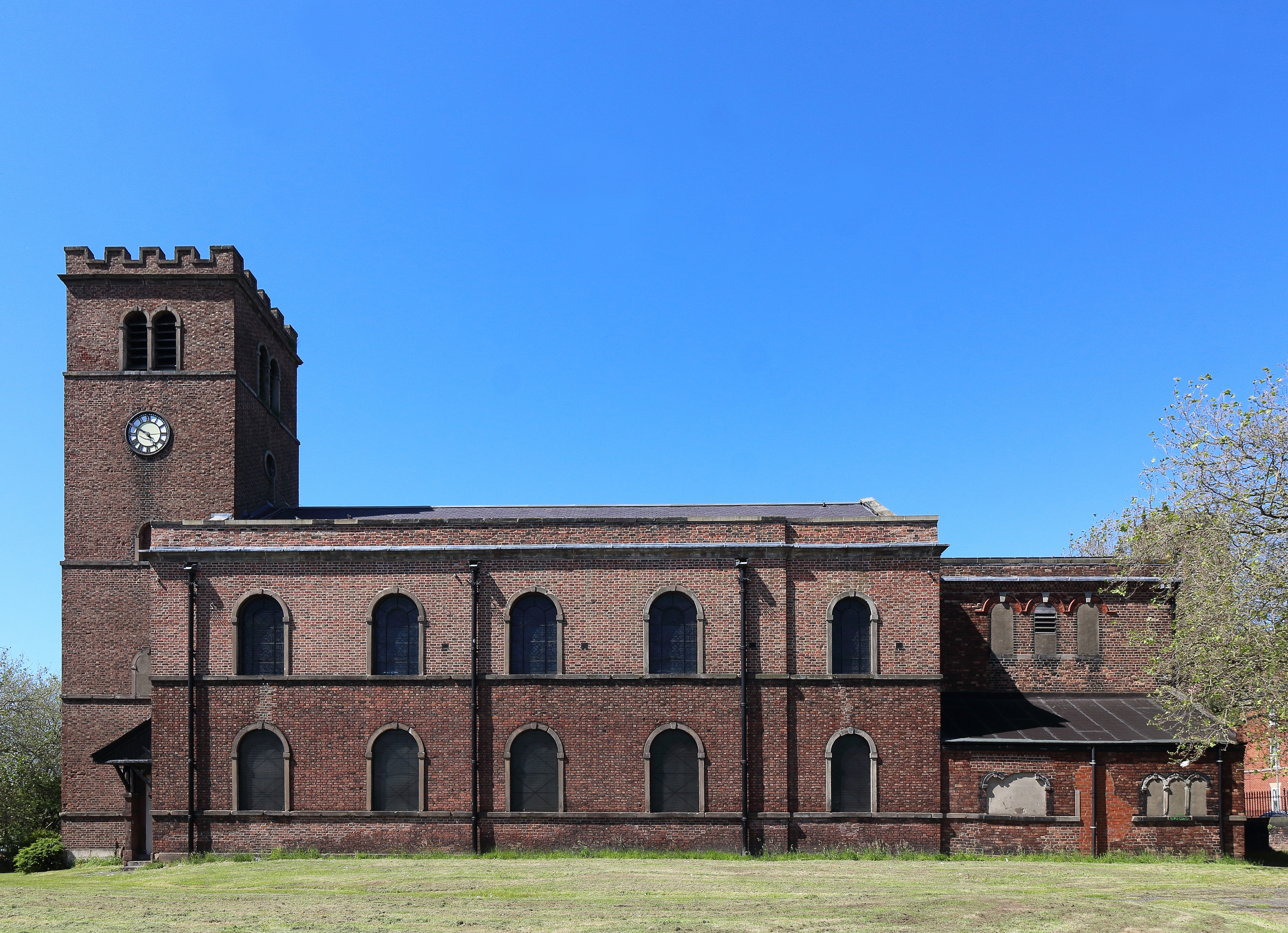
St James, St James Place, Toxteth
(1774–75; Grade II*)

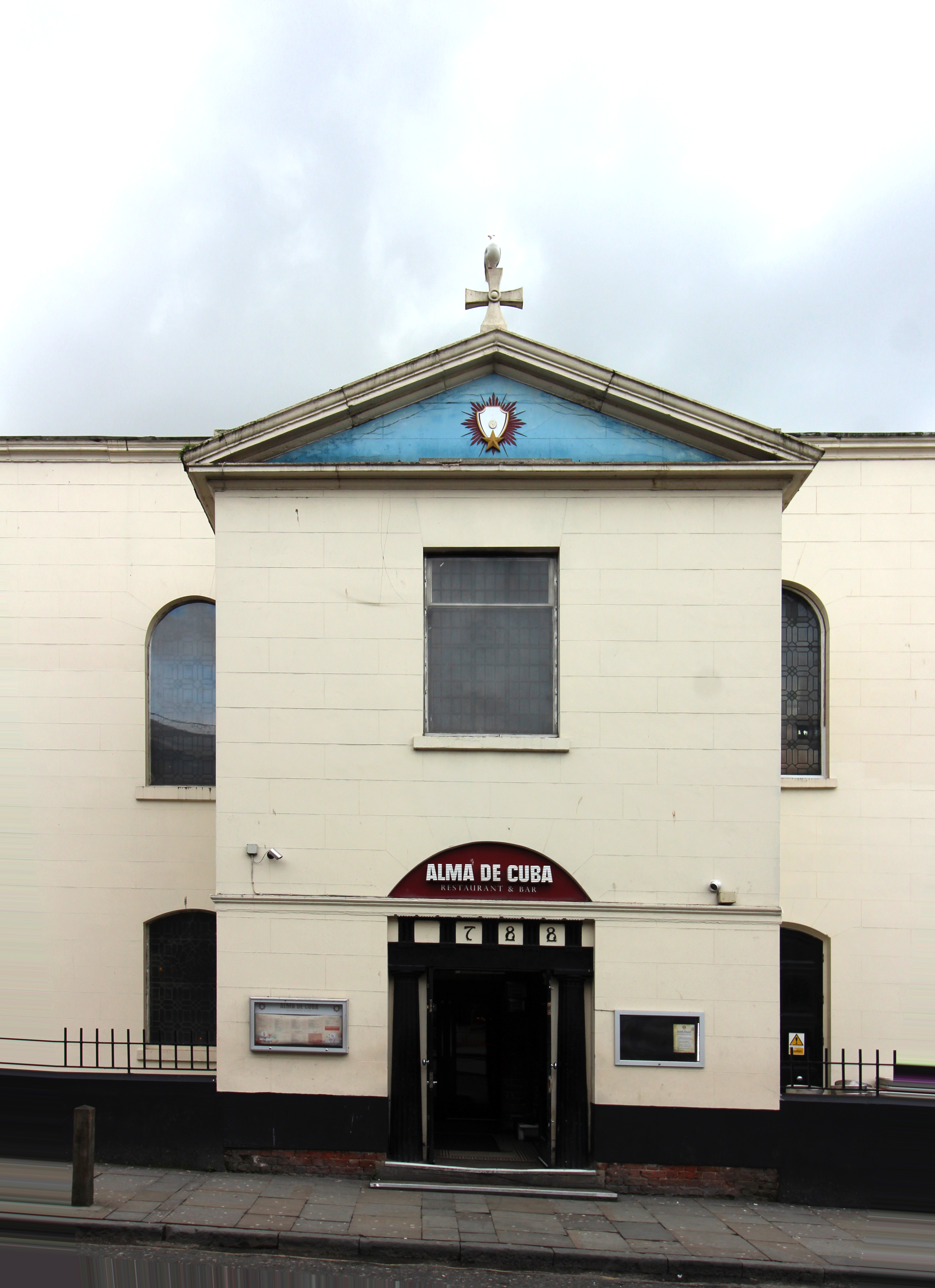
Former St Peter's, Seel Street
(1788; Grade II)

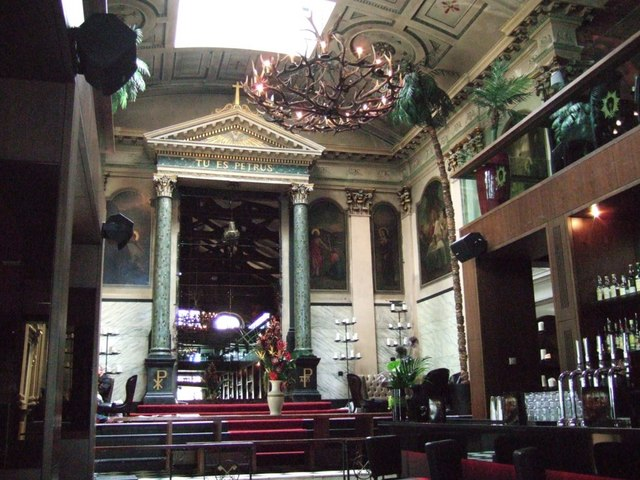
Interior, St Peter's, Seel Street
(1788; Grade II)

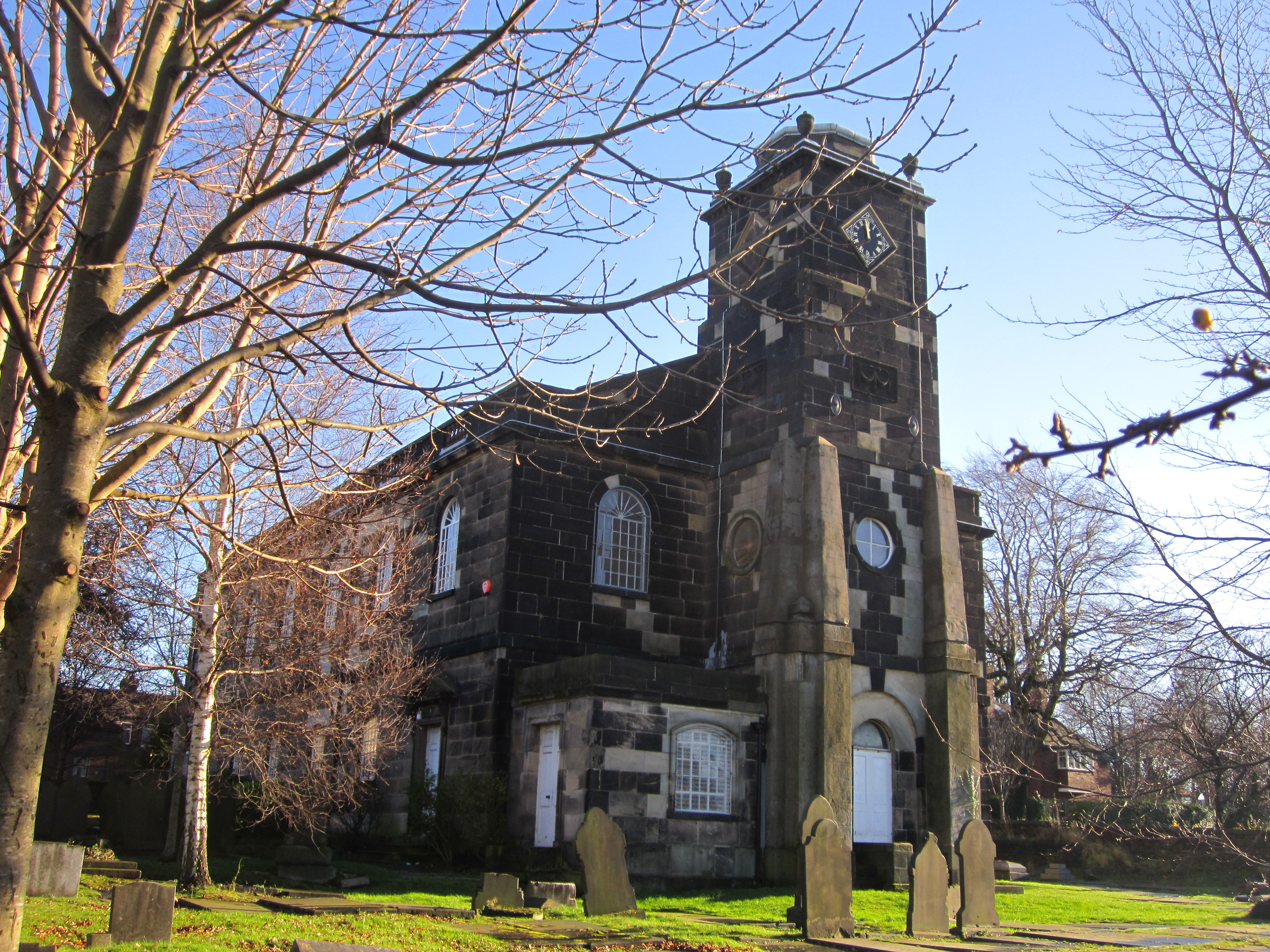
Holy Trinity, Church Road, Wavertree
(1794 altered 1911; Grade II*)

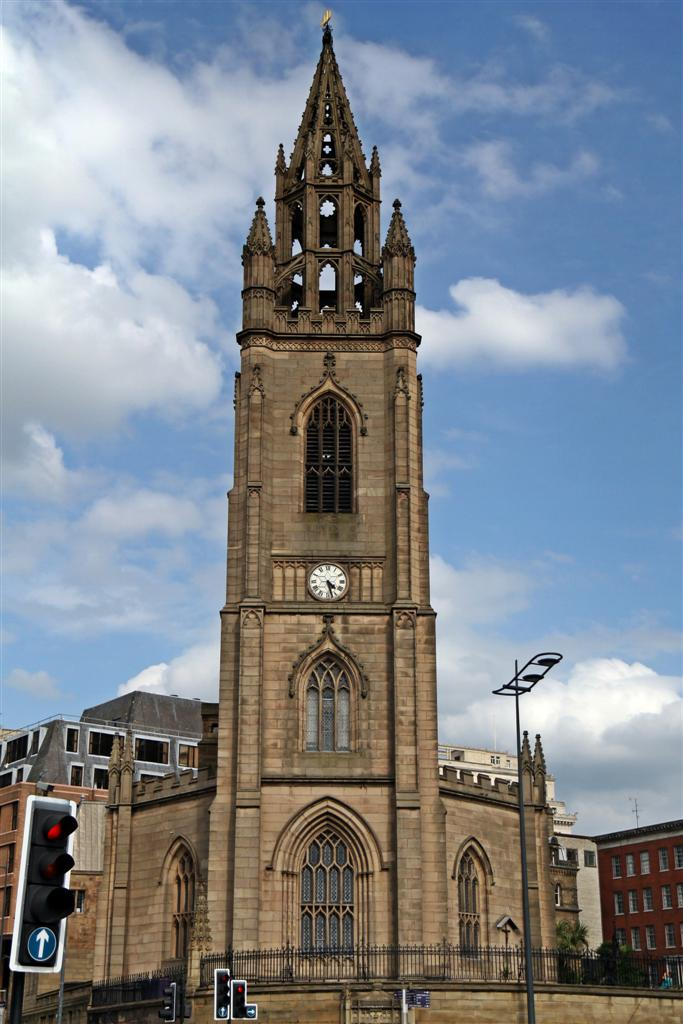
The tower of Our Lady and Saint Nicholas
(1811–15; Grade II)

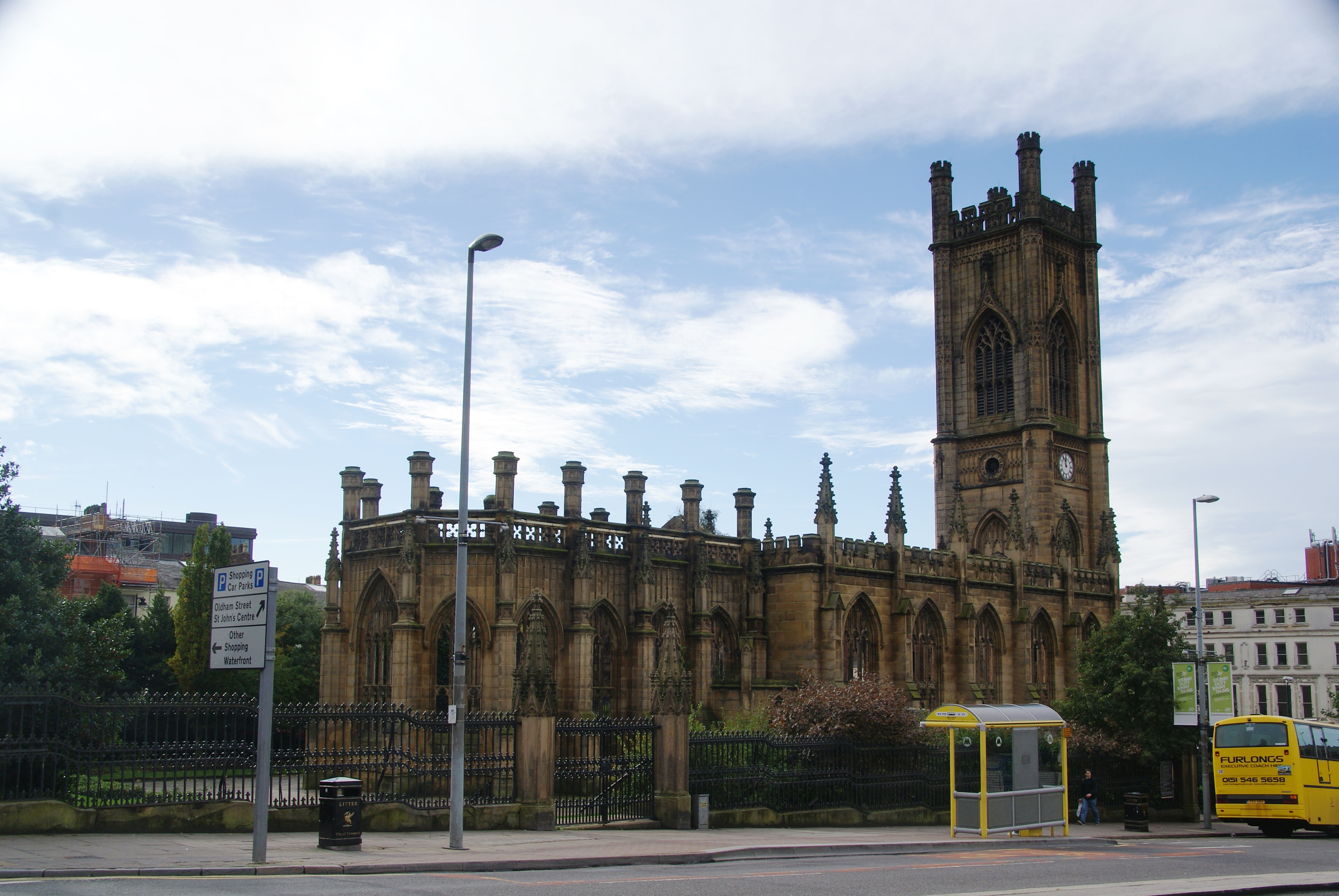
St. Luke's Church, corner of Berry Street and Leece Street,
(1811–32; Grade II*)

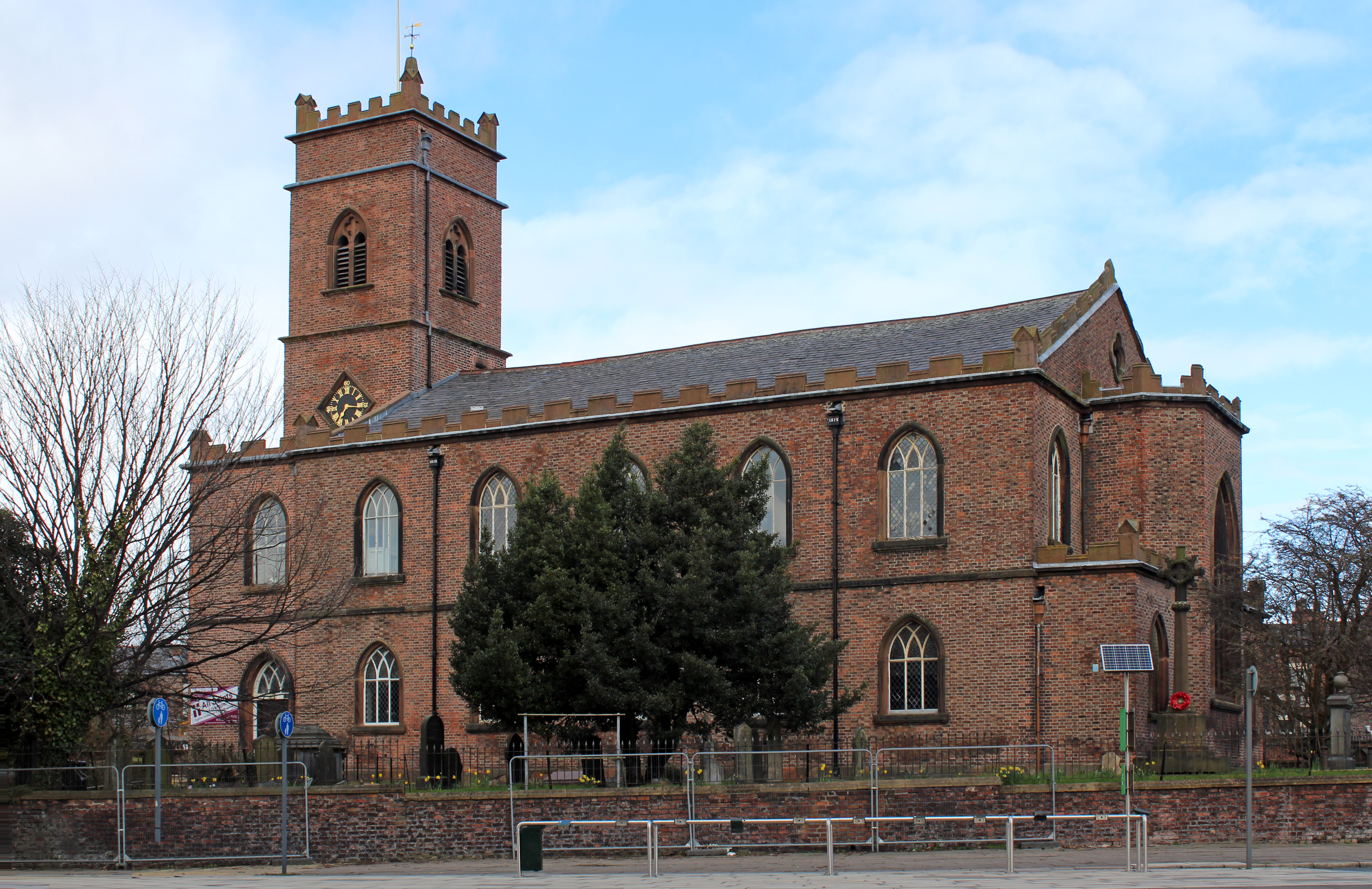
St Mary's, Edge Hill
(1812–13 & 1824–25; Grade II)

== 19th century neo-classical buildings ==
Liverpool has a rich tradition of neo-classical architecture running through the late Georgian right to the end of the Victorian period. Some prime early examples are the Lyceum by Thomas Harrison (1802), the Wellington Rooms by Edmund Aikin (1815–16; a grade II* listed building, now at risk in a "very bad" condition). The Oratory using a Greek Doric style, by John Foster Jr. (1829) who based the building on the Temple of Hephaestus in Athens, also by Foster is the Huskisson Monument (1834) in St. James Cemetery based on the Choragic Monument of Lysicrates, these are pure examples of Greek Revival architecture. Also impressive is the grade I listed Bank of England Building built by Charles Robert Cockerell between 1845 and 1848(Cockerell spent the years 1810–1815 studying ancient buildings in Greece with John Foster Jr.) and the North and South Wales Bank in Derby Square by Edward Corbett and is now known as Castle Moat House. Liverpool Institute High School for Boys (1835–37) was designed by Arthur Hill Holme. Liverpool Medical Institution (1836–37) was designed by Clark Rampling.

The unique ensemble of High Victorian neo-classical buildings around William Brown Street has been labelled the city's "Cultural Quarter". Located here are the William Brown Library and Museum (1857–60), paid for by William Brown, based on a design by Thomas Allom the building was modified in execution by John Weightman the corporation surveyor to save money; it now houses the World Museum Liverpool and Liverpool Central Library, the Picton Library by Cornelius Sherlock (1875–79), and the Walker Art Gallery, paid for by Andrew Barclay Walker, designed by Sherlock and H. H. Vale (1874–77) and was extended by Sherlock (1882–84) with additional galleries at the back. Not strictly a neo-classical design and much closer to Beaux-Arts architecture, the County Sessions House (1882–84) by Liverpool architects F & G Holme. next to the Walker fits in with its more playful classical vocabulary. Dominating the area, the magnificent St George's Hall was built 1841–54 to a design by Harvey Lonsdale Elmes and after Elmes's early death C.R. Cockerell designed the interiors, most notably the great hall and small concert room, this last was entirely Cockerell's design. It served a variety of civic functions, including that of a concert hall and as the city's law courts. Alluding to the ancient Roman SPQR, its doors are inscribed with the letters S.P.Q.L. (initials for the Latin phrase Senatus PopulusQue Liverpudliensis—"the senate and people of Liverpool"). Together with its grand architecture, this proclaims the municipal pride and ambition of the city in the mid-19th century. Also nearby are Wellington's Column designed by Andrew Lawson with a sculpture by George Anderson Lawson and the Steble Fountain.

"St George's Hall is much more prominent than the Royal Exchange. From its high position in Lime Street, opposite Liverpool's main railway station, the enormous edifice dominated the city from the first. Later the clearing of the area behind it and the erection of a range of more or less harmonious public structures to the north made it the center of one of the most impressive open spaces created in Victorian England" Henry-Russell Hitchcock

There are a few places of worship in the neo-classical style in Liverpool, St Bride's Church, Liverpool (1829–30) by Samuel Rowland and Great George Street Congregational Church (1840–41) by Joseph Franklin surveyor to Liverpool Corporation.

The Dock Office at the Albert Dock was constructed in (1848) to a design by Philip Hardwick, the portico and its Tuscan columns are of cast iron.

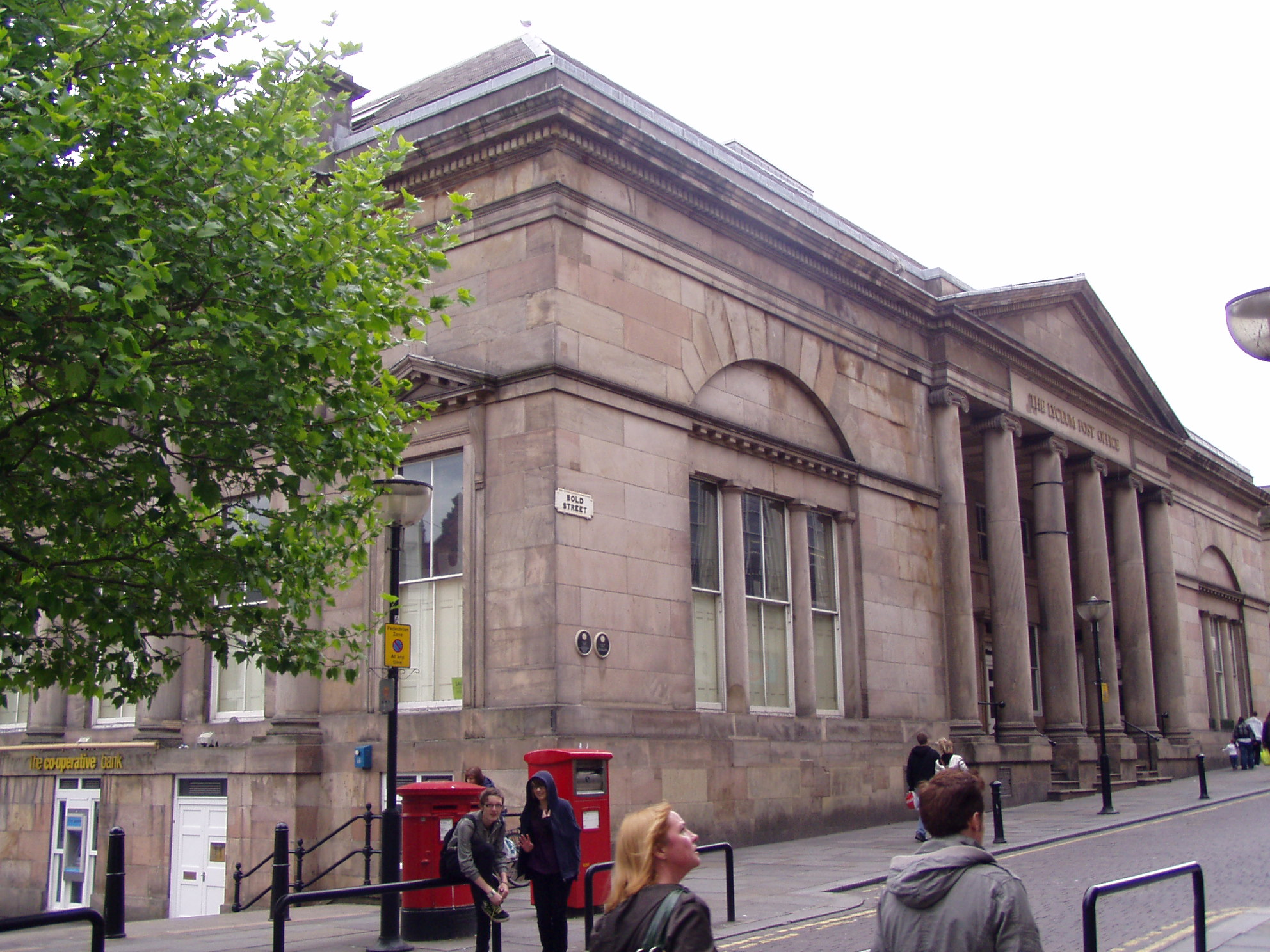
The Lyceum, Bold Street
(1802; Grade II*)
Europe's first lending library

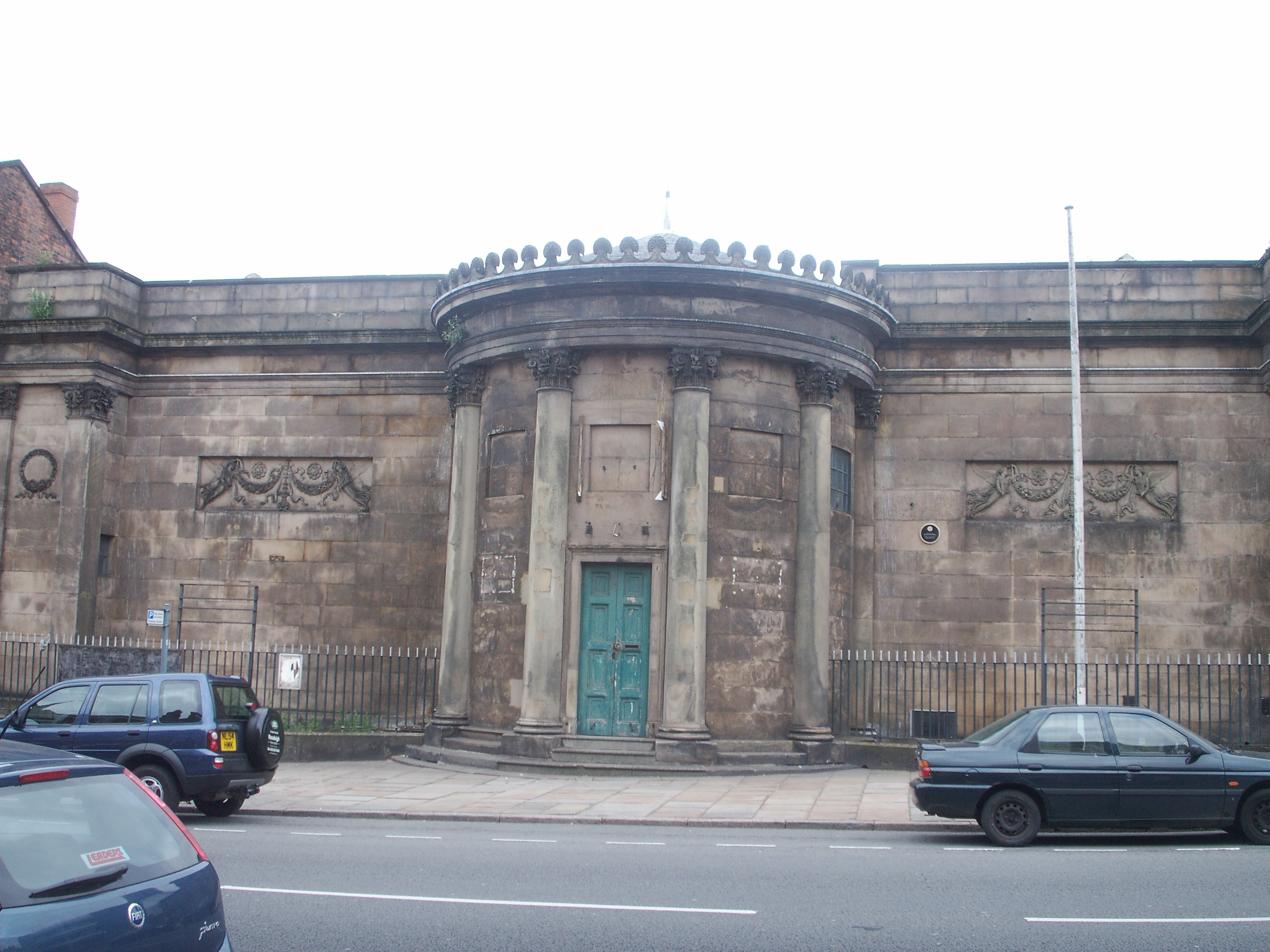
Wellington Rooms, Mount Pleasant
(1816; Grade II*)

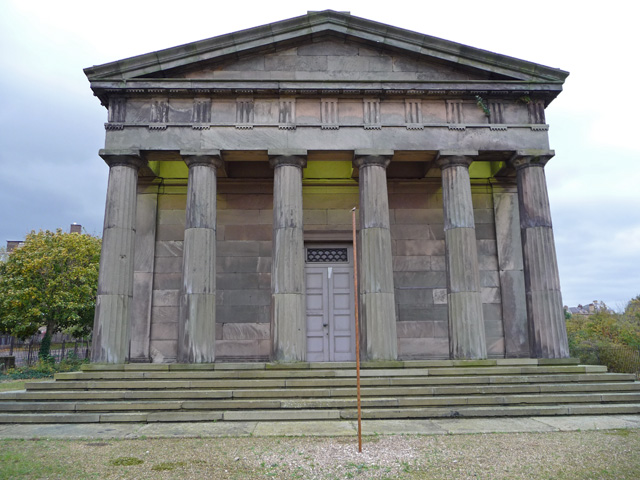
The Oratory, St James Cemetery
(1829; Grade I)

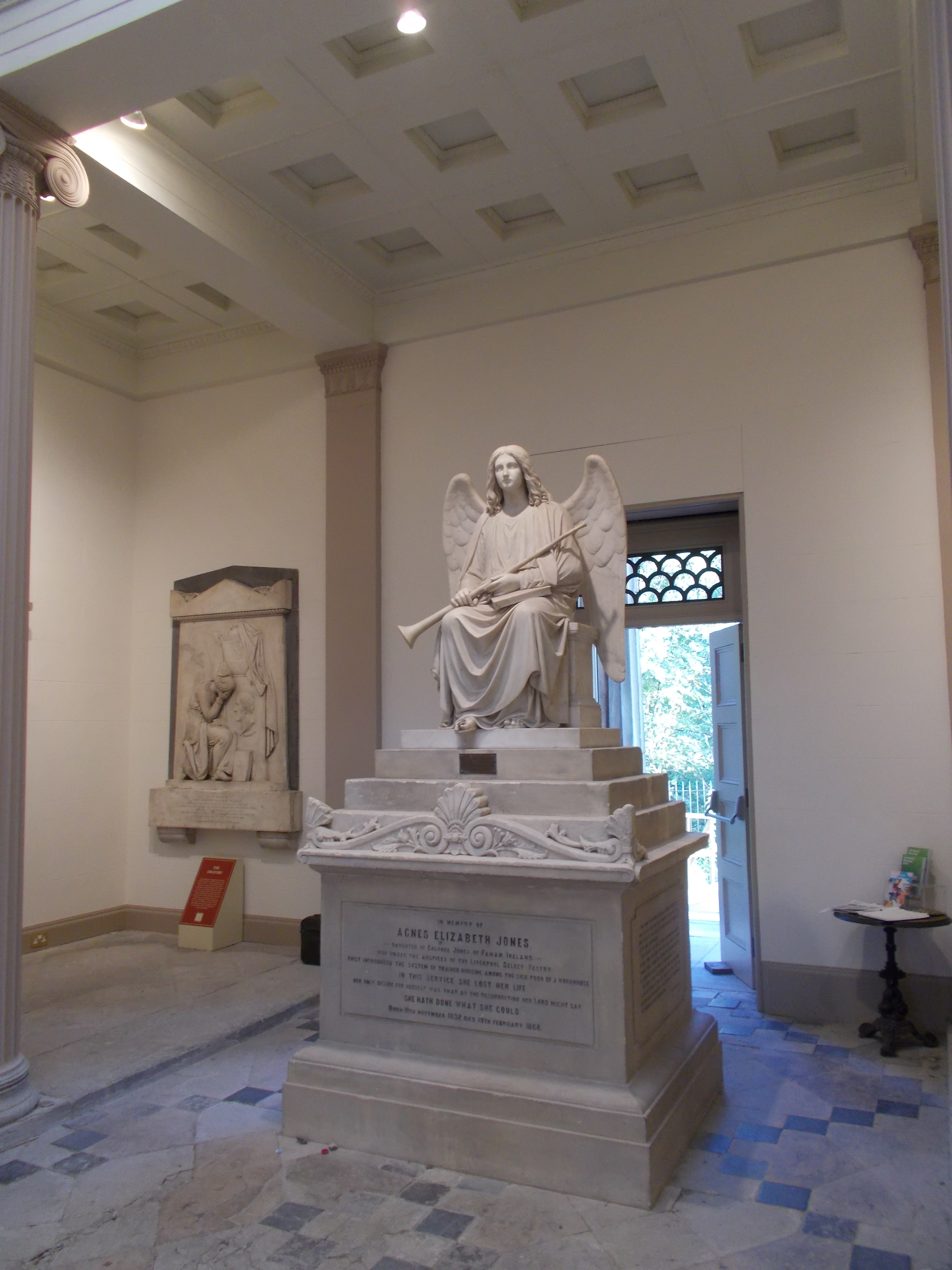
The Oratory interior
(1829; Grade I)

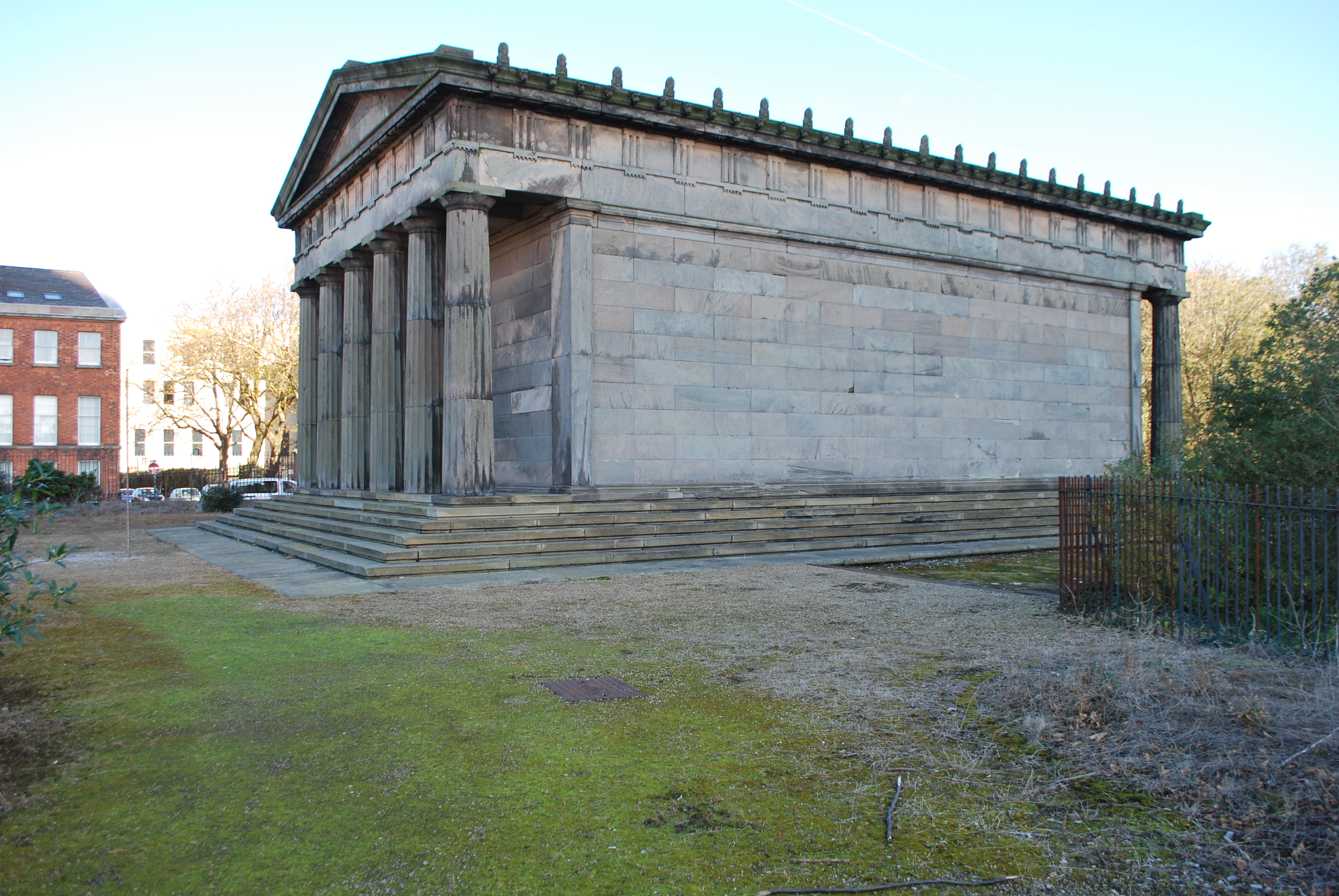
The Oratory interior
(1829; Grade I)

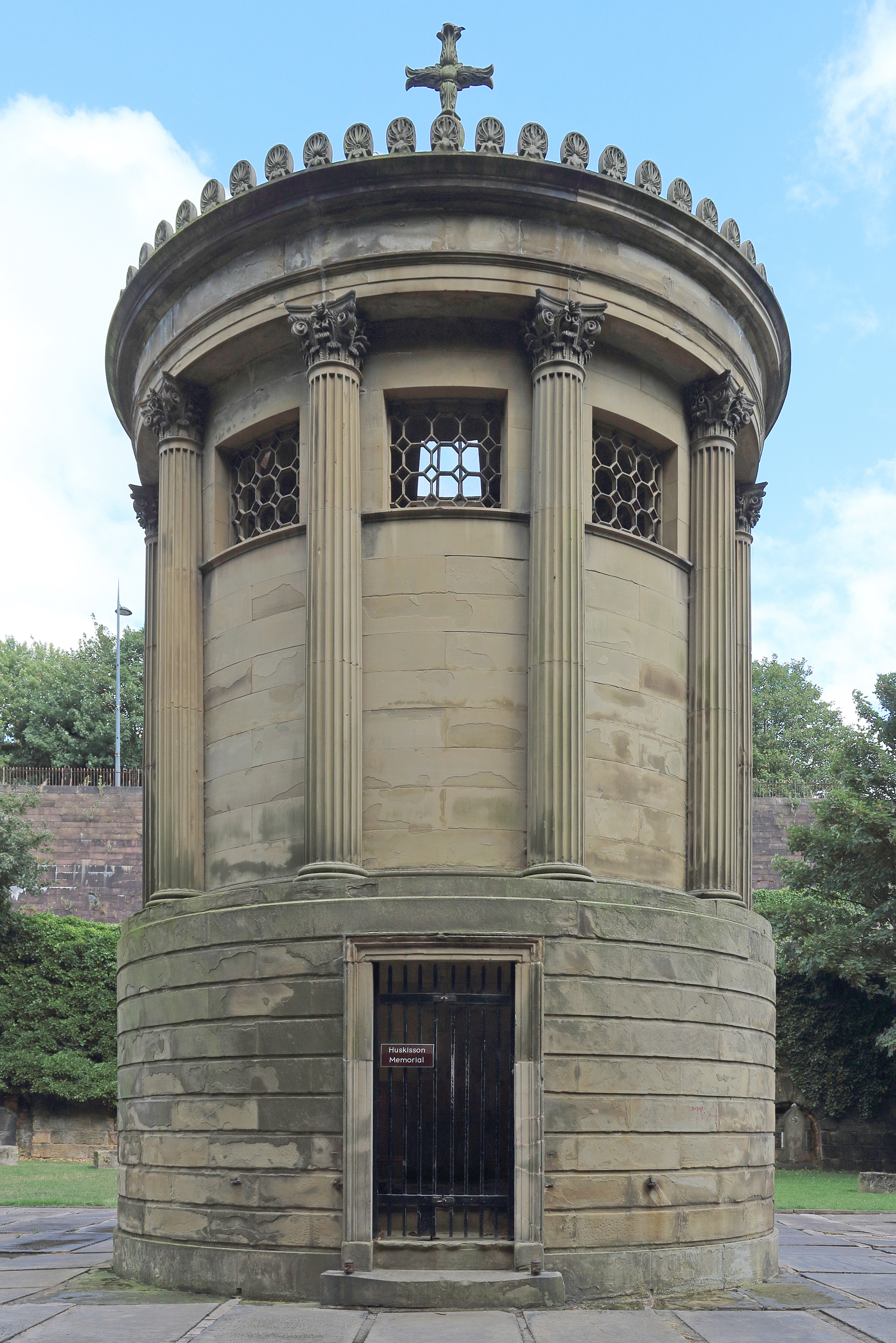
Monument to William Huskisson
(1834; Grade II)
at St James Cemetery
(1829; Grade I)

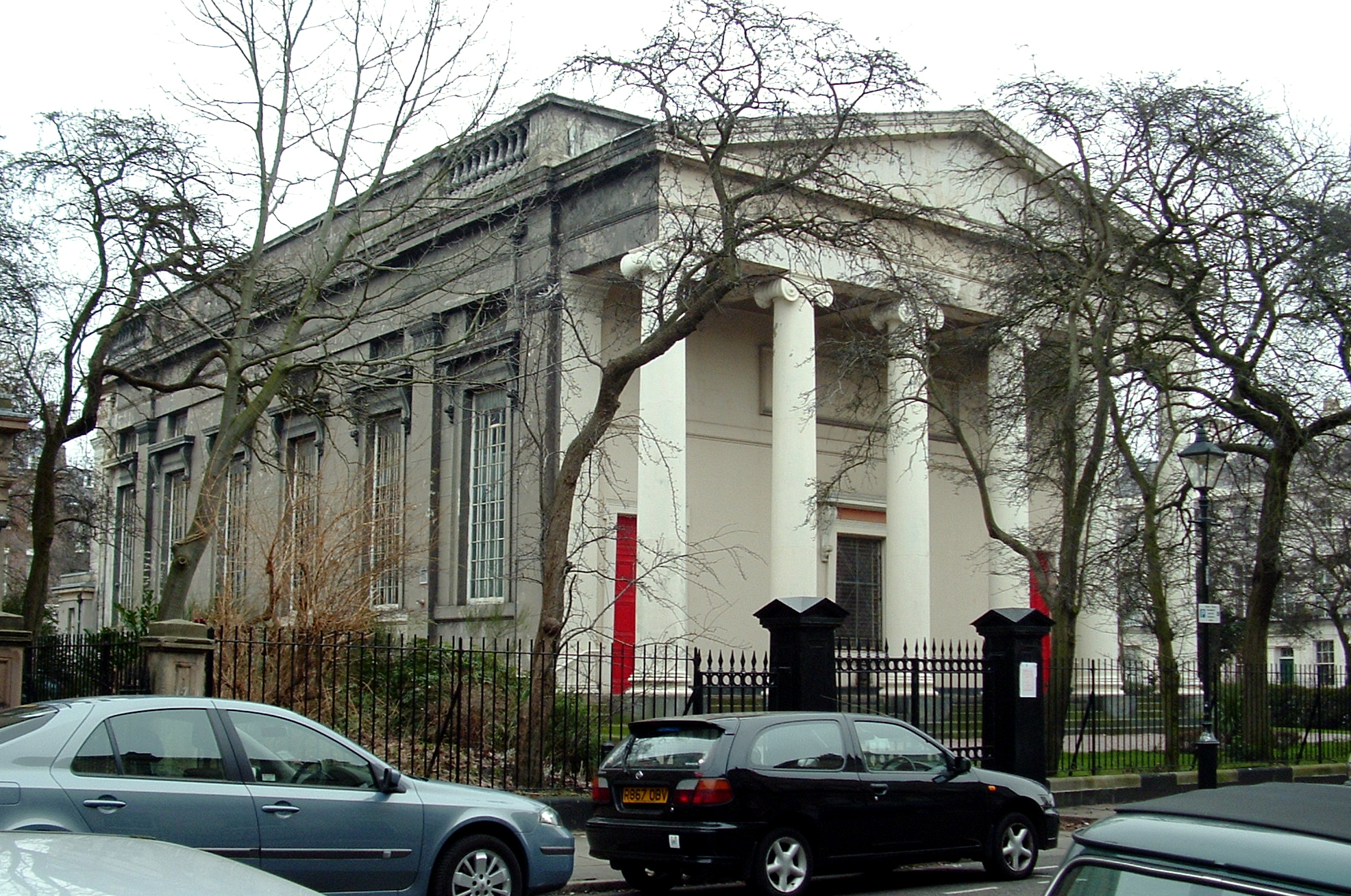
St. Bride's Church, Percy Street
Georgian Quarter
(1830; Grade II*)

== Victorian (1837–1901) ==
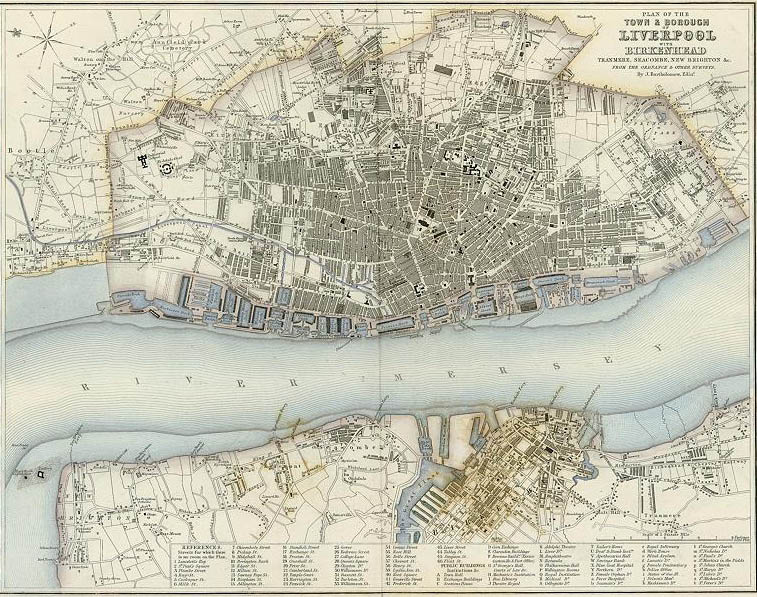
Map of Liverpool in 1866

Liverpool continued to grow throughout the Victorian period from a population of 165,000 in 1831 to 685,000 by 1901. This meant a growing demand for housing and other buildings. After the opening of the Liverpool to Manchester Railway, other railway links to Liverpool were made, the Grand Junction Railway gave access to Birmingham and London in 1837; Chester and Birkenhead Railway (1840) then to Liverpool via Steam Ferry operational since 1815; Lancashire and Yorkshire Railway (1847) and Cheshire Lines Committee (1873). In 1880 Liverpool was granted city status.

"Among the great cities of the world.... there is no other so exclusively devoted to commerce. Every house in Liverpool is either a counting-house, a warehouse, a shop, or a house that in one way or another is either an instrument or the result of trade.....and the inhabitants are nearly all to a man traders or the servants of traders" Johann Georg Kohl 1844, in The British Isles and Their Inhabitants

=== Victorian docks and warehouses ===
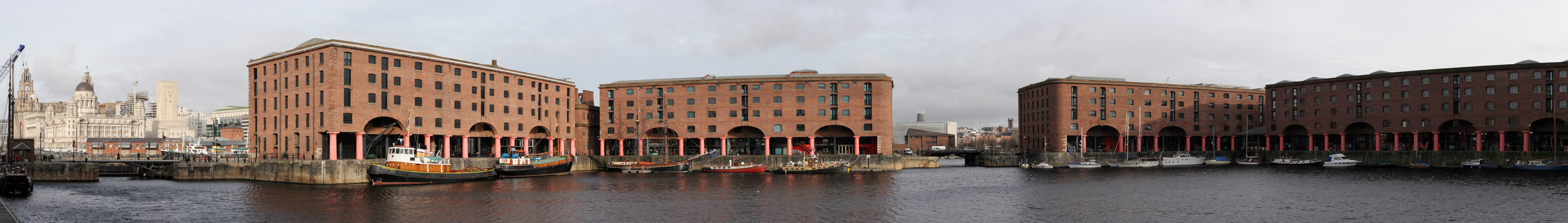
Industrial Dock Architecture at the Albert Dock (1841–47; Grade I)

The docks are central to Liverpool's history, eventually, they would stretch seven miles along the Mersey and at their widest be 0.5 miles deep. Traffic into the docks went from 4.7 million tons in 1865 to 12.4 million by 1900. The docks created during this period are: under Jesse Hartley Dock Engineer (1824–60): Coburg Dock, completed 1840; Toxteth Dock, opened 1841, extensively extended and reopened 1888; Canning Half Tide Dock, opened 1844; Harrington Dock, opened 1844; The Albert Dock, completed 1847; Collingwood Dock, opened 1848; Salisbury Dock, opened 1848; Stanley Dock opened 1848; Nelson Dock, opened 1848; Bramley-Moore Dock, opened 1848 linked to the Lancashire and Yorkshire Railway and used for coal export; Wellington Dock, opened 1851; Sandon Half Tide Dock, opened 1851; Sandon Dock, opened 1851; Wapping Dock, completed 1852; Huskisson Dock, opened 1852; Canada Dock, opened 1859; under George Fosbery Lyster Dock Engineer (1861–97): Carriers' Dock, opened 1862; Brocklebank Dock, opened 1862; Herculaneum Dock, opened 1866; Langton Dock, opened 1881; Alexandra Dock, opened 1881; Hornby Dock, opened 1884.

William Allingham writing in 1870 described Liverpool's trade:

"Hither converge in ceaseless streams the cotton of America, India, Egypt, the wool of Australian plains, the elephants' tusks and palm oil of African forests, the spermaceti of Arctic seas, the grain from the shores of the Mississippi, St Lawrence, Elbe, Loire, Danube, Vistula and many another stream, the hides of South America, the sugar, copper, tobacco, rice, timber, guano & c., of every land the sun's eye look upon. Hence radiate to all quarters of the globe, bales of cotton goods, linen, wollen, bulks of machinery. inexhaustible leather and hardware, salt and soap, coals and iron, copper and tin"

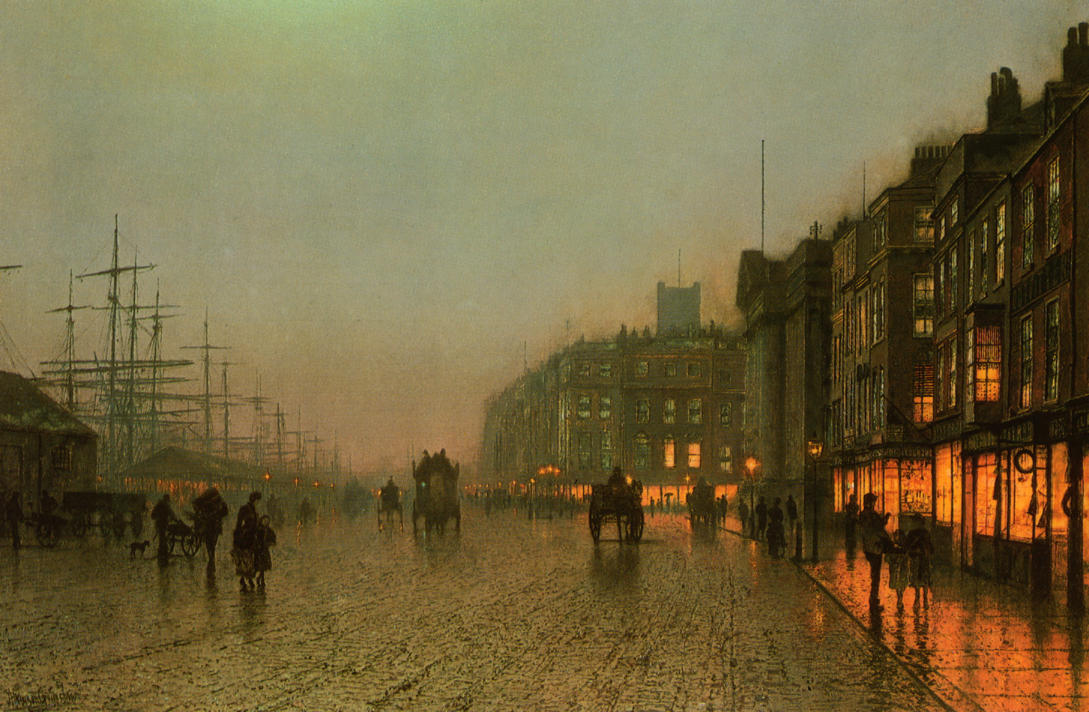
Quay at Wapping Dock looking north, 1875, by John Atkinson Grimshaw, none of the buildings depicted survive, visible centre right is one of the porticoes of the Custom House

Despite being the main target of the Liverpool Blitz several Victorian dock buildings survived. With the best-known being the Albert Dock (1841–47). Designed by Jesse Hartley and constructed in cast iron, brick and stone, it provides the first enclosed, non-combustible dock warehouse system in the world. Restored in the 1980s, the Albert Dock has the largest collection of Grade I listed buildings in Britain. Part of the old dock complex is now the home to the Merseyside Maritime Museum (an Anchor Point of ERIH, The European Route of Industrial Heritage), the International Slavery Museum and the Tate Liverpool. Other relics of the dock system include Victoria Tower and the warehouse at the north side of Stanley Dock, and the warehouse at Wapping Dock all three by Hartley. The Waterloo Grain Warehouse (1867) by George Fosbery Lyster at Waterloo Dock, who also designed the casemates (1881–82) at Herculaneum Dock, used to store Petroleum and the Stanley Dock Tobacco Warehouse designed by Anthony George Lyster, which at the time of its construction in 1901, was the world's largest building in terms of floor area, and is still the world's largest brickwork building. Other remains of the Victorian dock system are the tower (1889–90) that worked hydraulic machinery for Toxteth Dock survives, now known as Bradbury House, The Pilotage Building (1883) next to Canning Half Tide Dock was probably designed by John Arthur Berrington. The Warehouse at 45–51 Greenland Street (late 19th century) is a survivor of a warehouse not part of the docks, another warehouse just outside the docks is the large Clarence Warehouse probably designed by A.H. Holme.

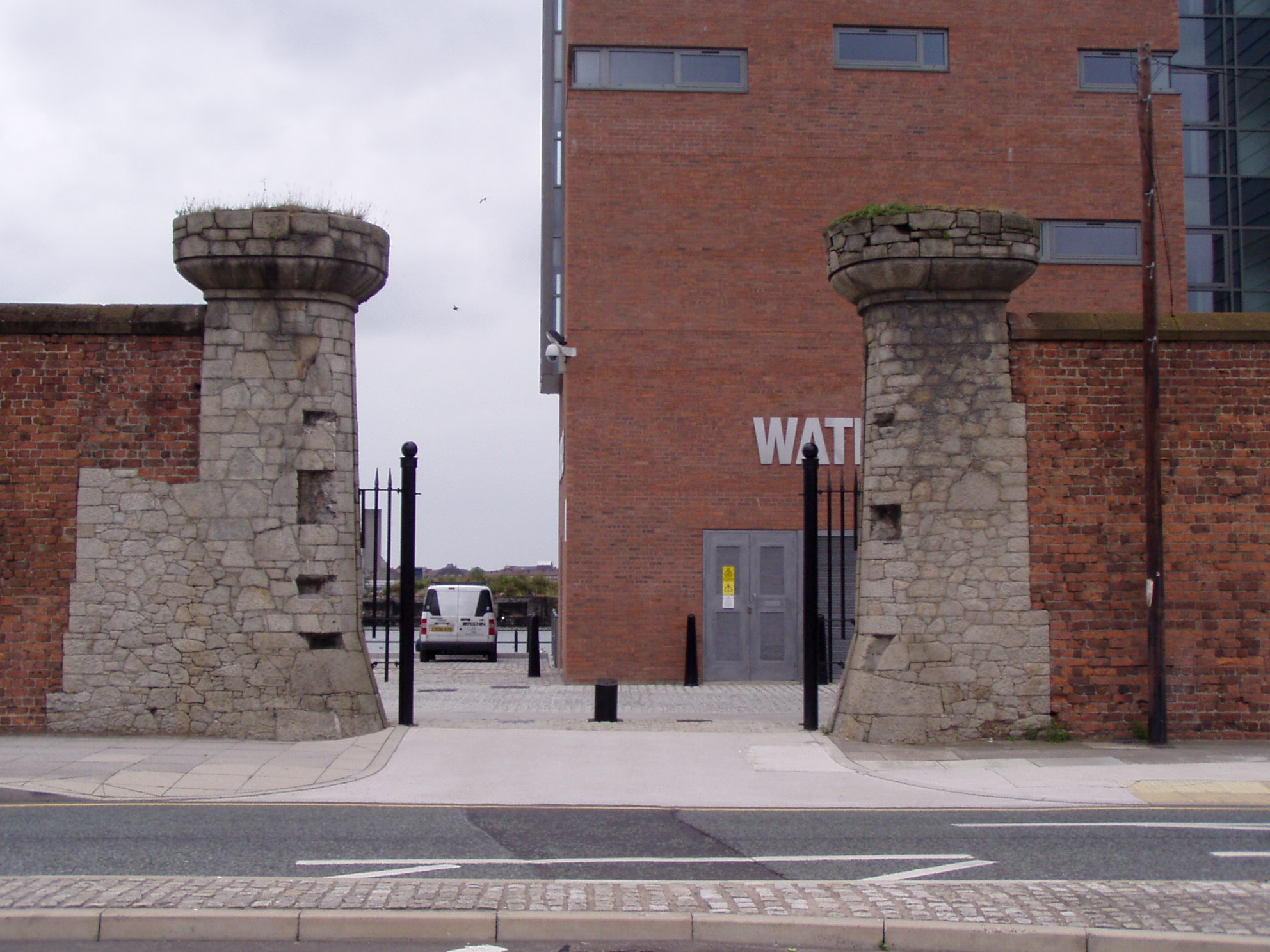
Waterloo Dock Gate Piers, by Hartley
(1830s; Grade II)

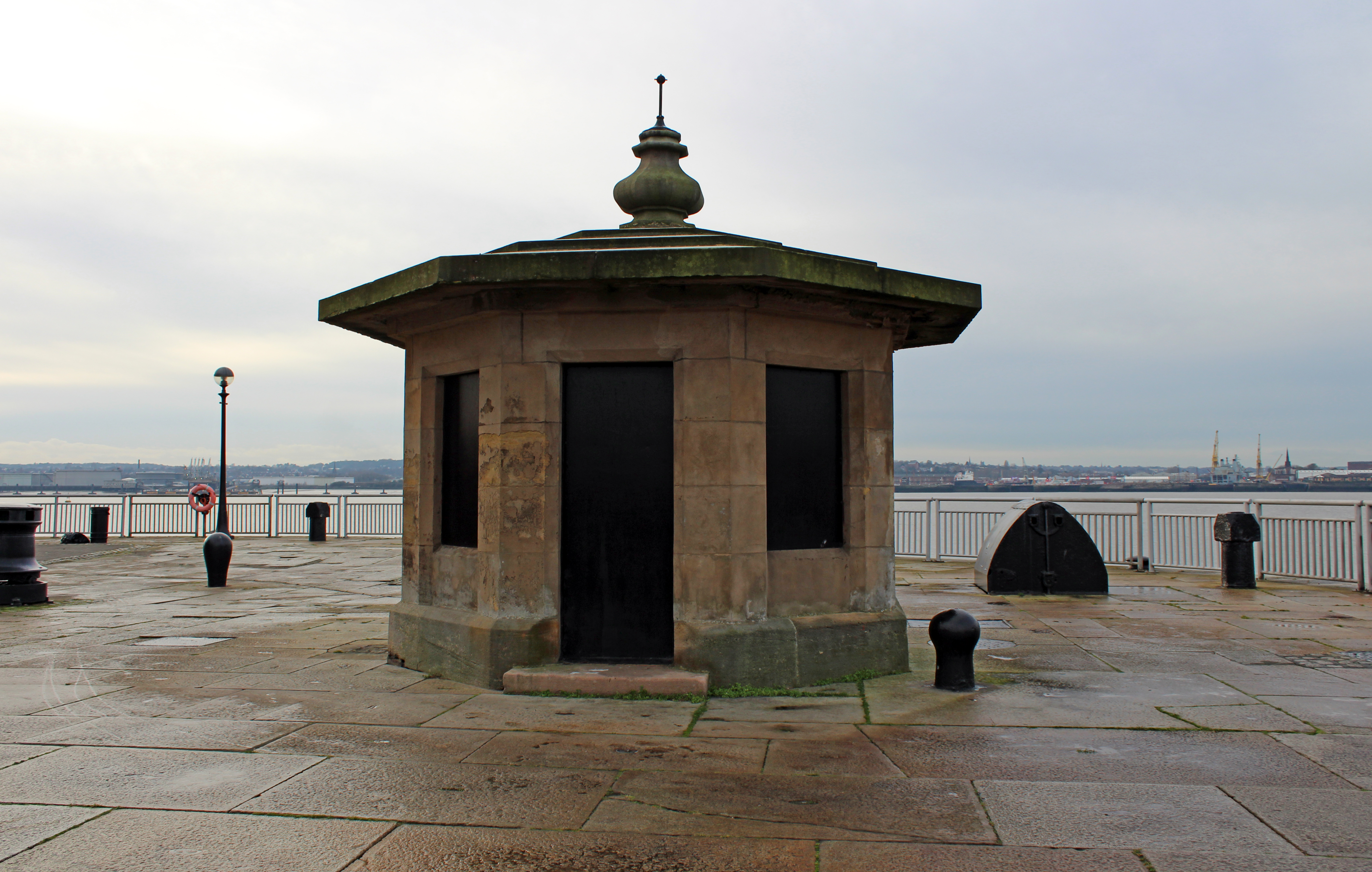
The southern of the two gatekeeper's huts, Brunswick Half Tide Dock
(c.1832; Grade II)

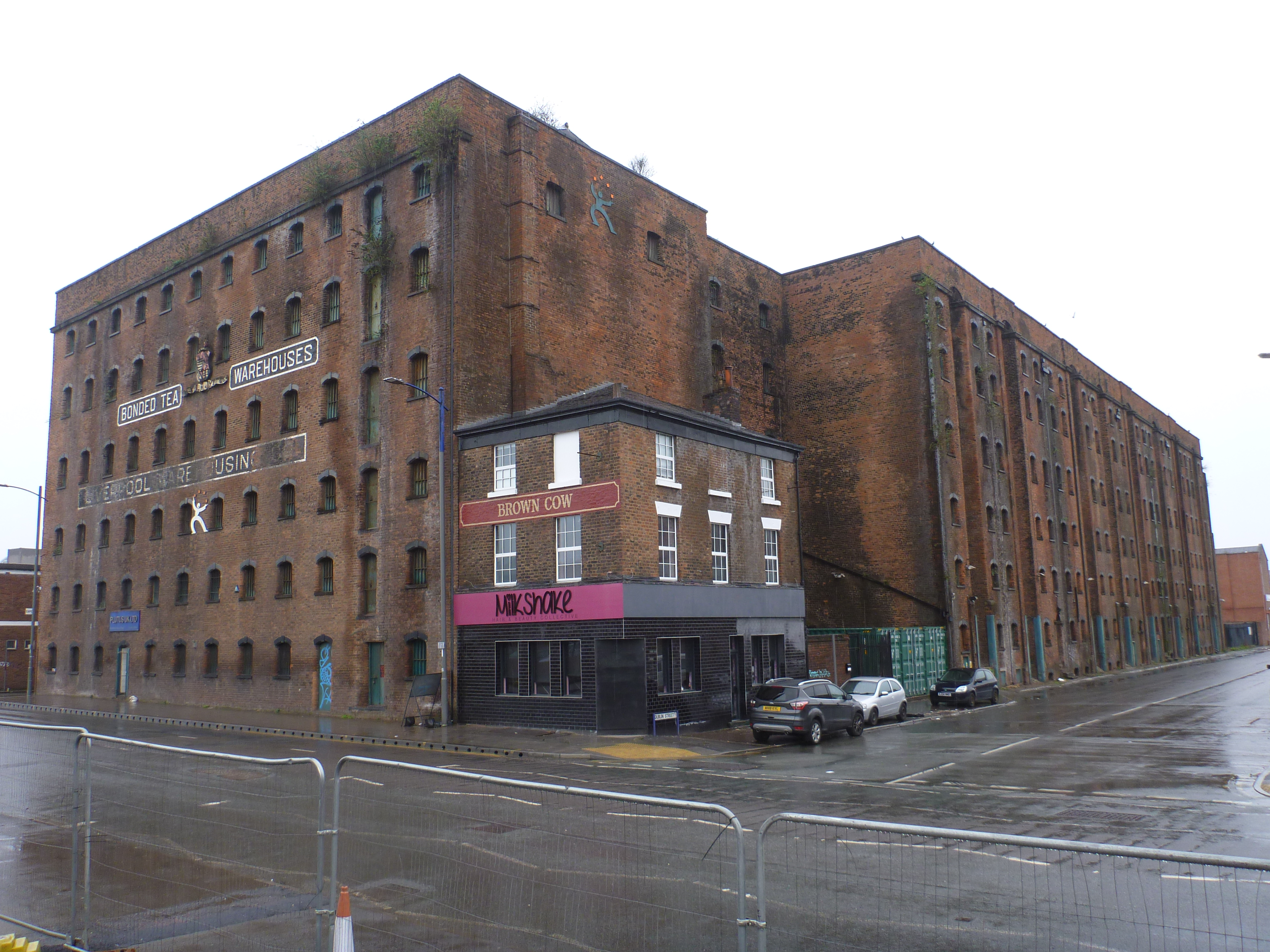
Clarence Warehouse, (Bonded Tea Warehouse), Great Howard Street
(1840s; Grade II)

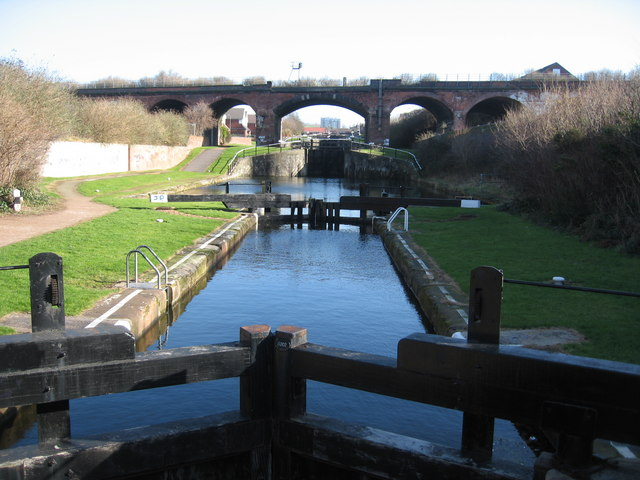
Last lock on Leeds and Liverpool Canal, links canal to Stanley Dock
(1840s; Grade II)

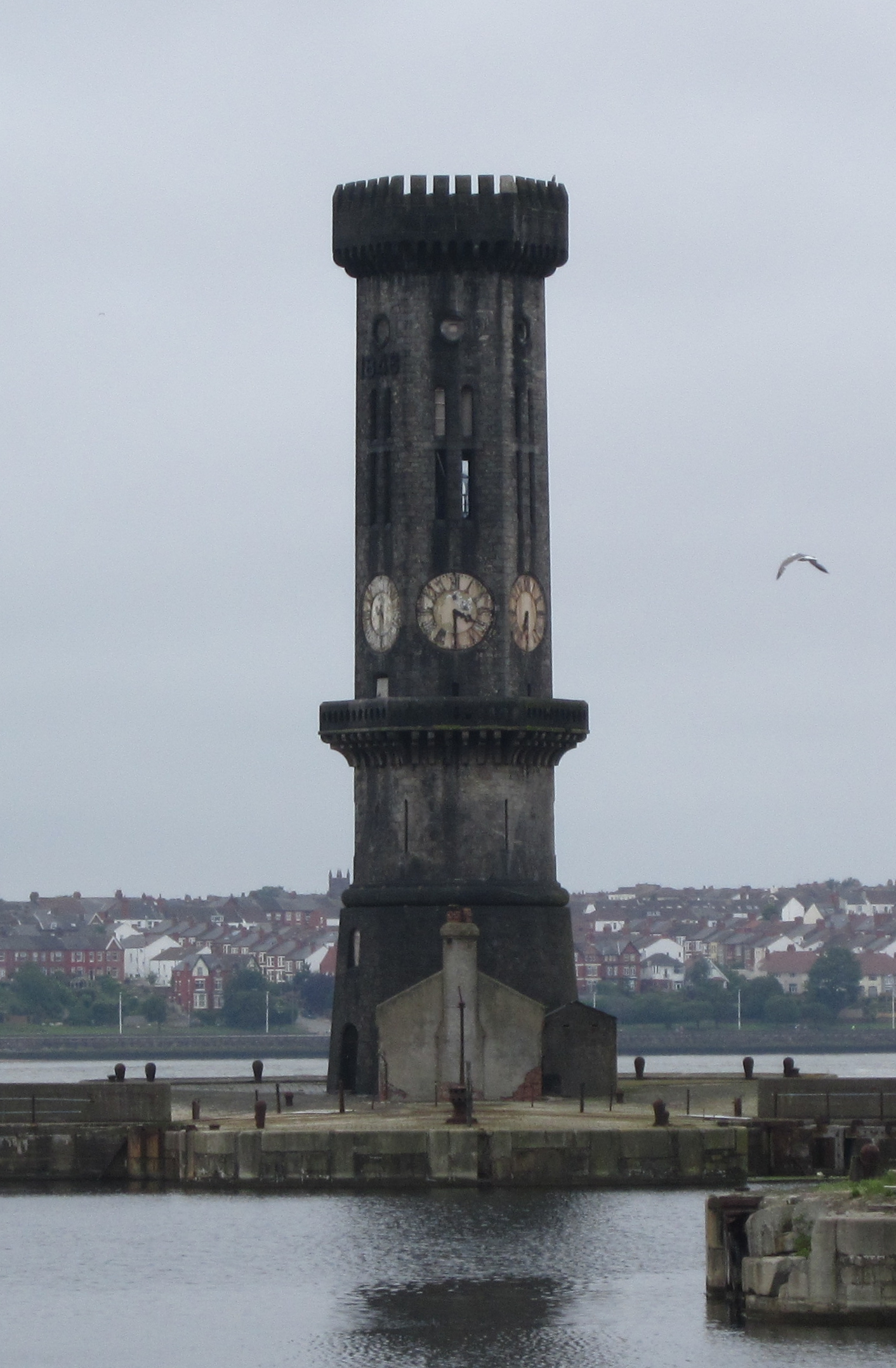
Victoria Tower, Collingwood Dock
(1848; Grade II)

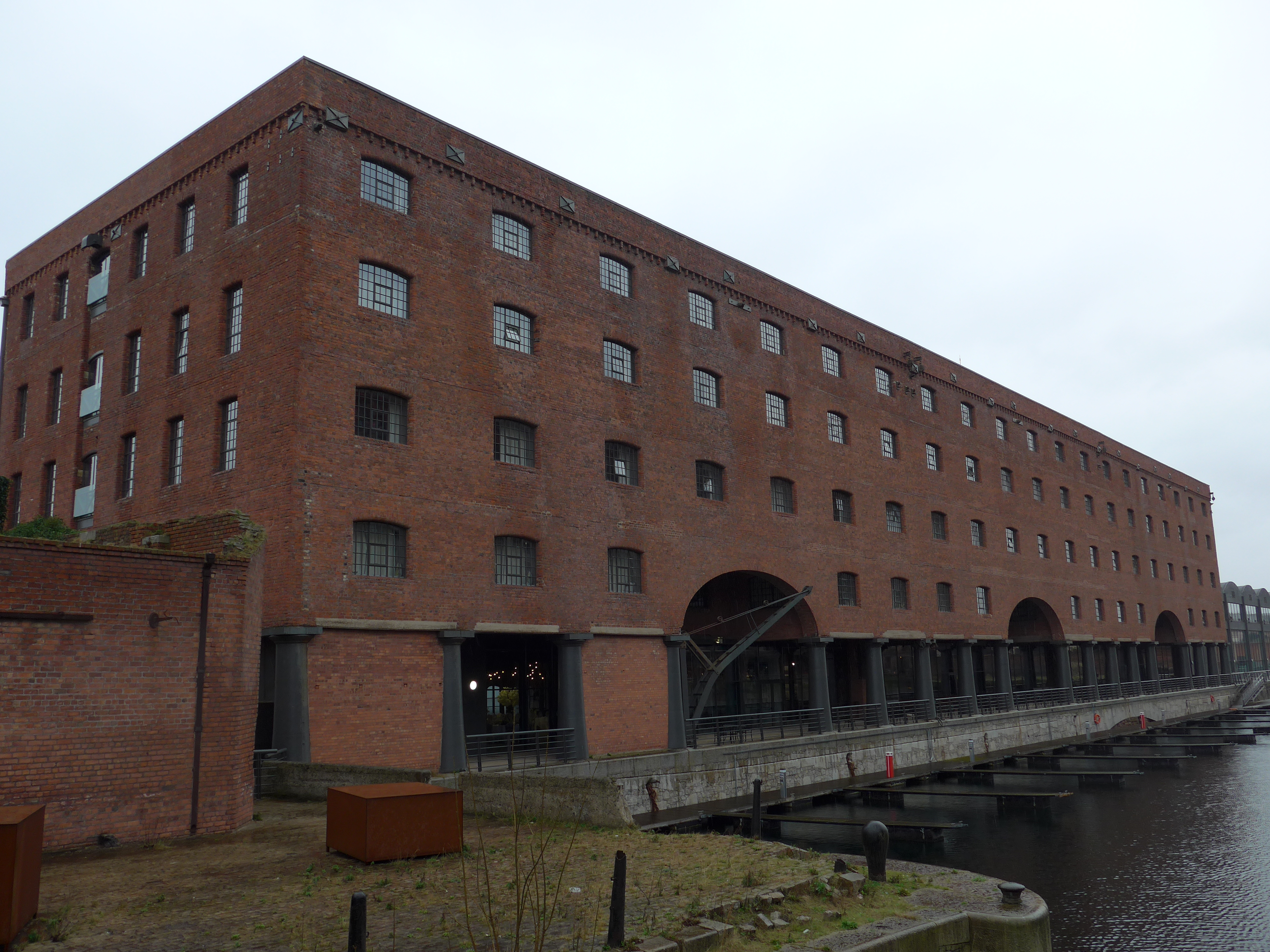
North warehouse, Stanley Dock
(1852–54; Grade II*)

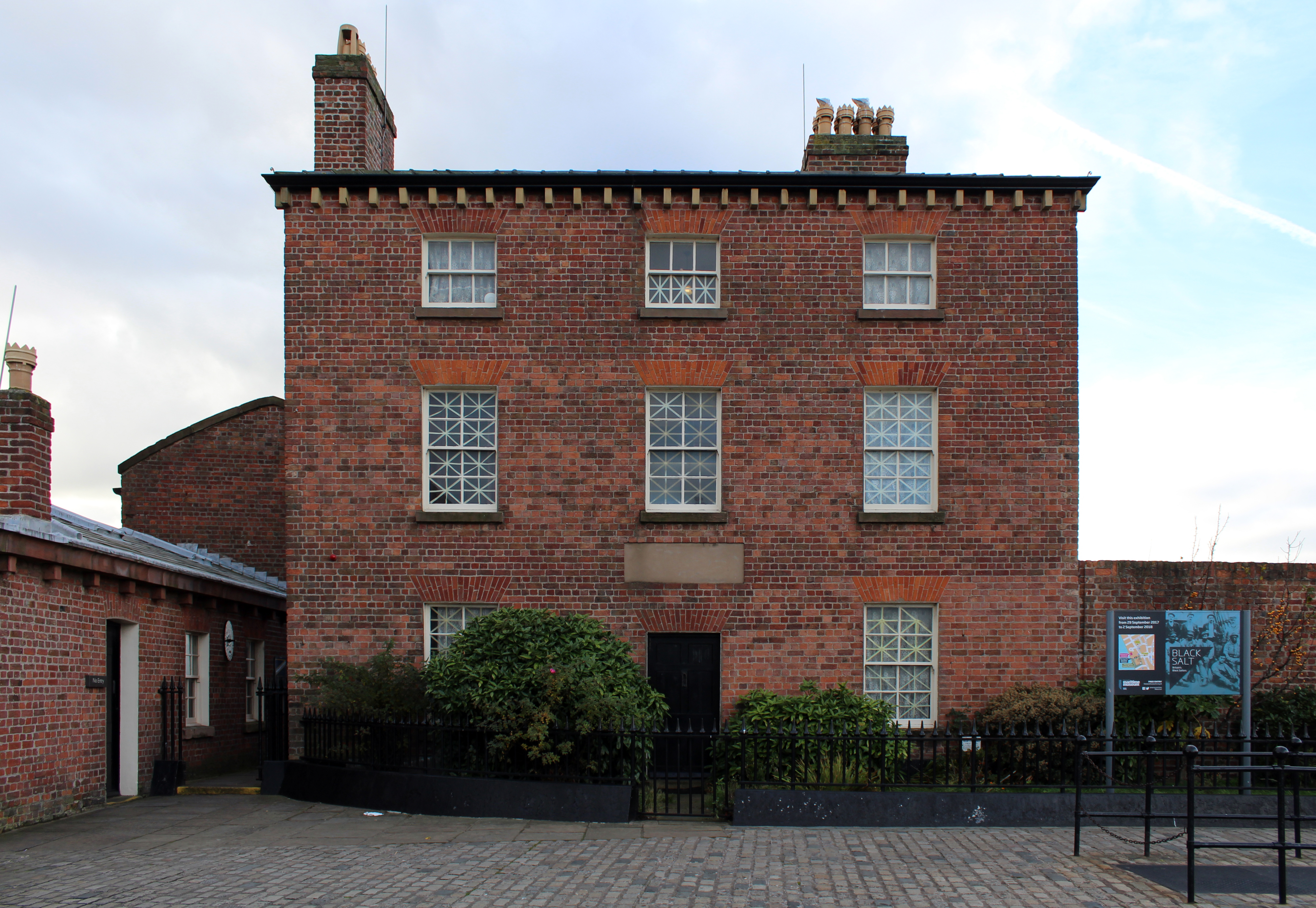
Piermaster's House, Albert Dock
(1852–53; Grade II)

=== Victorian bank & office buildings ===
At the heart of 19th century, Liverpool was Commerce, the docks being second only to the Port of London, and provision was needed for housing Banks to finance enterprises, Insurance companies and businesses involved in trade and shipping, these activities were based in the centre of the city and were housed in grand buildings. Victorian banks and office buildings are particularly concentrated in Dale Street and Castle Street. Lawyers and accountants favoured Cook Street, Harrington Street, North and South John Street for their offices. An improvement act in 1826 by the Corporation of Liverpool, oversaw the creation of a new street, St George's Crescent in central Liverpool and the widening Lord Street and North and South John Streets. Victoria Street was created in 1868, and most of its fine Victorian buildings survive. Exchange Flags behind the Town Hall was the centre of the cotton trade, cotton traders were based in the surrounding streets, surviving offices used by cotton traders include the Albany Building in Old Hall Street, Berey's Buildings, Bixteth Street and Mason's Building in Exchange Street East, in 1896 cotton trading moved indoors to Brown's Buildings were the former Martin Bank Headquarters is now. Liverpool's first Corn exchange opened in 1808 in Brunswick Street, designed by John Foster Sr., it was rebuilt on the same site in 1853–64 to designs by J.A. Picton but was destroyed in World War II bombing, Corn Merchants' offices were in the immediate area, but have largely been demolished. Shipping companies were generally located near the waterfront and the docks, the major surviving shipping company buildings are Mersey House and Albion House. Starting in the 1840s Palazzo style architecture became popular for Banking and Office Buildings. The trading cities of Renaissance Italy having appeal to Liverpool's merchants, especially Venice the once-great maritime trading city.

==== Victorian banks ====
The bank buildings of most architectural interest are: The Royal Bank, 18 Queen Avenue, off Dale Street, by Samuel Rowland; North & South Wales Bank (1838–40) (Now Castle Moat House), Derby Square, by Edward Corbett (See Neoclassical above for Illustration); Bank of England (1846–48), Castle Street, by Charles Robert Cockerell; The former headquarters of the Liverpool Savings Bank (1861) by William Culshaw; The Alliance Bank (1868), 62 Castle Street, by Lucy & Littler; Liverpool Union Bank (c.1870), now Halifax House, Brunswick Street, probably by John Cunningham, extended by George Enoch Grayson; Former Bank of Liverpool (1882), Victoria Street by George Enoch Grayson; Former Union Bank of Liverpool (1885), 43 to 47 Bold Street, by George Enoch Grayson; Adelphi Bank (c.1891–92), Castle Street, by W. D. Caröe; Leyland & Bullin's Bank; 36 Castle Street, former Leyland and Bullens Bank (1895), by Grayson and Ould; Parr's Bank (Now Nat West Bank) (1898–1901), Castle Street, by Richard Norman Shaw, execution overseen by Willink & Thicknesse.

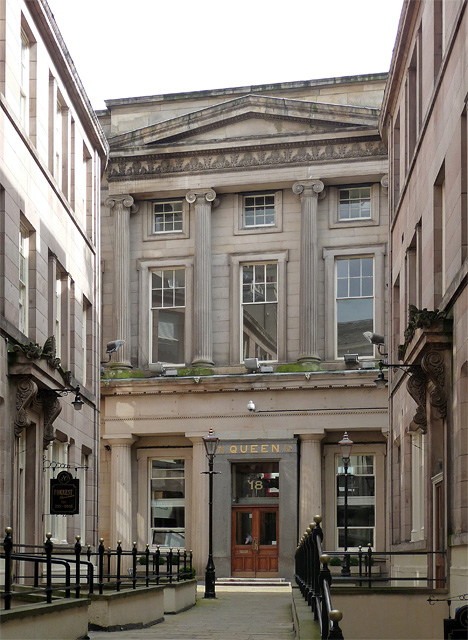
Former The Royal Bank, 18 Queen Avenue, off Dale Street
(c.1837-38; Grade II*)

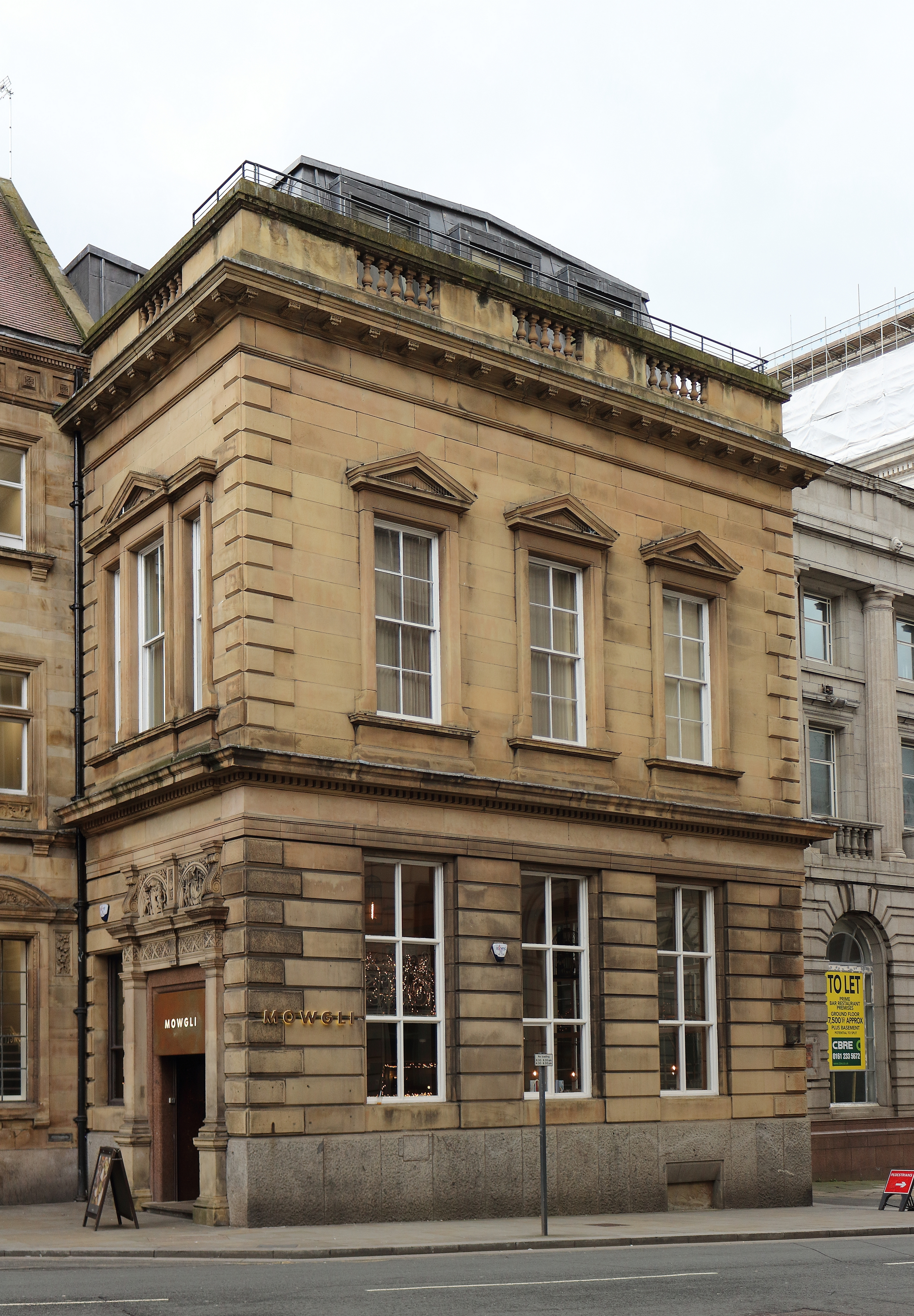
Former Manchester and Liverpool District Bank, 3 Water Street
(1860s; altered 1883 Grade II)

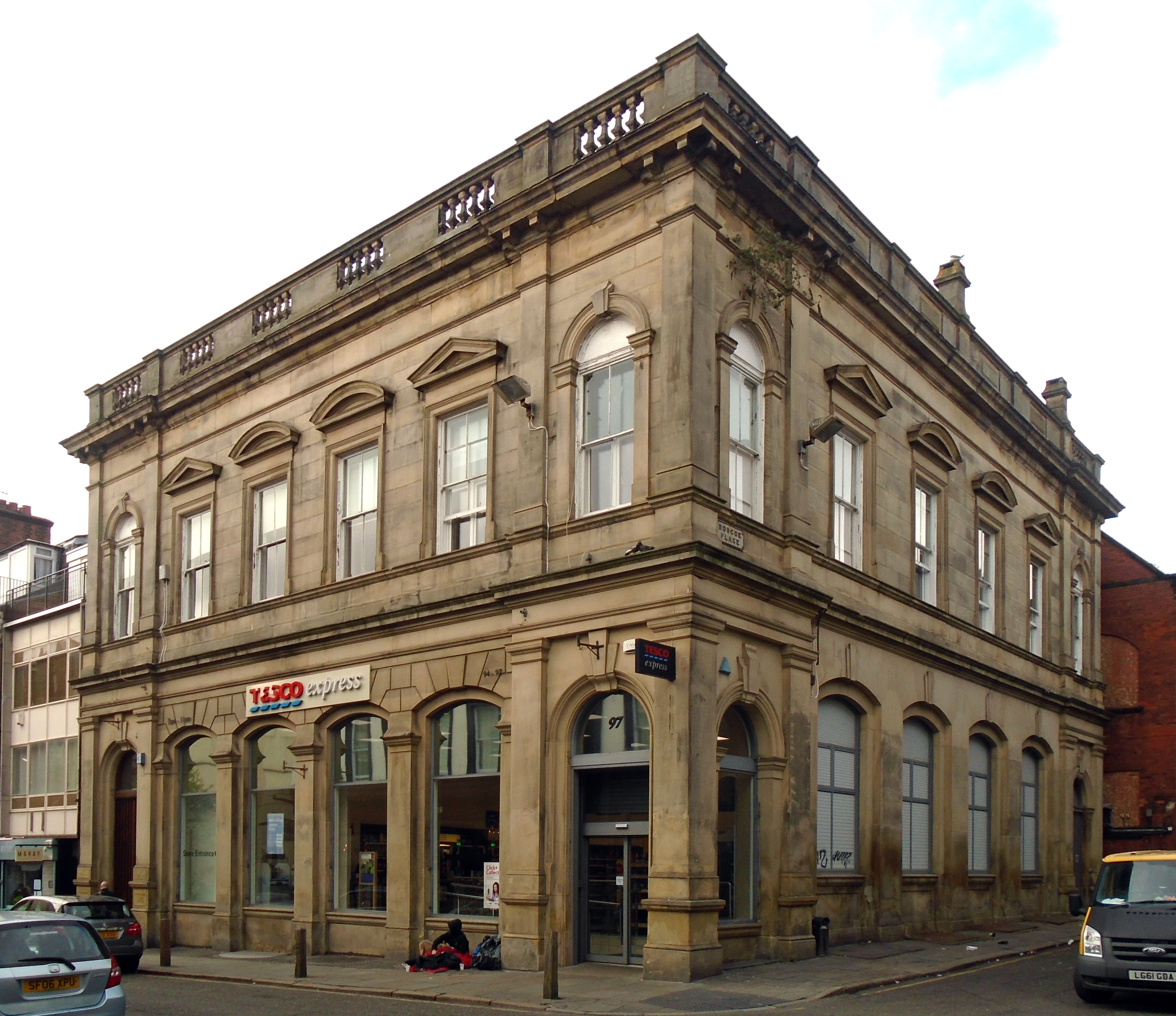
Former Liverpool Savings Bank, Bold Street
(1861; unlisted)

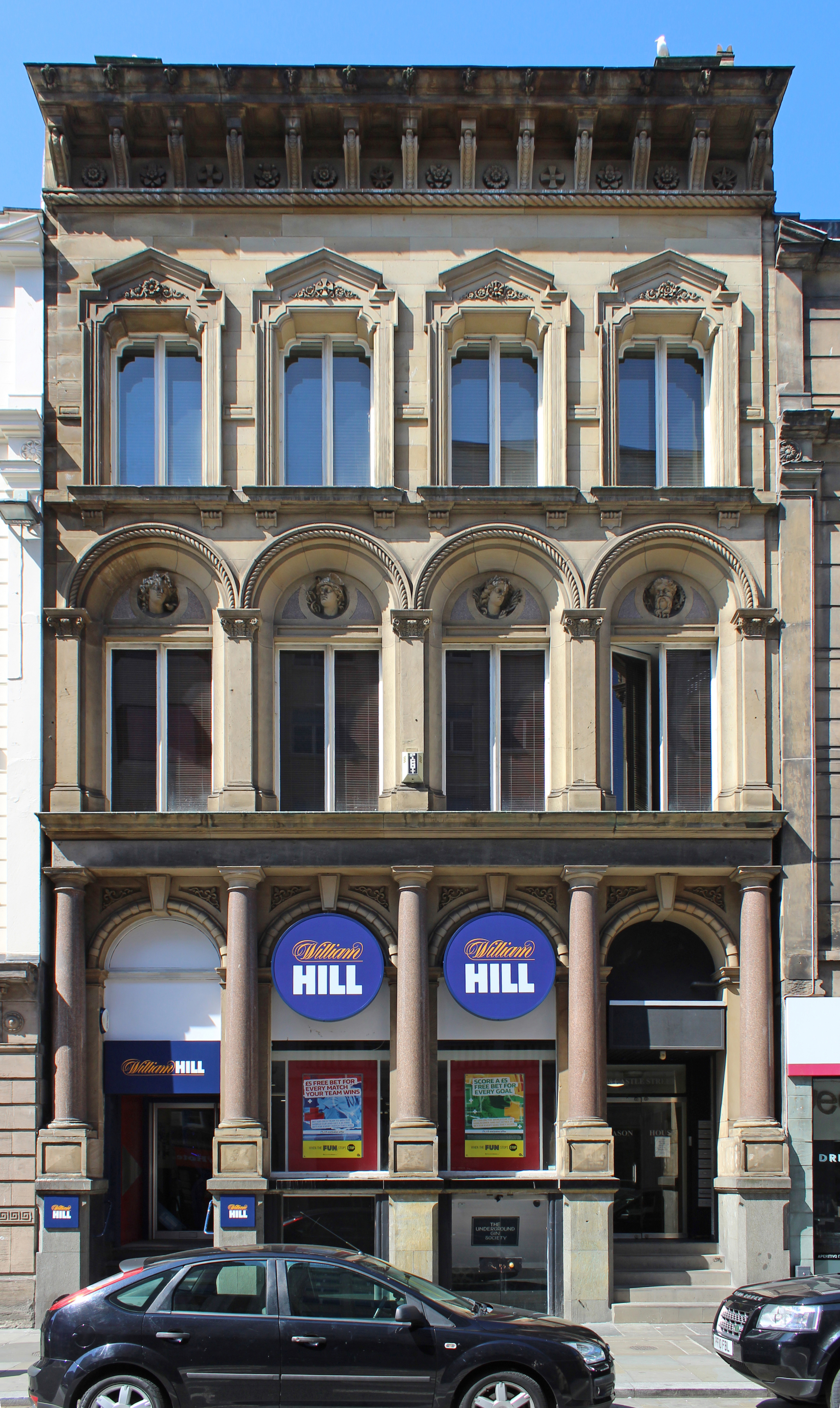
Former Mercantile and Exchange Bank, 48-50 Castle Street
(1864; Grade II)

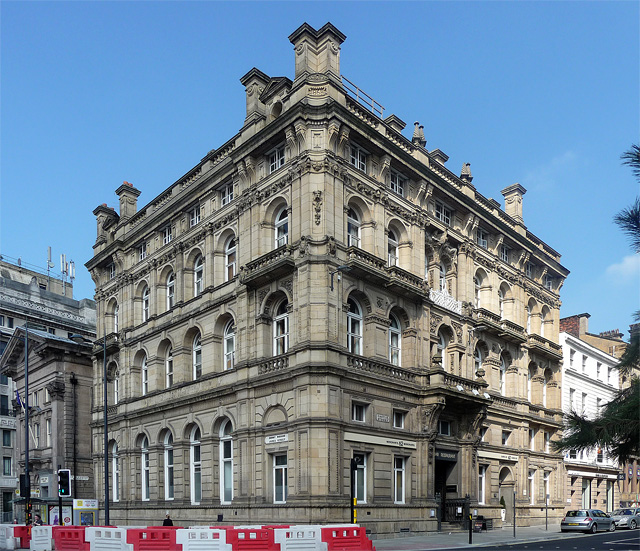
Former Alliance Bank, 60-62 Castle Street
(1868; Grade II)

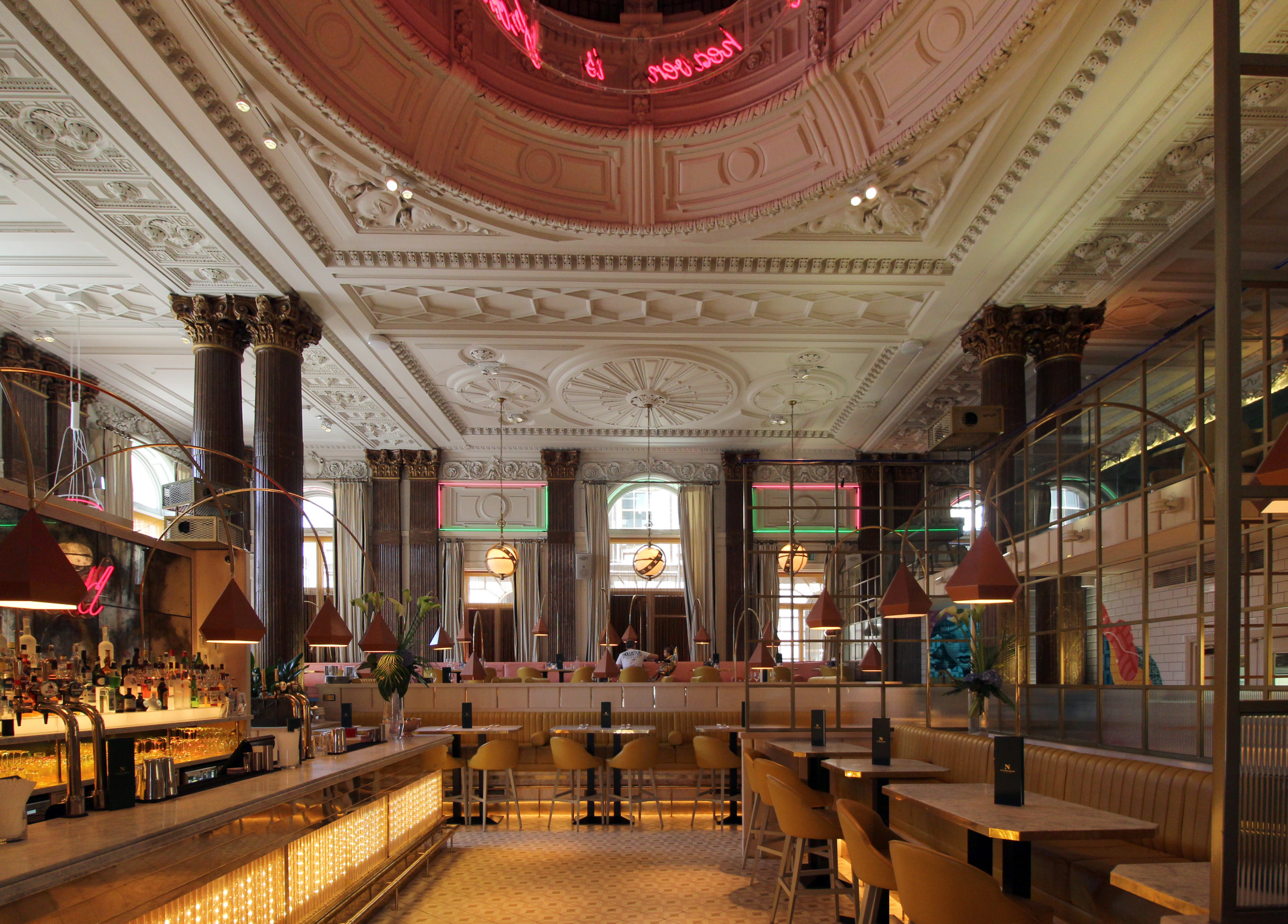
Interior, former Alliance Bank
(1868; Grade II)

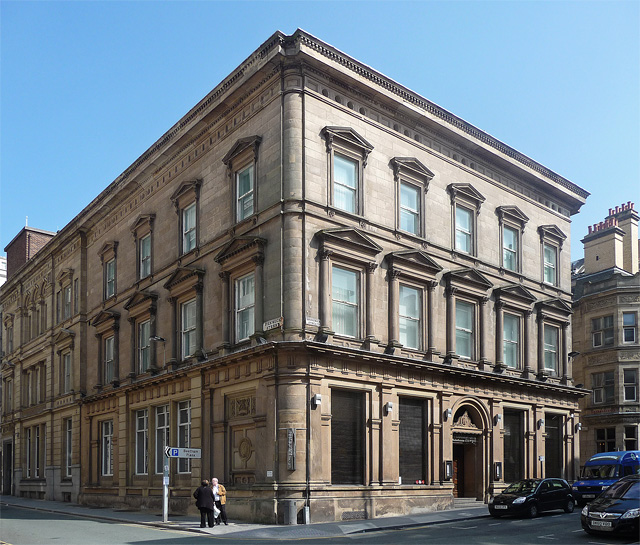
Former Liverpool Union Bank, now Halifax House, 6 Brunswick Street
(c.1870; Grade II)

==== Victorian purpose built offices for insurance & other enterprises ====
Buildings erected by insurance companies include: the Headquarters of the Liverpool, London and Globe Building (1856–58) by Charles Robert Cockerell; The Queen Insurance Building (1859) also for the Queen Insurance Company 13 Castle Street; 19 Castle Street was the Scottish Equitable Chambers by George Enoch Grayson; former Scottish Provident Building (1874), 25 Castle Street; 3–5 Castle Street was the British & Foreign Marine Insurance by Grayson & Ould; former Guardian Assurance Building (1893), Dale Street, probably by Grayson & Ould; Albion House (1895–98), former headquarters of the White Star Line, designed by Richard Norman Shaw & James Francis Doyle. For both the Prudential Assurance Building and Pearl Assurance Building see the section on Alfred Waterhouse. Mersey Chambers (c.1878) was designed by G.E. Grayson as the headquarters of the shipping company Thomas and James Harrison. 27 Castle Street (1846), built for the lawyer Ambrose Lace by Arthur Hill Holme. The growth in trade with America resulted in the building of Fowler's Buildings (1865–69), Victoria Street, by James Picton, Fowler's were an American company who imported produce from America.

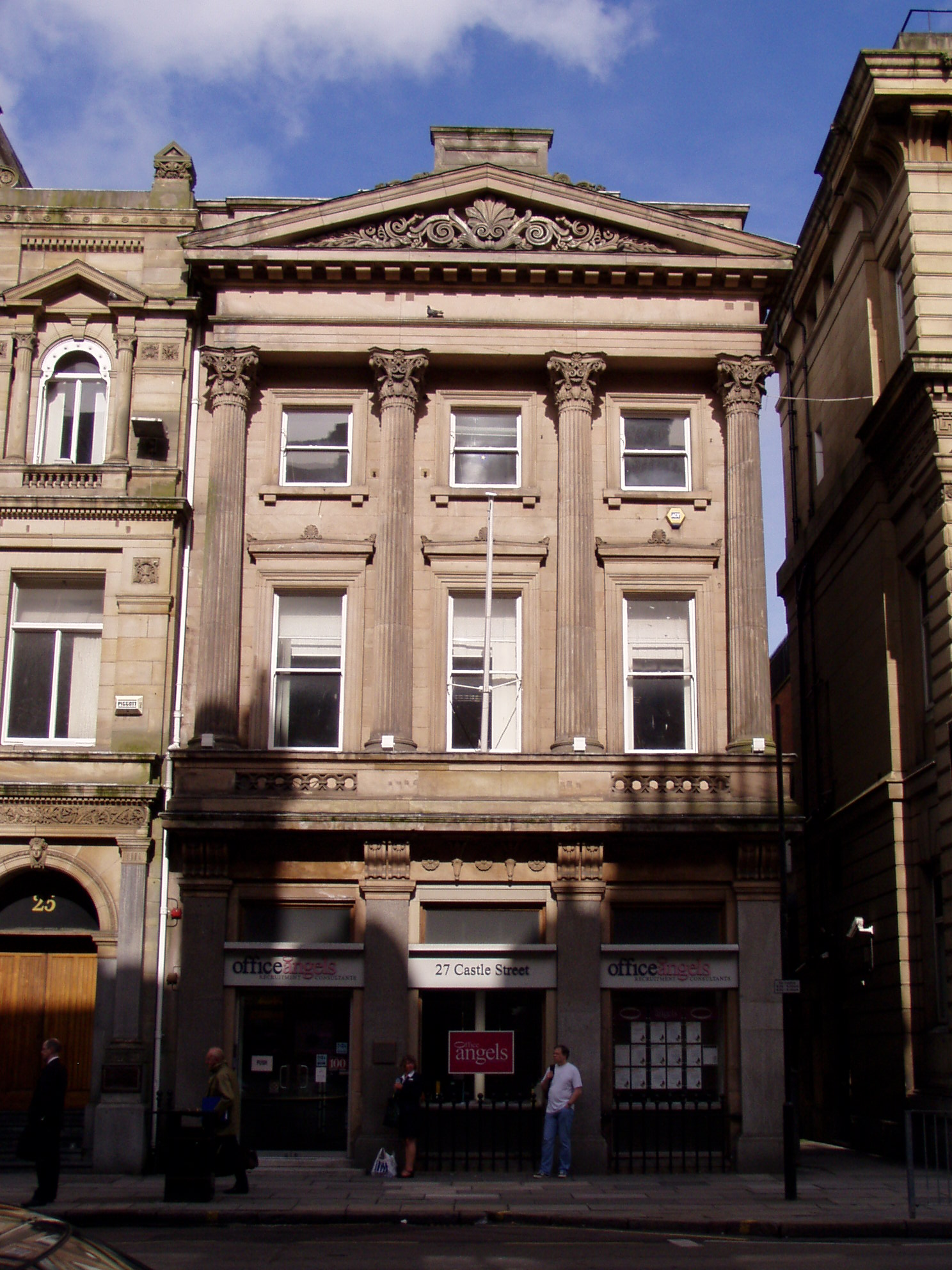
27 Castle Street
(1846; Grade II)

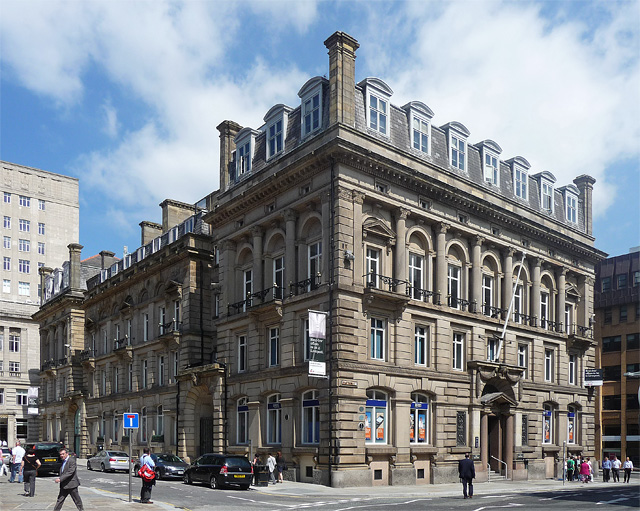
Liverpool, London and Globe Building, 1 Dale Street
(1858; Grade II)

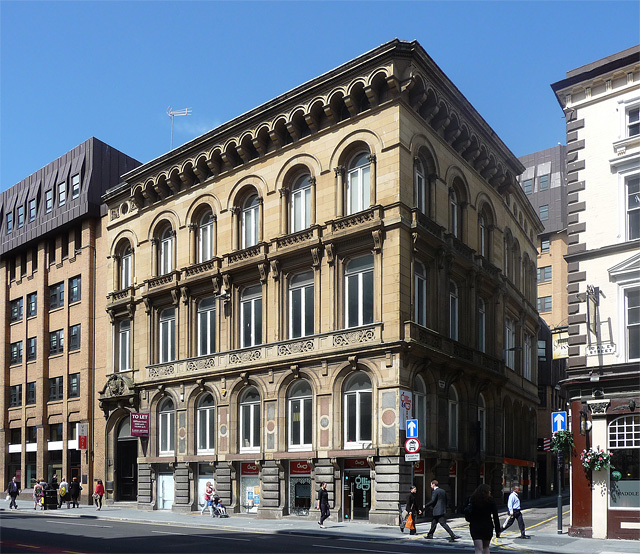
Queen Insurance Company, 11 Dale Street
(1859; Grade II)

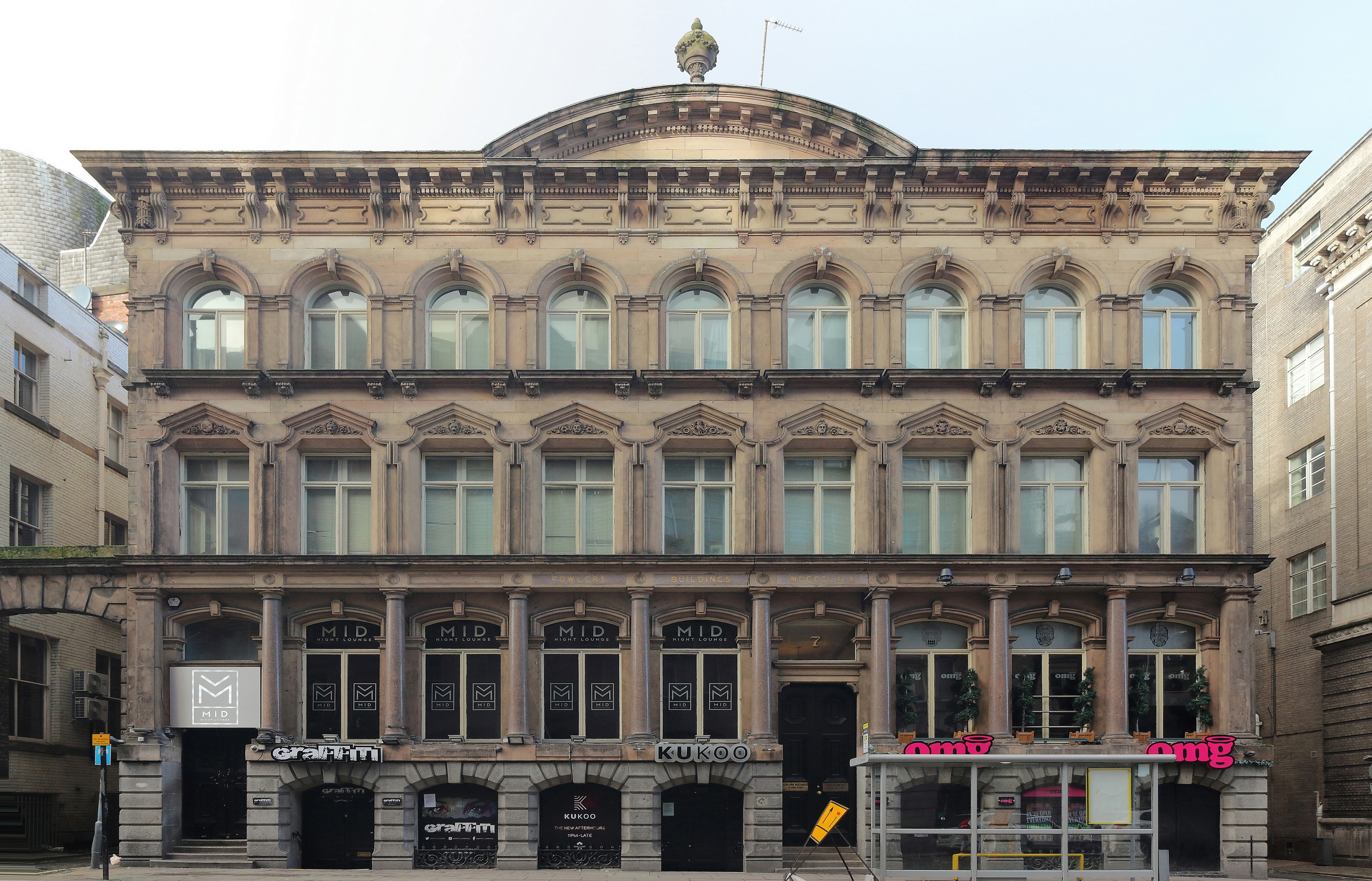
Fowler's Building, Victoria Street
(1865–69; Grade II*)

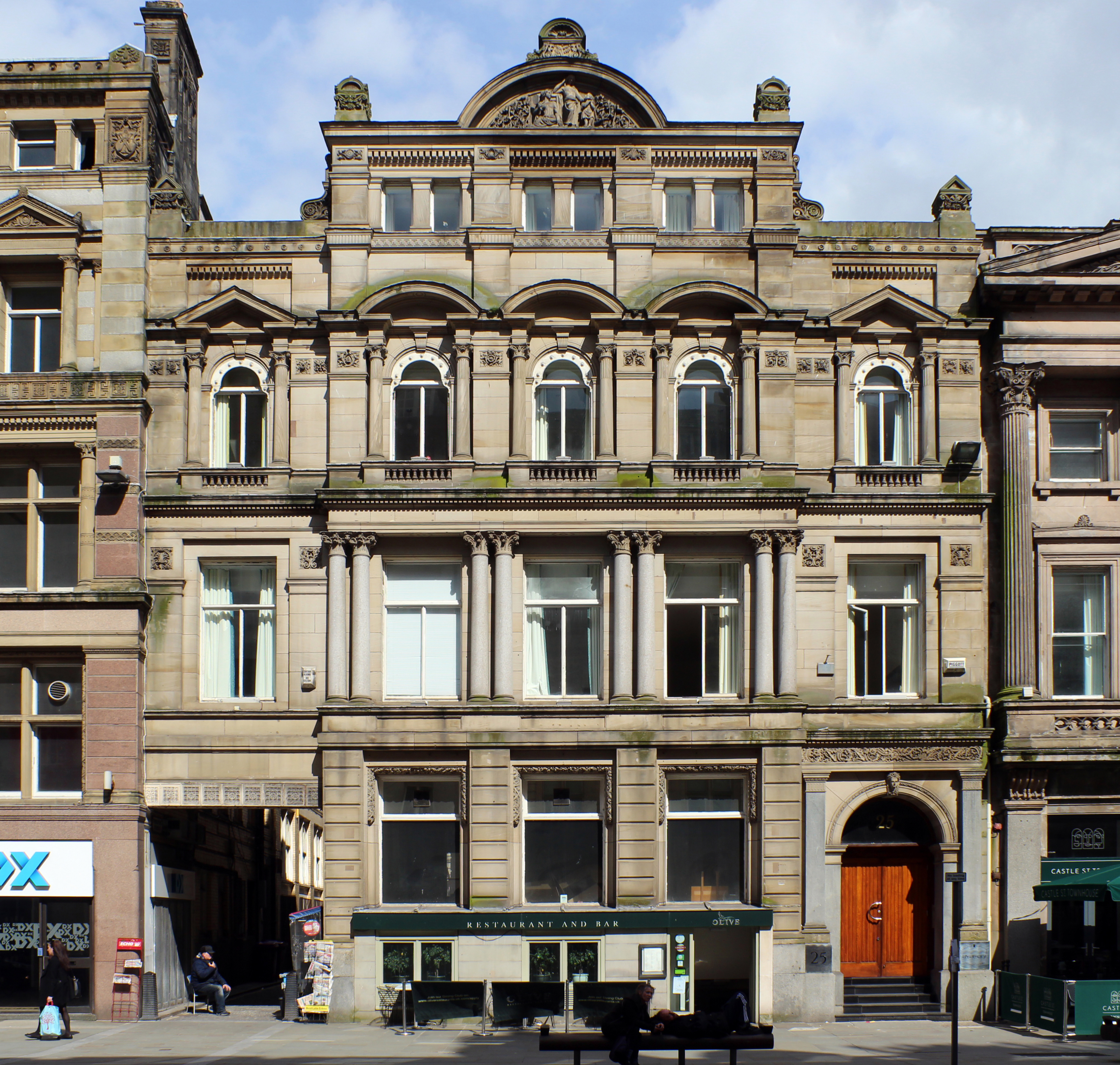
Former Scottish Provident Building, 25 Castle Street
(1874; Grade II)

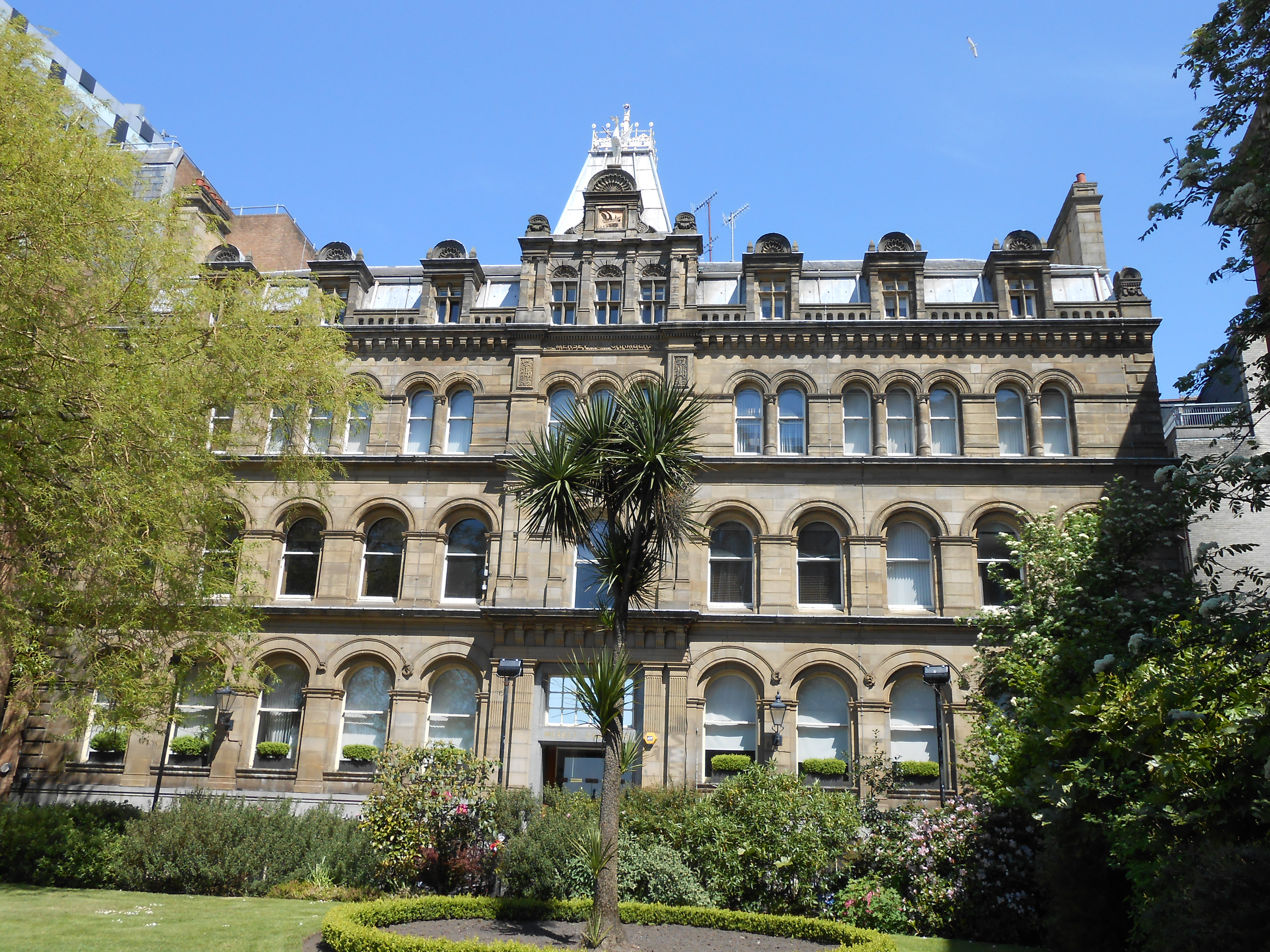
Mersey Chambers, Old Church Yard
(c.1878; Grade II)

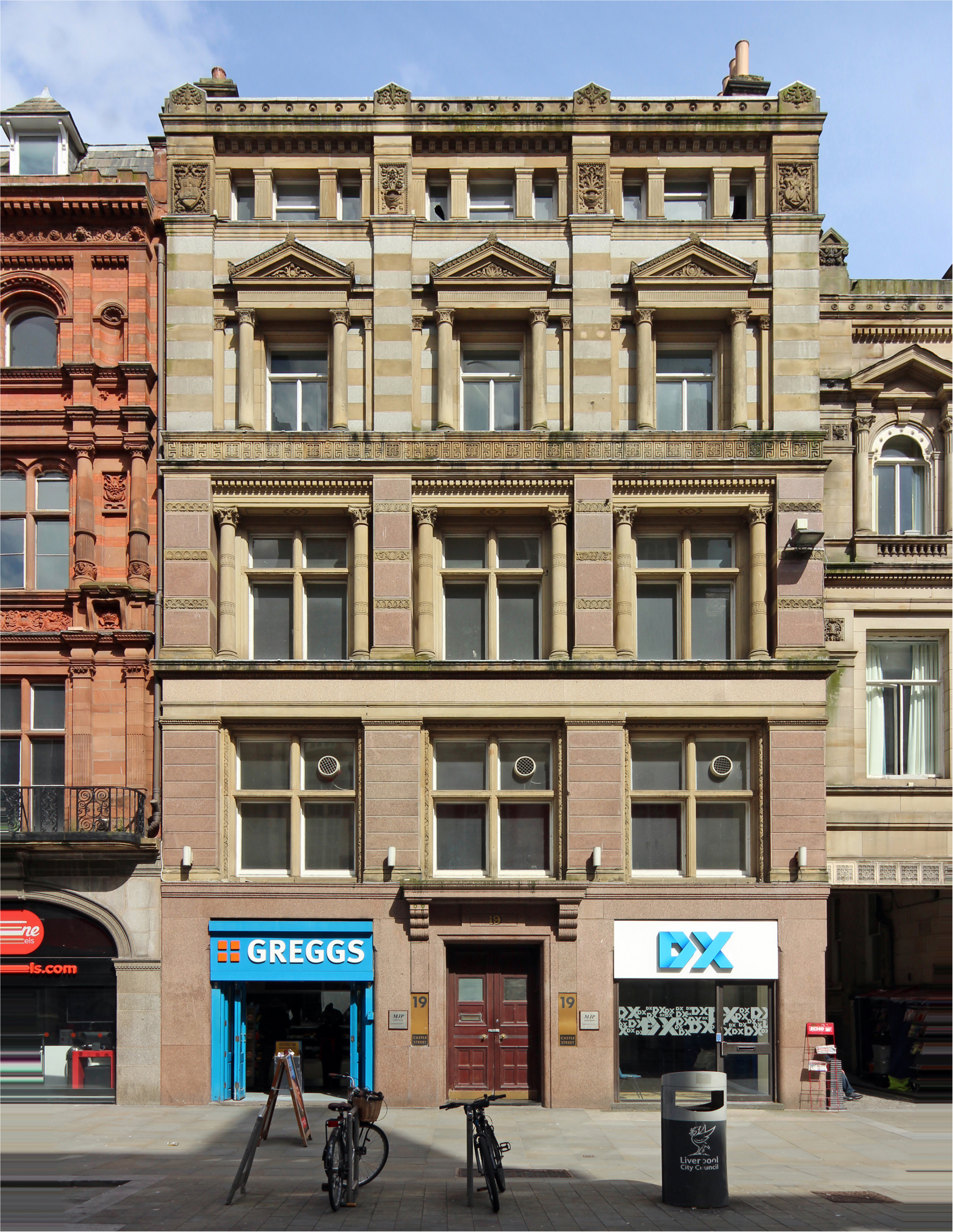
Former Scottish Equitable Chambers, 19 Castle Street
(1878; Grade II)

==== Victorian speculative office buildings ====
Office buildings erected speculatively include: The Royal Bank Building (c.1837–38), Dale Street, by Samuel Rowland, the bank (see above) occupied the building in the court to the rear and let the building; The Temple (1864–65), Dale Street by James Picton; The Albany (1856–58) by James Kellaway Colling and let to cotton traders; Hargreaves Building (1859), 5 Chapel Street by James Picton; Berey's Buildings (1864), Bixteth Street, designed by William Culshaw and let to cotton traders; Rigby's Buildings (1865) Dale Street, stuccoed office building with older warehouse behind; Mason's Building (c.1866), Exchange Street East, by John Cunningham, let to cotton traders; Imperial Chambers (c.1870), Dale Street, architect unknown, in a Gothic style and with a glazed roof courtyard; Built as an office with warehouse behind, for the brewer Peter Walker, 64 to 66 Duke Street, designed by John Elliot Reeve; Central Buildings, North John Street, large office building for the period, by Thomas C. Clarke; Princes Buildings (1882), Dale Street, by Henry Shelmerdine; 12 Hanover Street (1889–90), office building with adjoining warehouse, by Edmund Kirby; Victoria Chambers (1893); 40–42 Castle Street, by Grayson & Ould. Century Buildings (1901), Victoria Street is by Henry Hartley. Boldly Gothic is Musker's Buildings (1881–82) in Dale Street by Thomas E. Murray. 25 & 27 Victoria Street (1881), by W.H. Picton. New Zealand House (1893), 18 Water Street is by Walter Aubrey Thomas. Imperial Buildings (1879), Victoria Street are by E. & H. Shelmerdine.

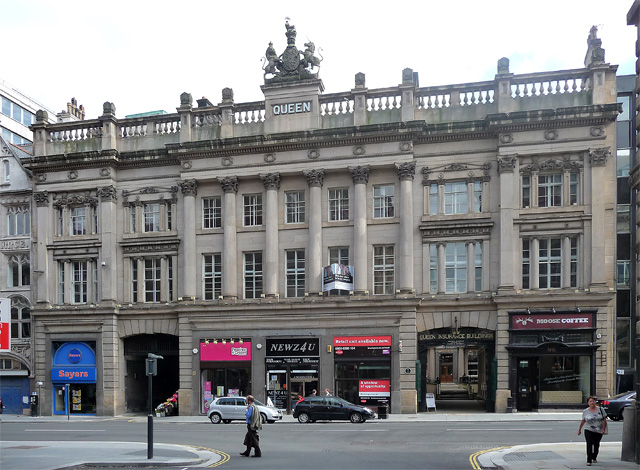
Former Royal Bank Buildings, Dale Street
(1839; Grade II)

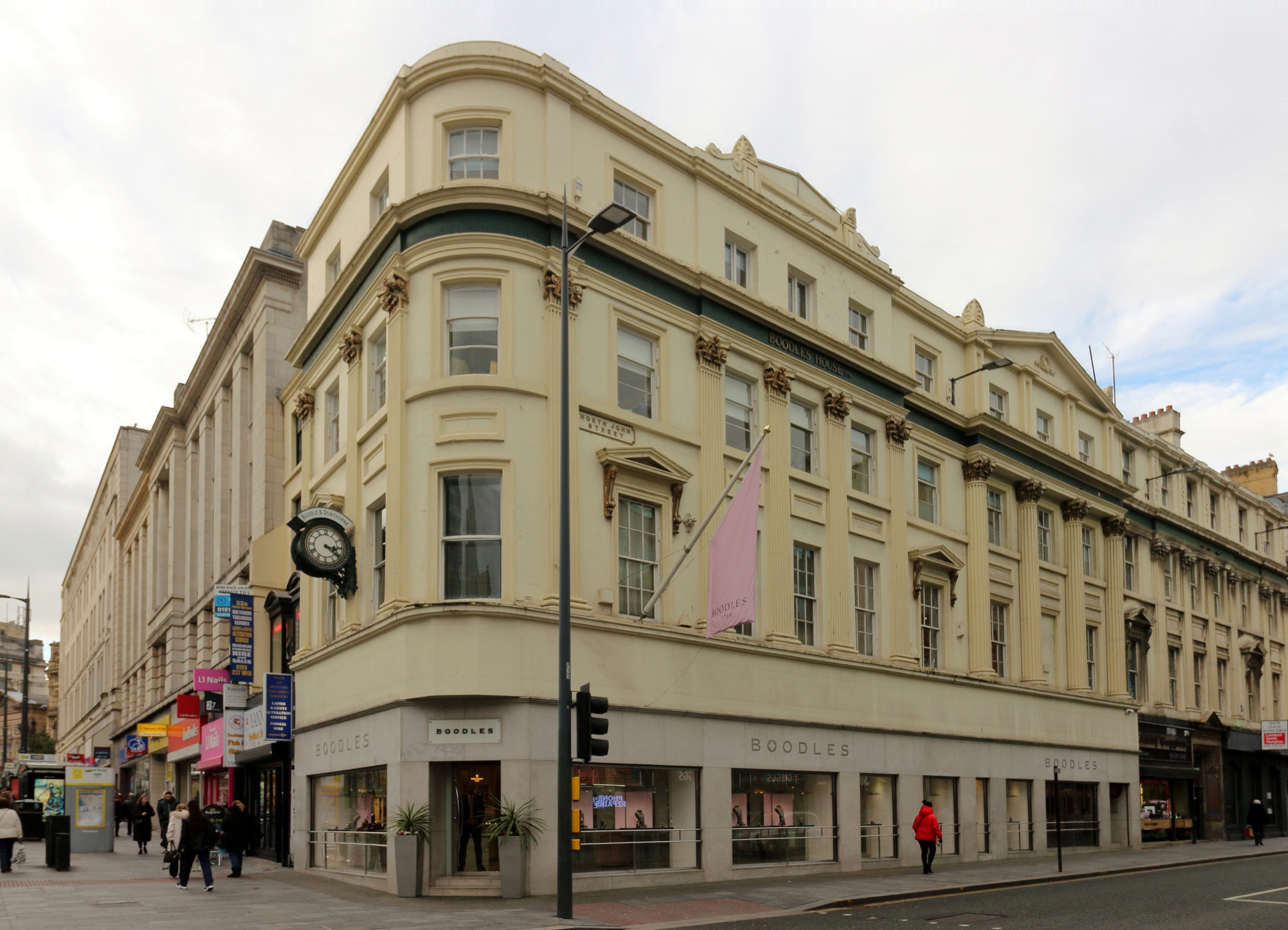
Clarence Buildings & Marldon Chambers, North John Street
(1841; Grade II)

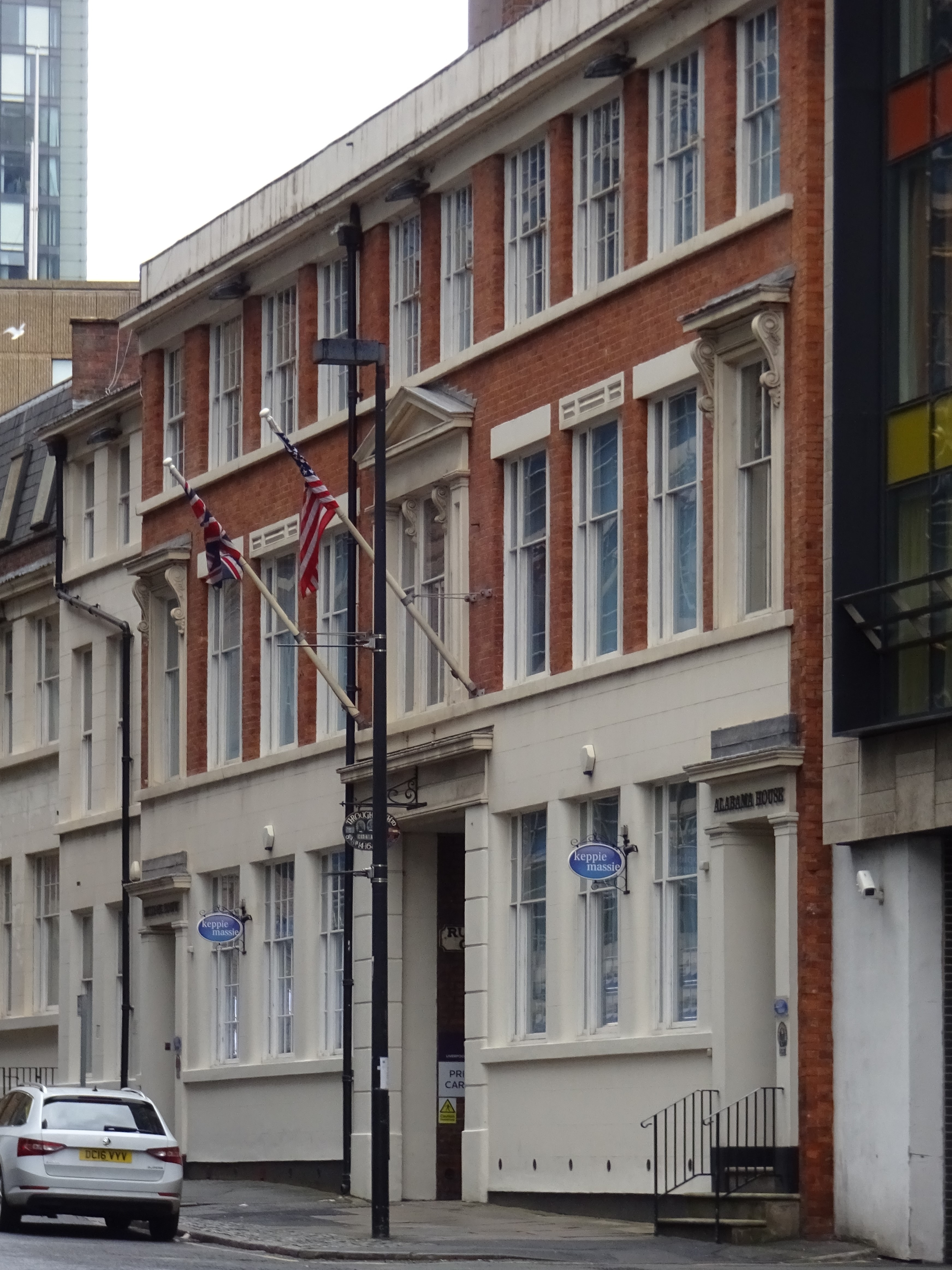
6-10 Rumford Place, "the Confederate Embassy"
(1840s; Grade II)

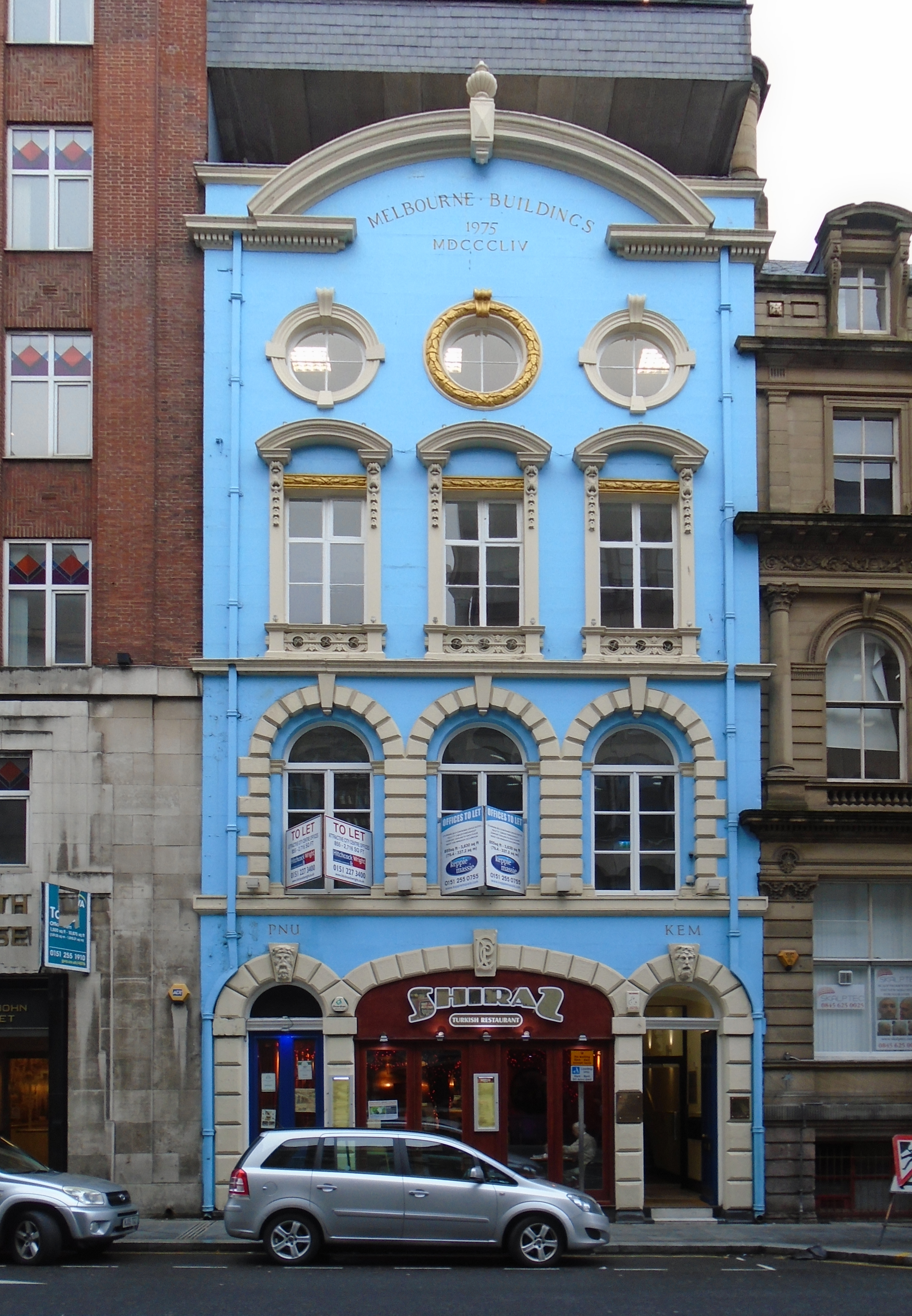
Melbourne Buildings, North John Street
(1854; Grade II)

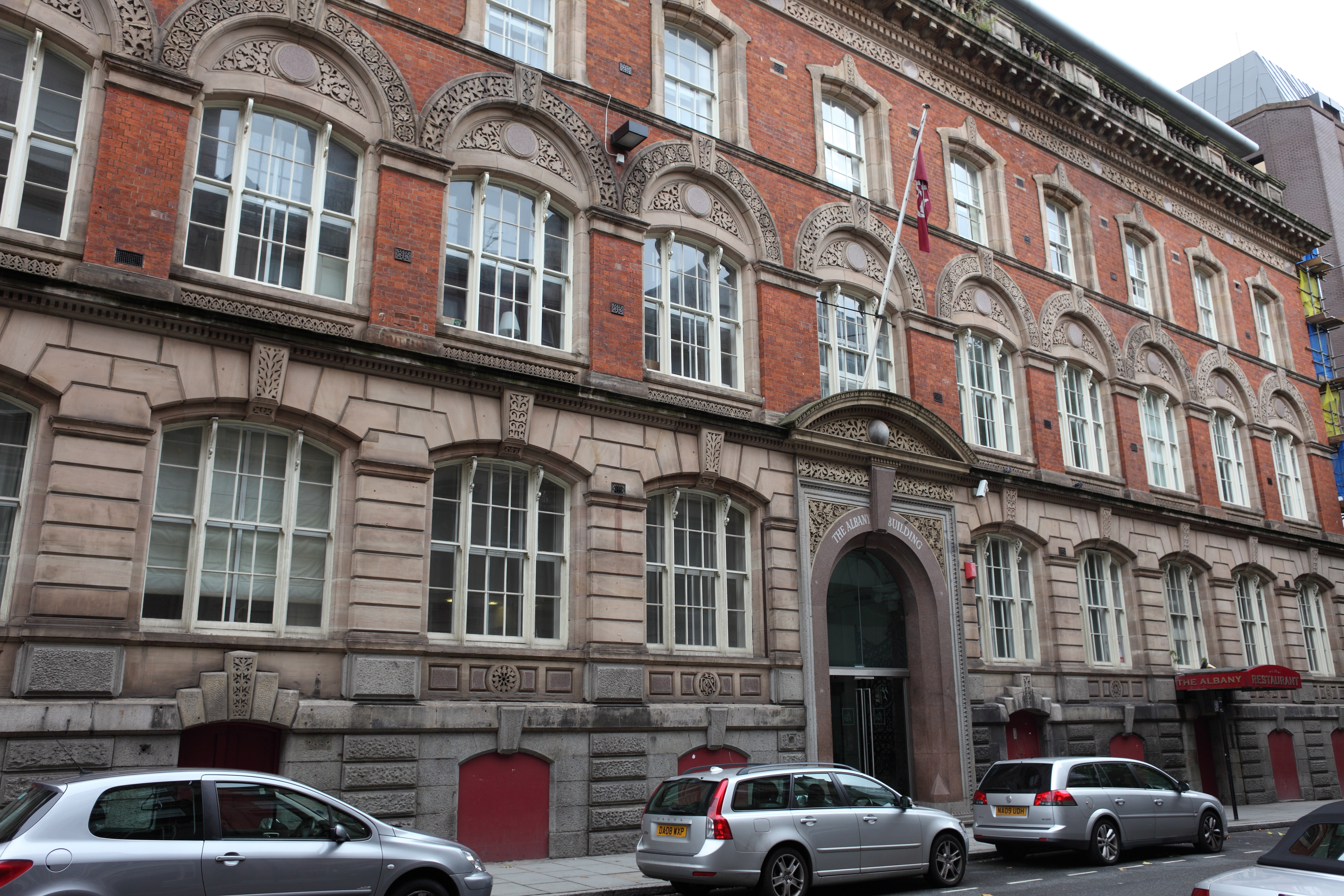
The Albany, Old Hall Street
(1856–58; Grade II*)

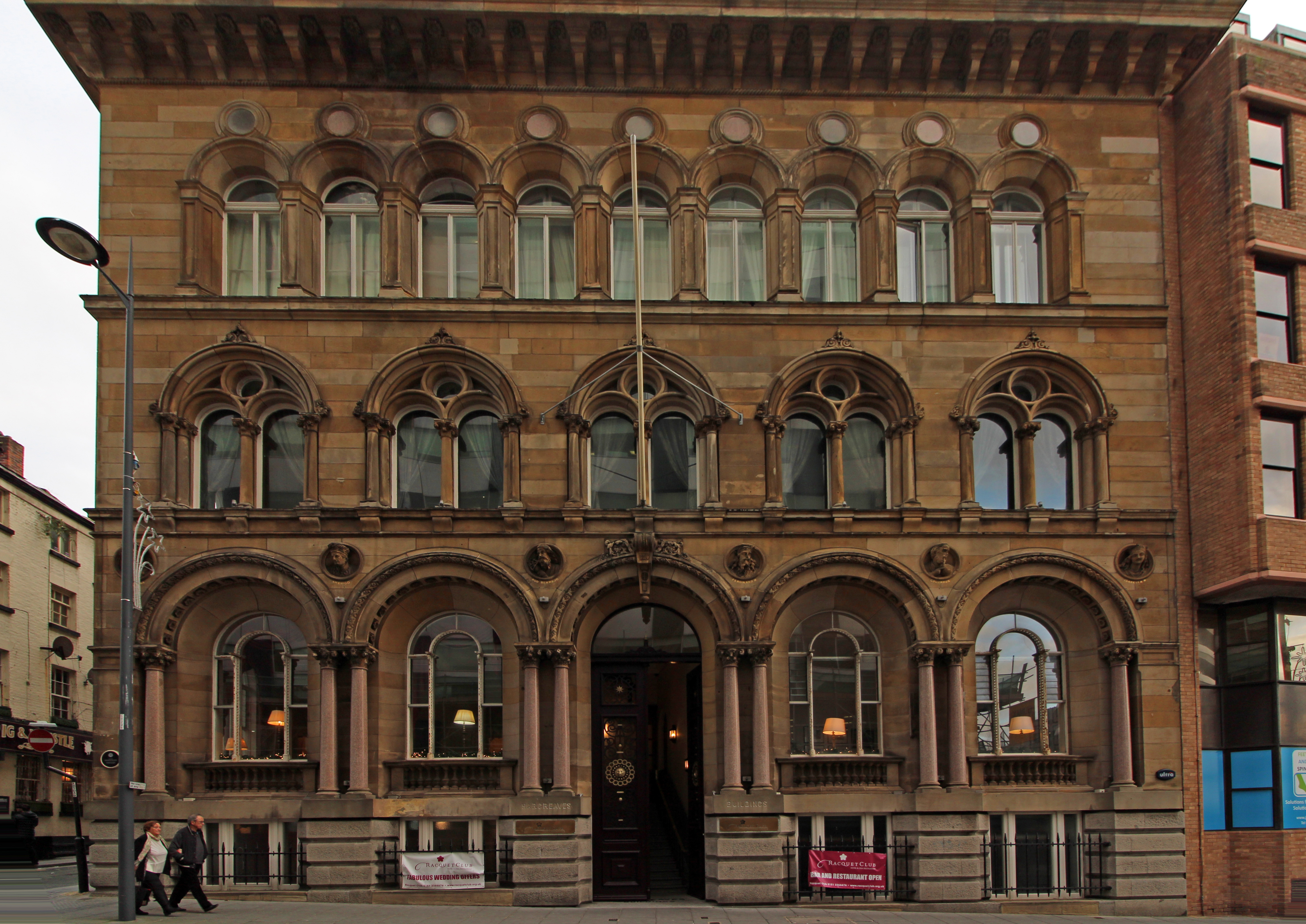
Hargreaves Building, 5 Chapel Street
(1859; Grade II)

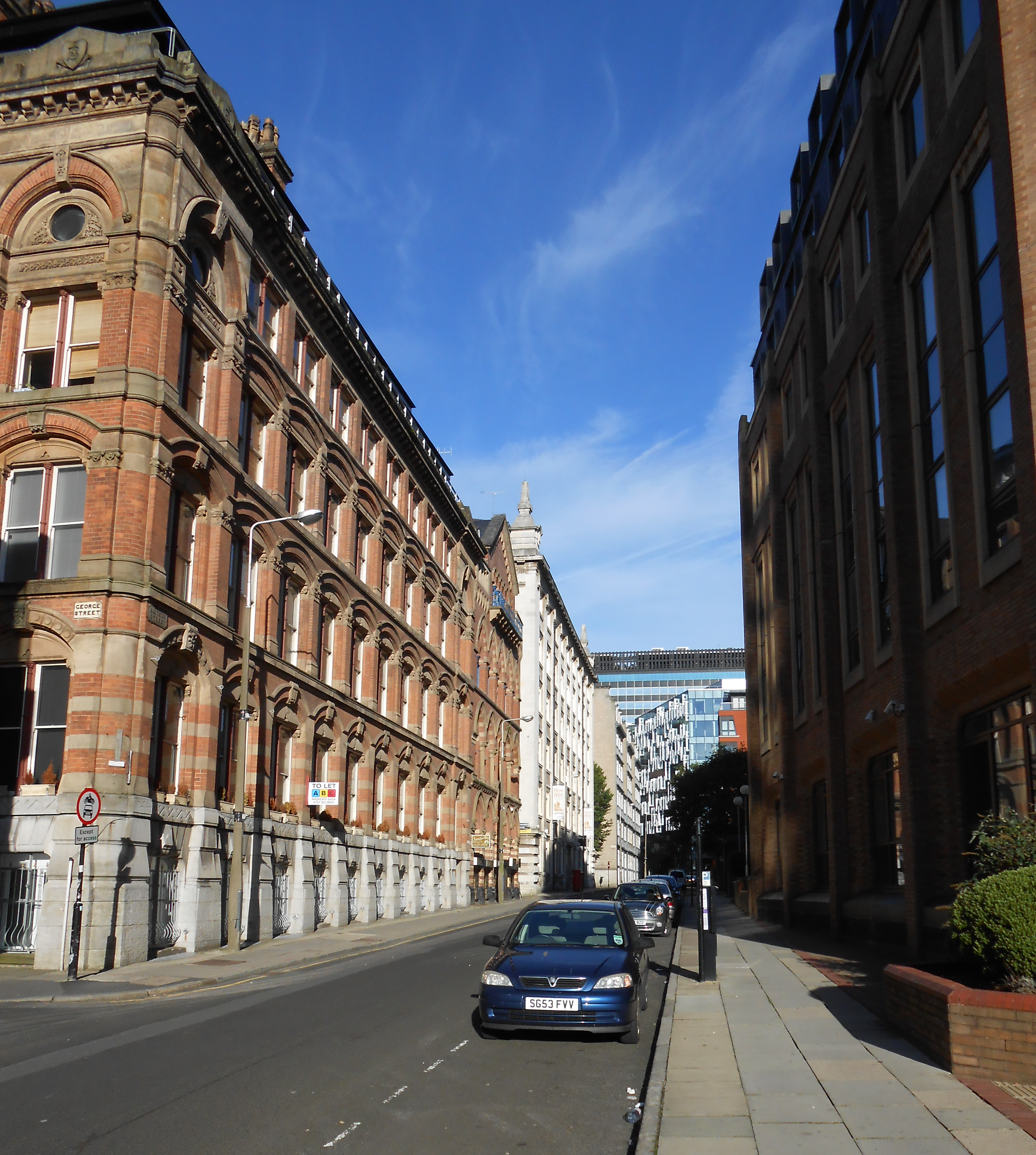
Berey's Buildings, left, Bixteth Street
(1864; Grade II)

==== Office buildings by Peter Ellis ====
Peter Ellis was an obscure architect and civil engineer who, nevertheless, designed the pioneering Oriel Chambers (1864) in Water Street as "one of the first office buildings to be clad in glazed curtain-walling" in its rear courtyard. Well ahead of its time, the building was severely criticised in The Builder of 16 June 1866 as a "large agglomeration of protruding plate-glass bubbles", a "vast abortion" without any aesthetic qualities. In all likelihood, however, it was studied by young John Wellborn Root who spent some time in Liverpool to escape the American Civil War just when Ellis' building had been finished. Root took some of Ellis' ideas back to America where he later became an important architect of the Chicago School of Architecture. Oriel Chambers, therefore, played an important role in the development of the skyscraper. Ellis' only other known building, 16 Cook Street, Liverpool, dates from 1866 and also features a curtain wall in its rear courtyard.

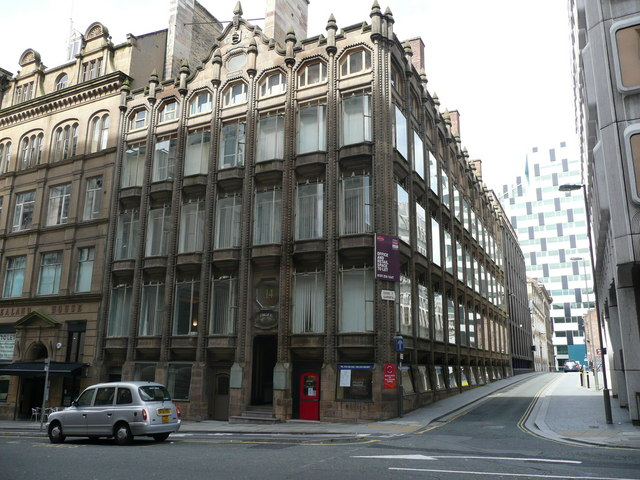
Oriel Chambers, Water Street
(1864; Grade I)

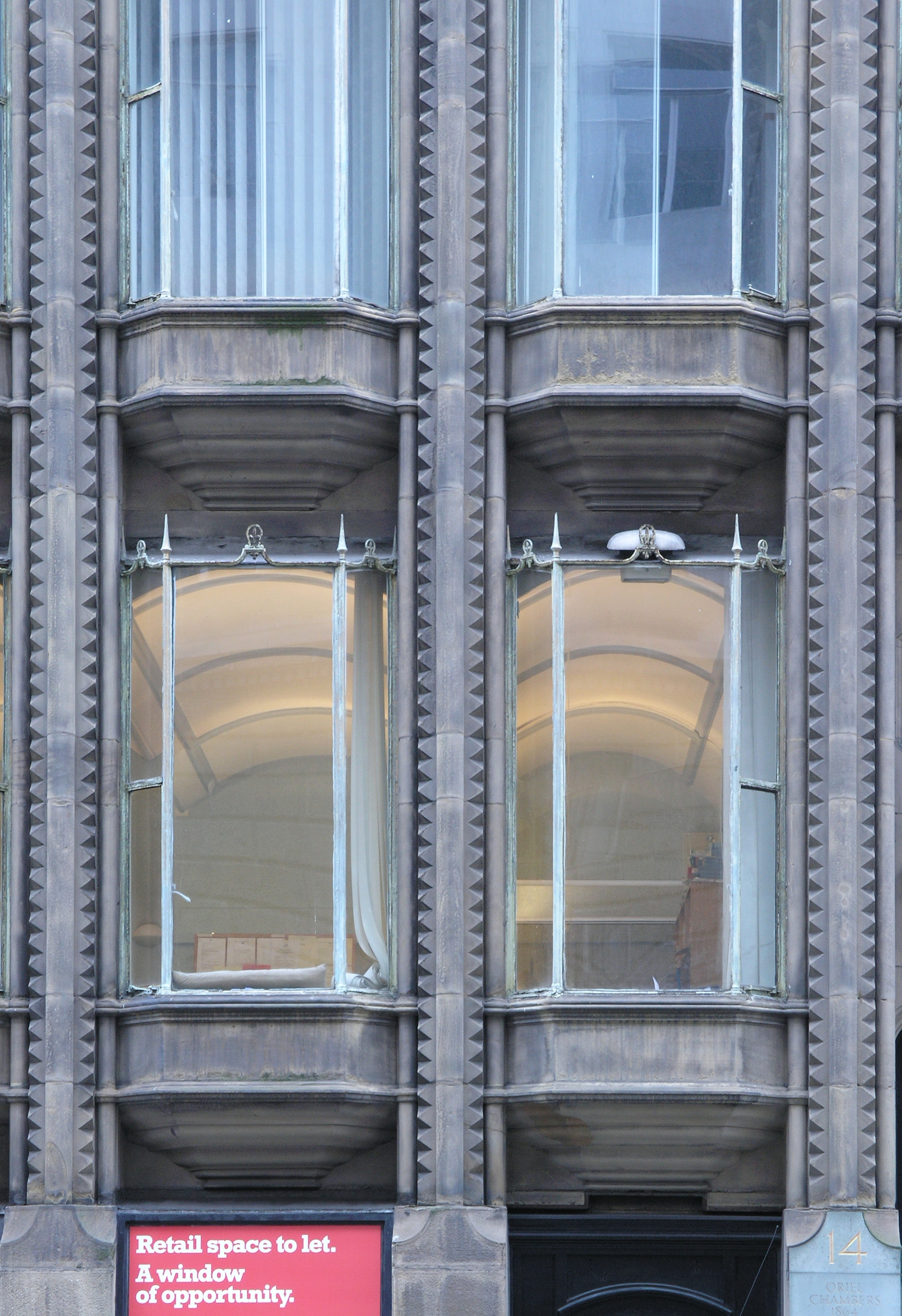
Detail of windows, Oriel Chambers
(1864; Grade I)

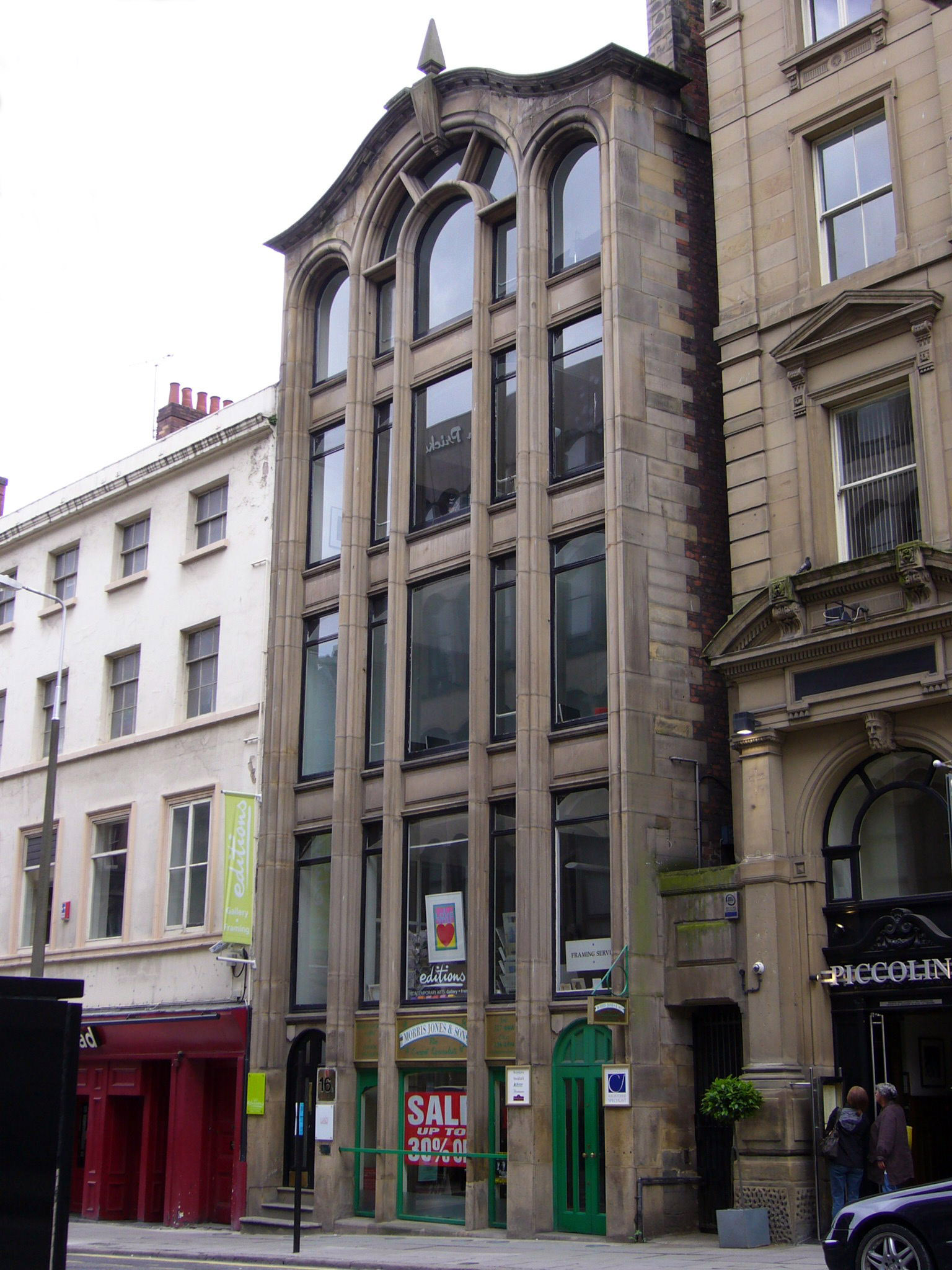
16 Cook Street
(1866; Grade II*)

=== Victorian retail and wholesale buildings ===
As Liverpool expanded so retail buildings grew in grandeur to meet the rising demand in an increasingly prosperous city. Victorian retail buildings are found amongst others on Church Street, Victoria Street, Lord Street & Bold Street and include: 14–16 Bold Street, built (1848) for John Cripps, Shawl Merchant and manufacturer; 25 Church Street (1858) was built for Elkington's art metalworkers and Electroplating business by Lewis Hornblower; Compton House (1866–67), Church Street, built for J.R. Jeffrey by Thomas Haigh & Company, it one of the first purpose-built Department stores in the world; Former Agnew's art dealers (1877), 1 Castle Street; Former Robert & Jones jewellery shop at 2 Castle Street (1882), in an early 16th-century French style; The Fruit Exchange (c.1888), Victoria Street, built as a goods depot, converted to exchange in 1923; 92 Bold Street (1890s), is a late example of Greek Revival architecture, attributed to W. & G. Audsley; 58 Bold Street (c.1900), is an unusual example of an Arts and Crafts movement shop, ascribed to T. Myddleton Shallcross. Wholesale is represented by the Commercial Saleroom Buildings (1879), Victoria Street, by James F. Doyle, used for wholesale auctions of imported fruit. The bold arches, the Italian Gothic 81–89 Lord Street by Walter Aubrey Thomas is a grand building, also in Lord Street is Venice Chambers, by Edmund Kirkby.

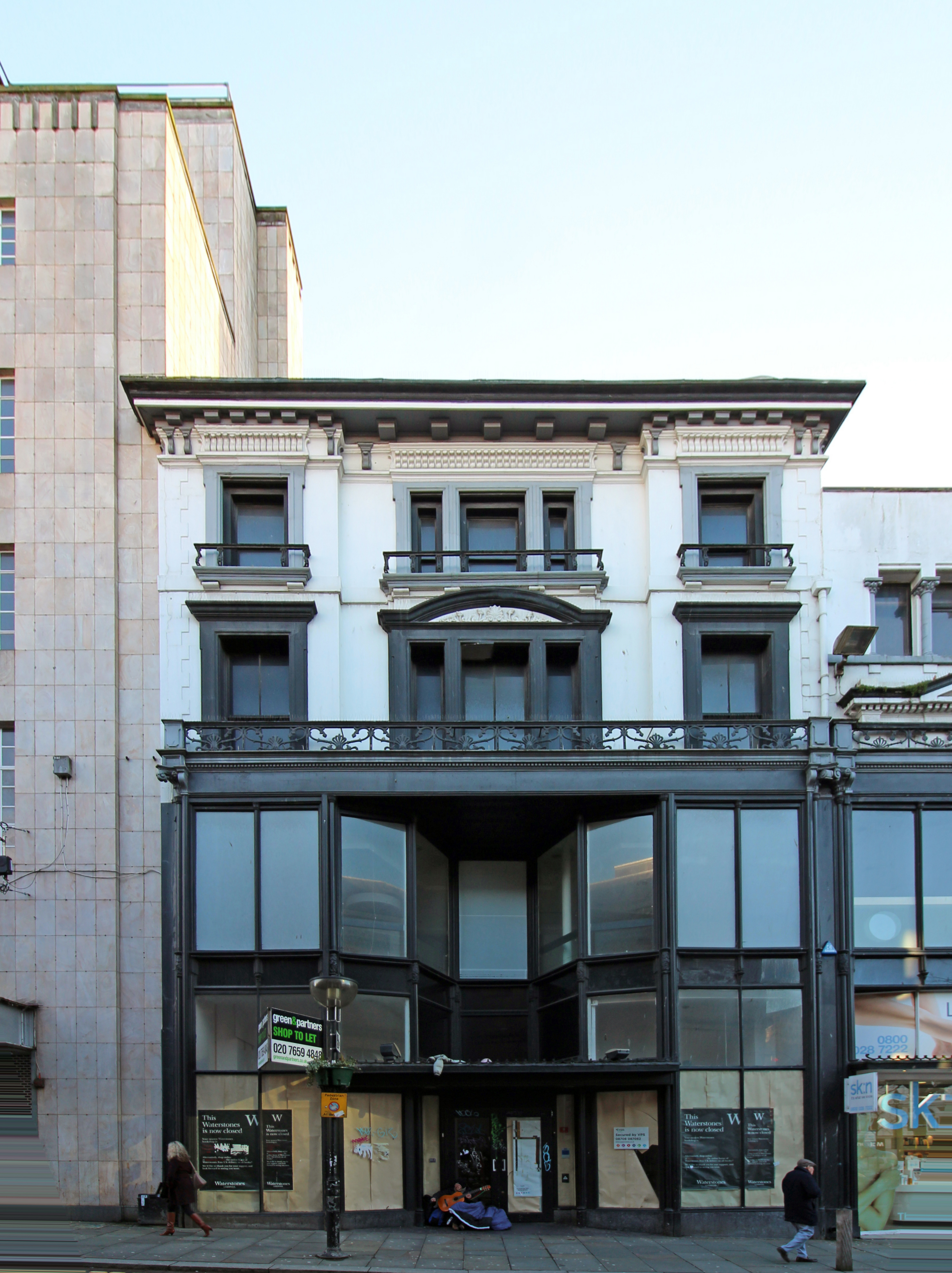
14 & 16 Bold Street
(1848; Grade II)

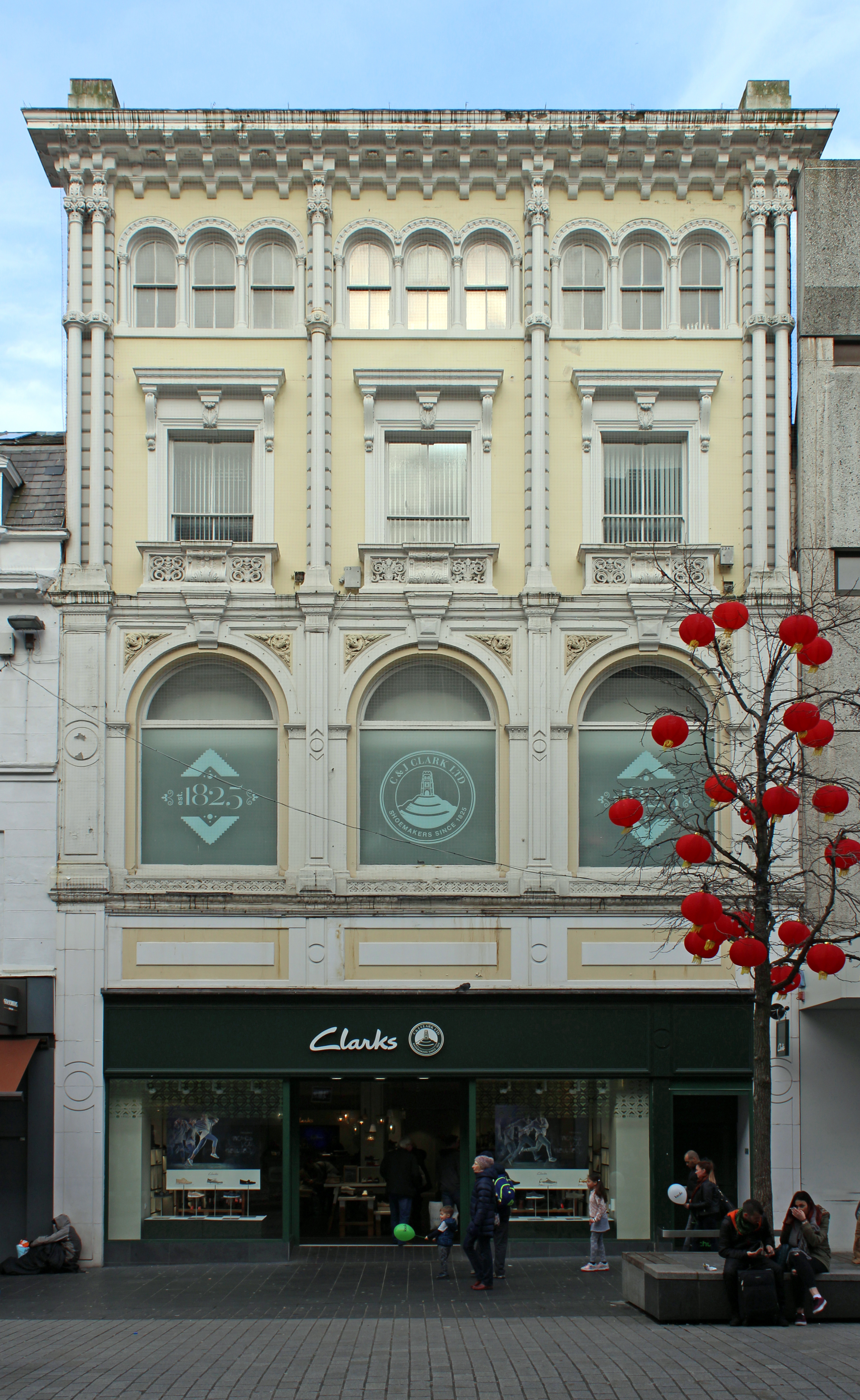
25 Church Street, built for Elkington's Electroplate business
(c.1858; Grade II)

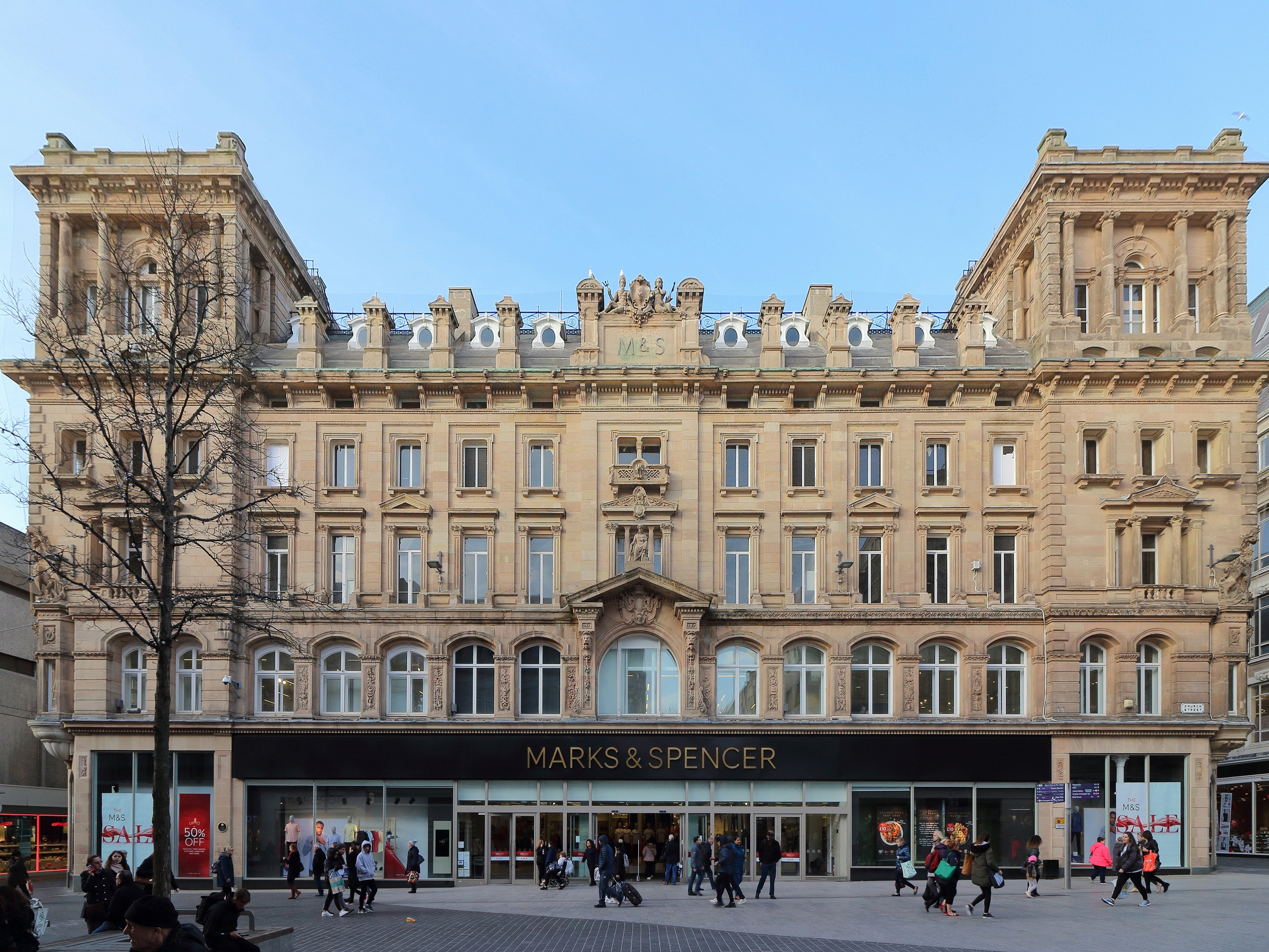
Compton House, Church Street
(1866–67; Grade II)
First purpose-built department store in the UK

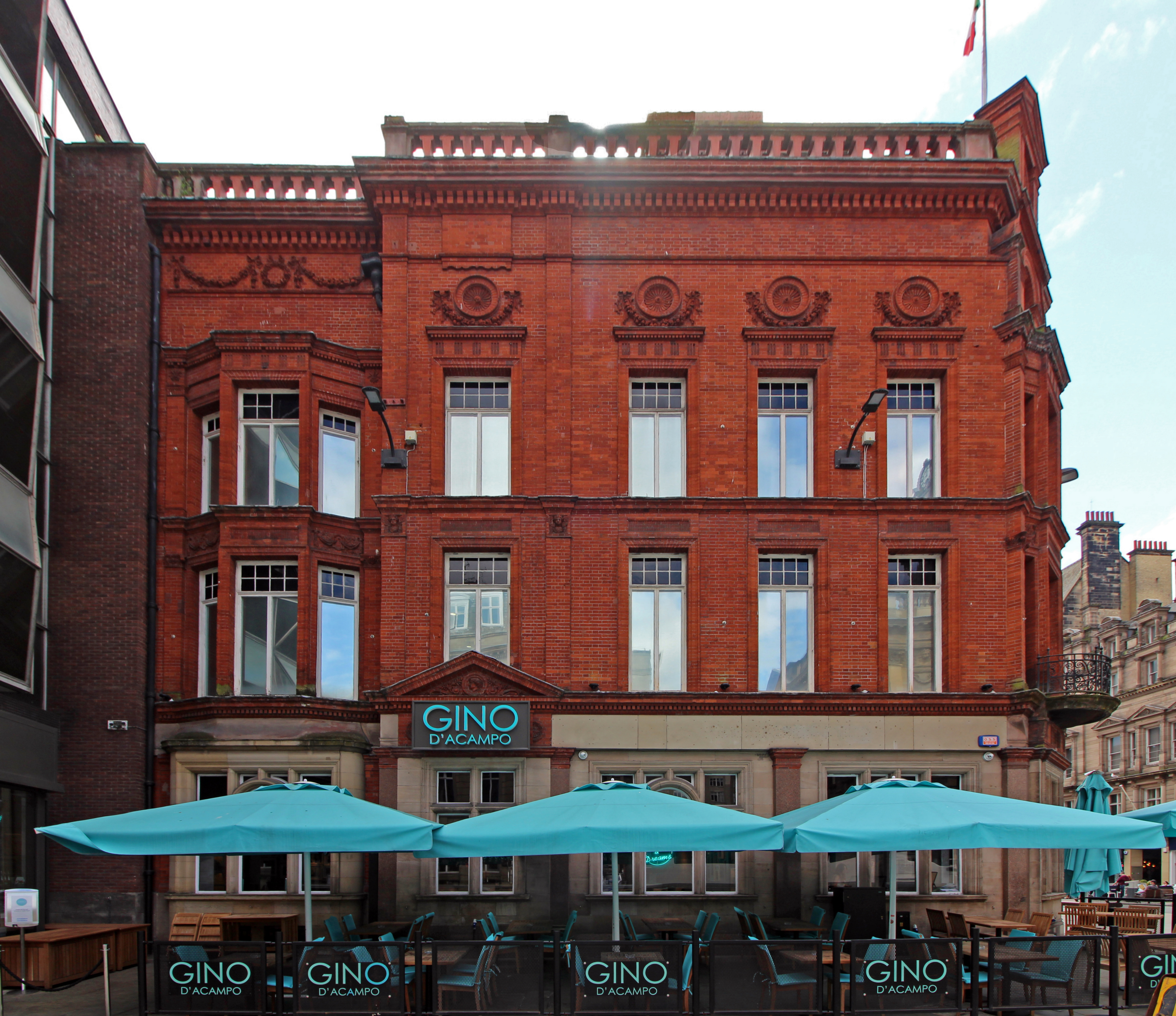
Former Agnew's art dealers, 1 Castle Street
(1877; Grade II)

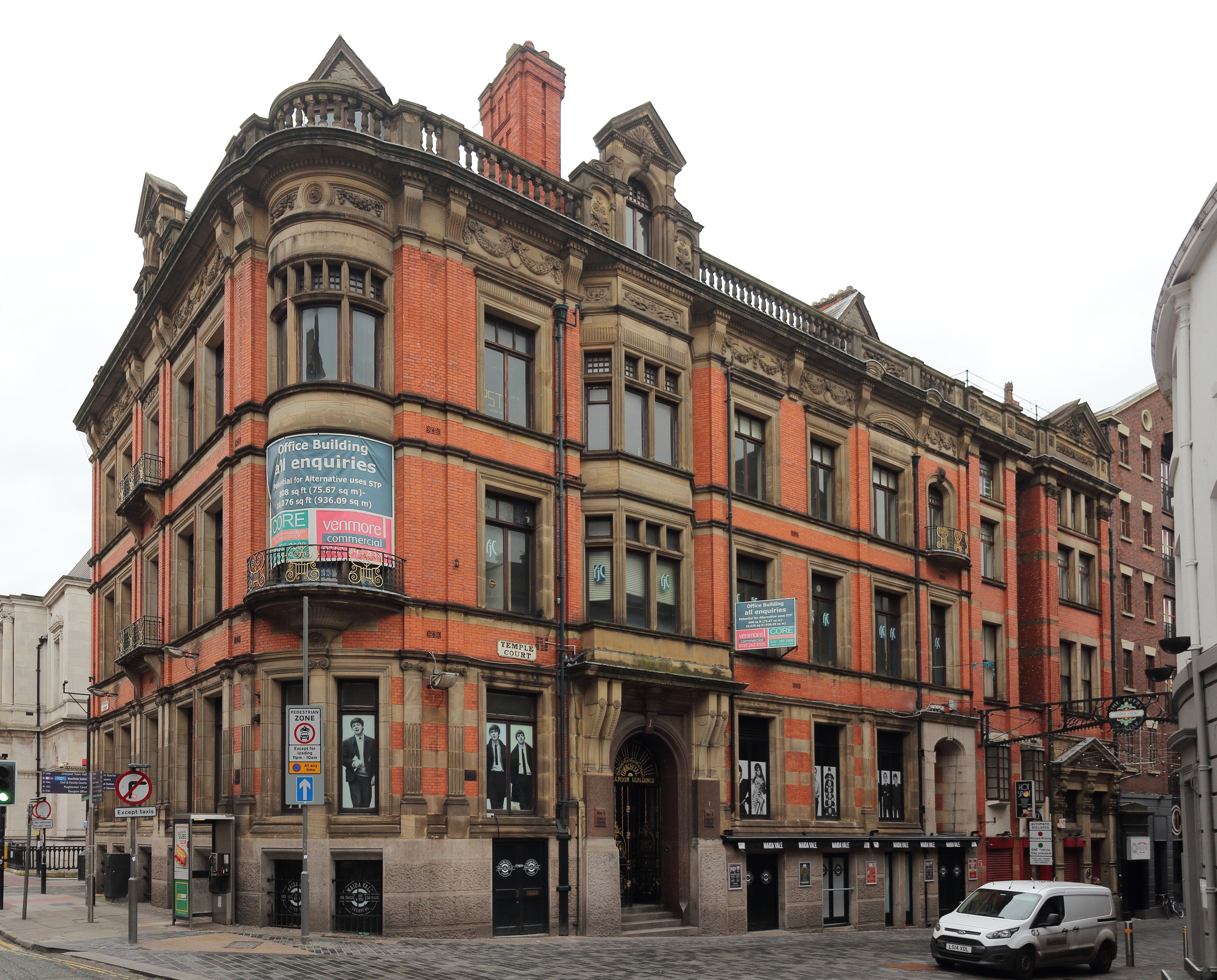
Commercial Saleroom Buildings, Victoria Street
(1879; Grade II)

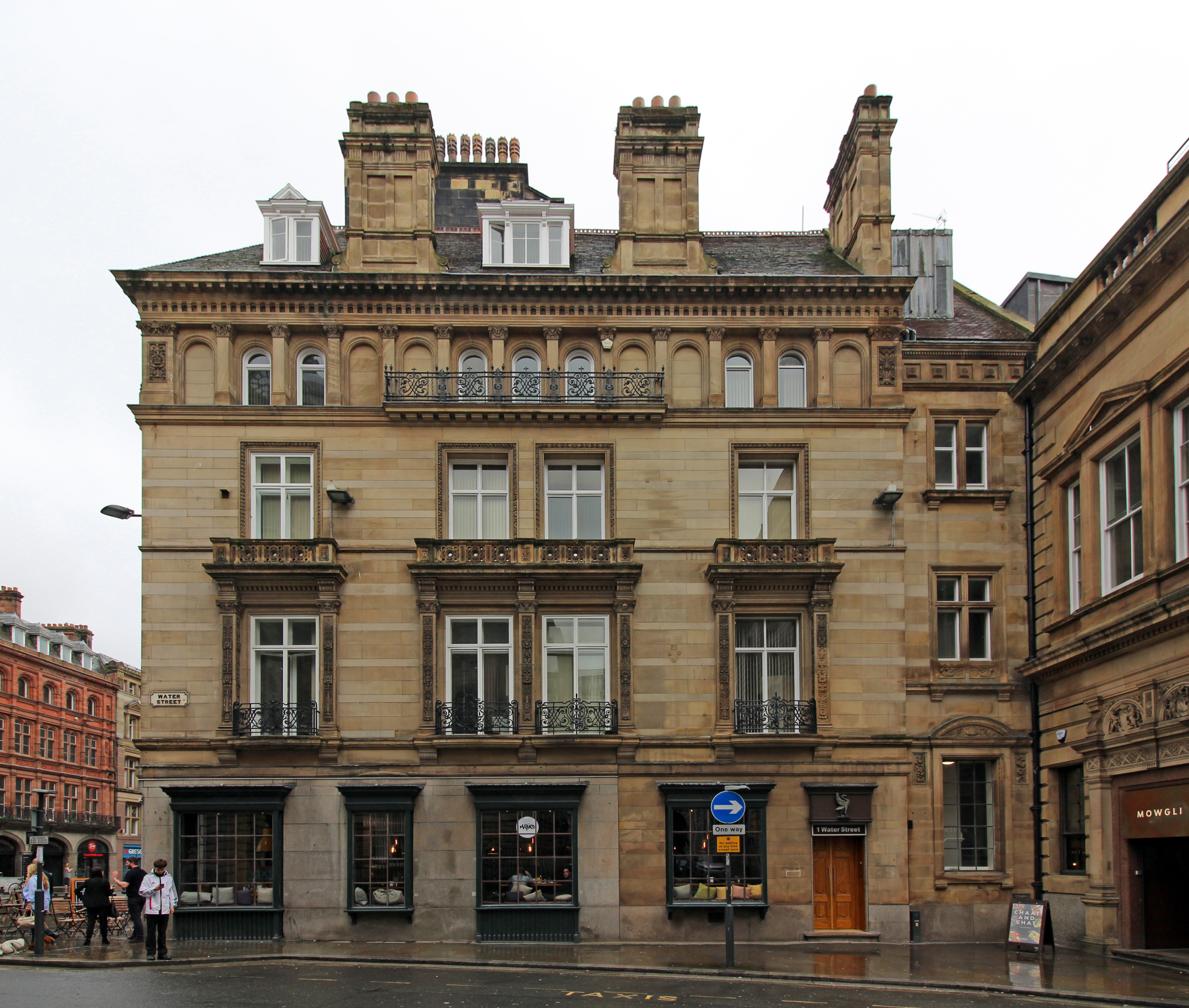
Former Robert & Jones jewellery shop, 2 Castle Street
(1882; Grade II)

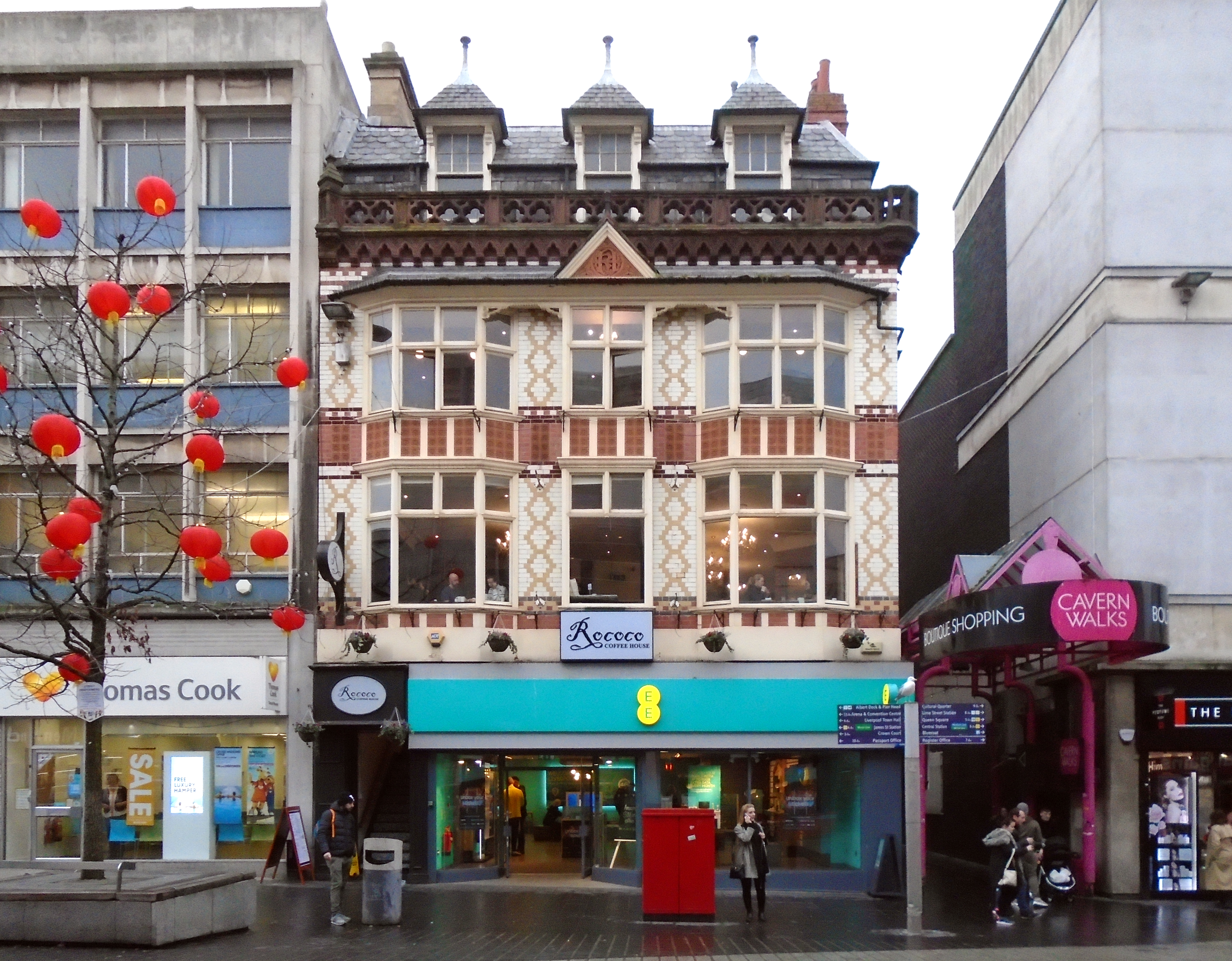
Venice Chambers, Lord Street
(1882; Grade II)

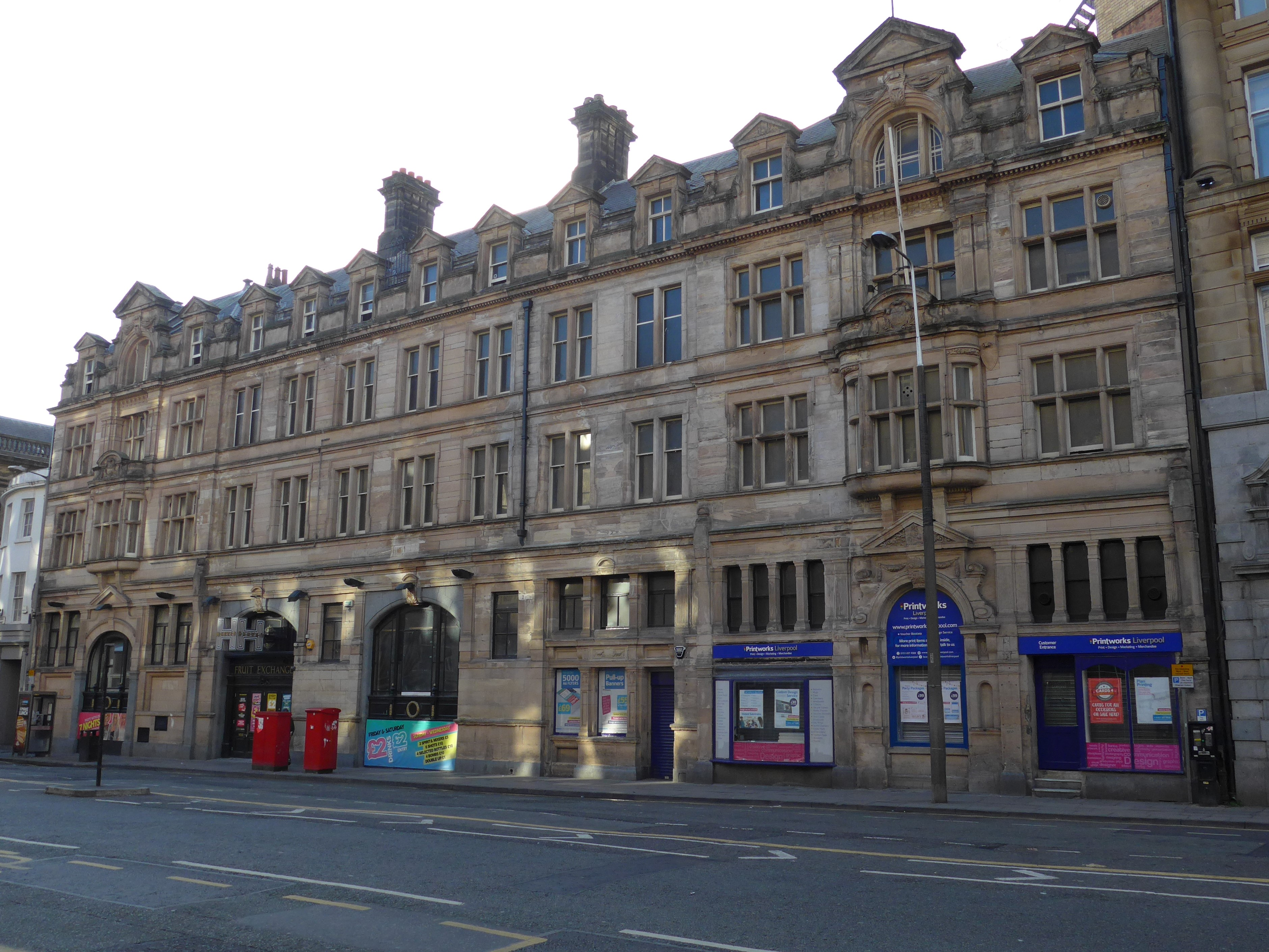
Fruit Exchange, Victoria Street
(c.1888; Grade II)

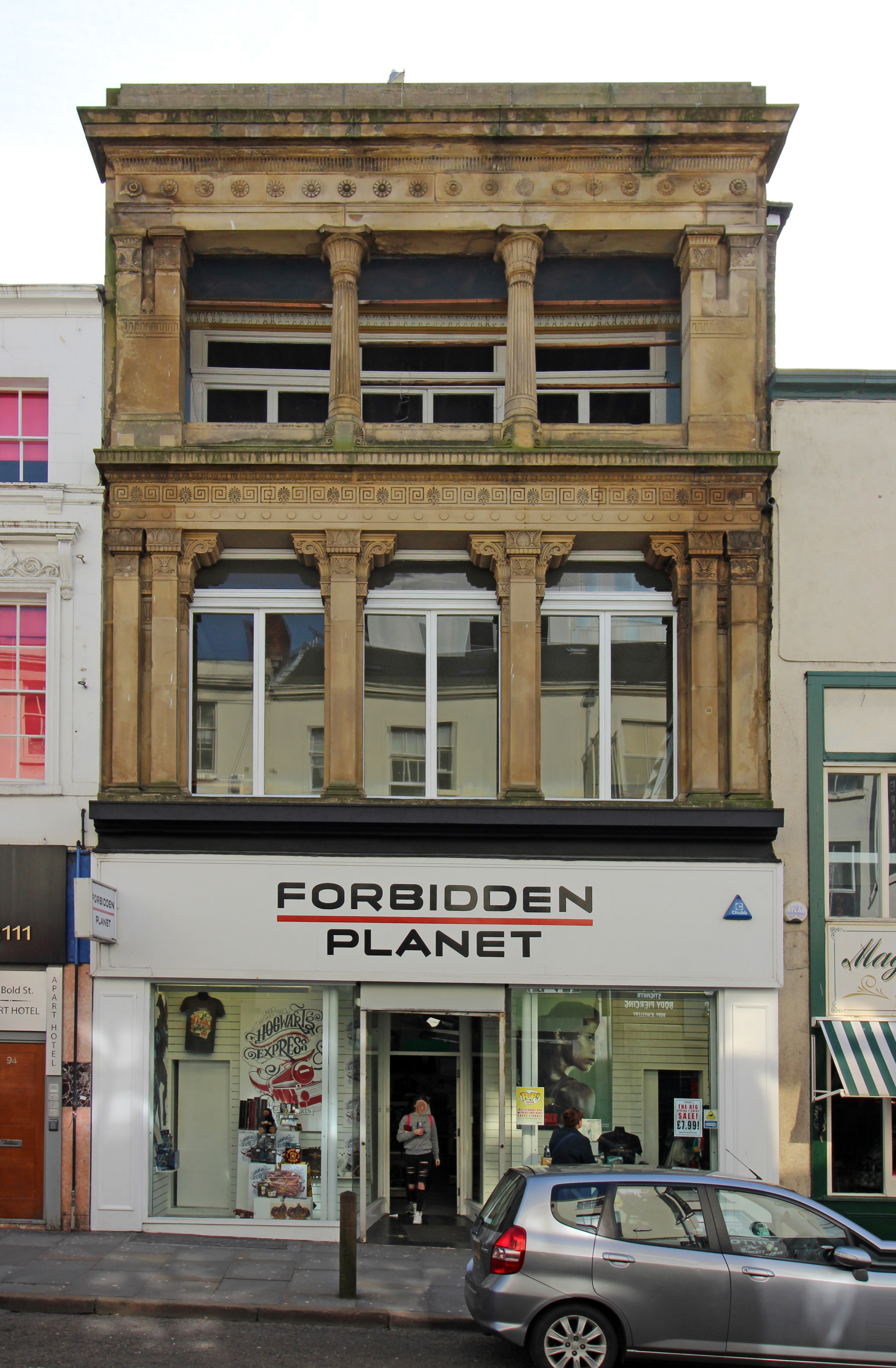
92 Bold Street
(1890s; Grade II)

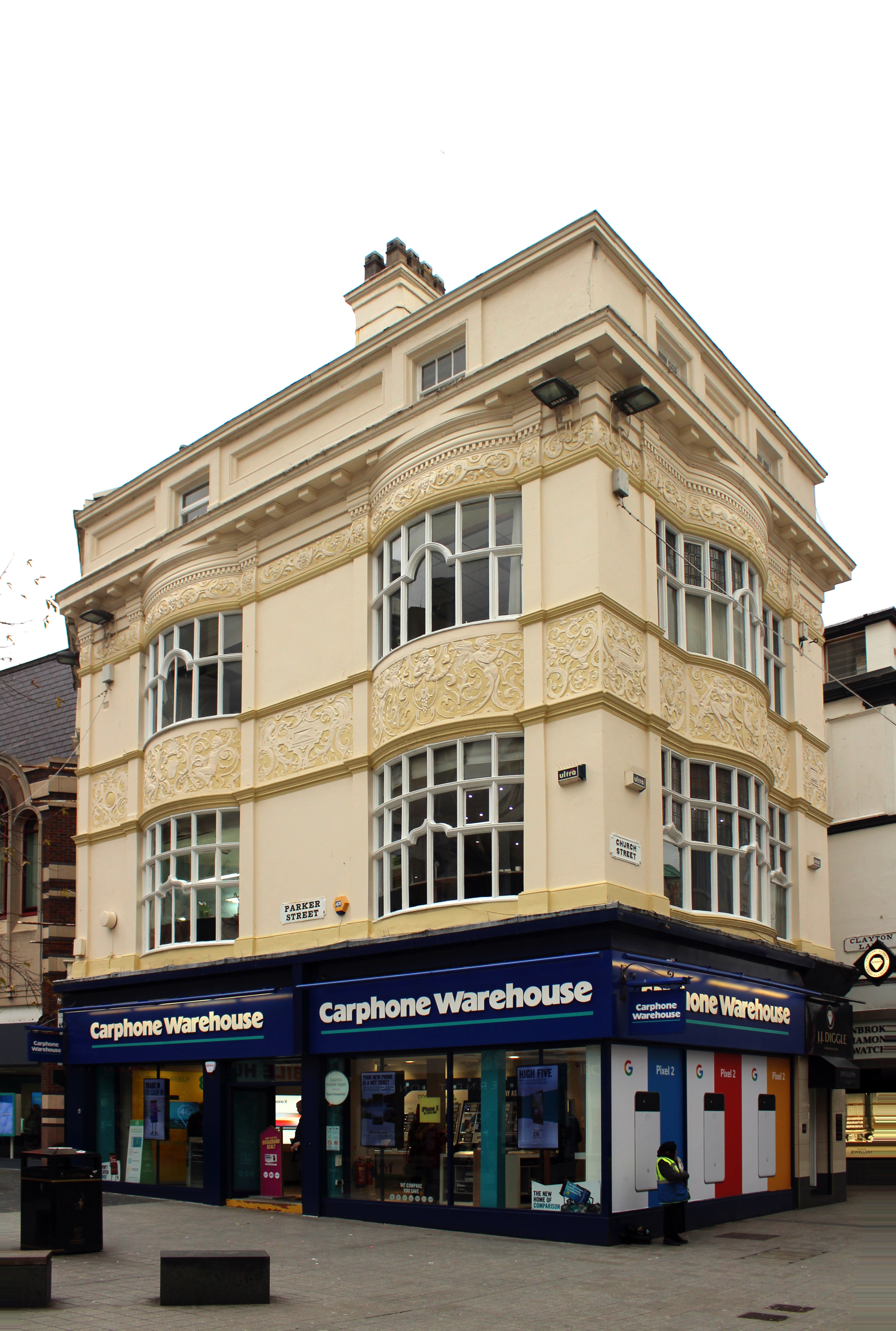
69 Church Street
(1890s; Grade II)

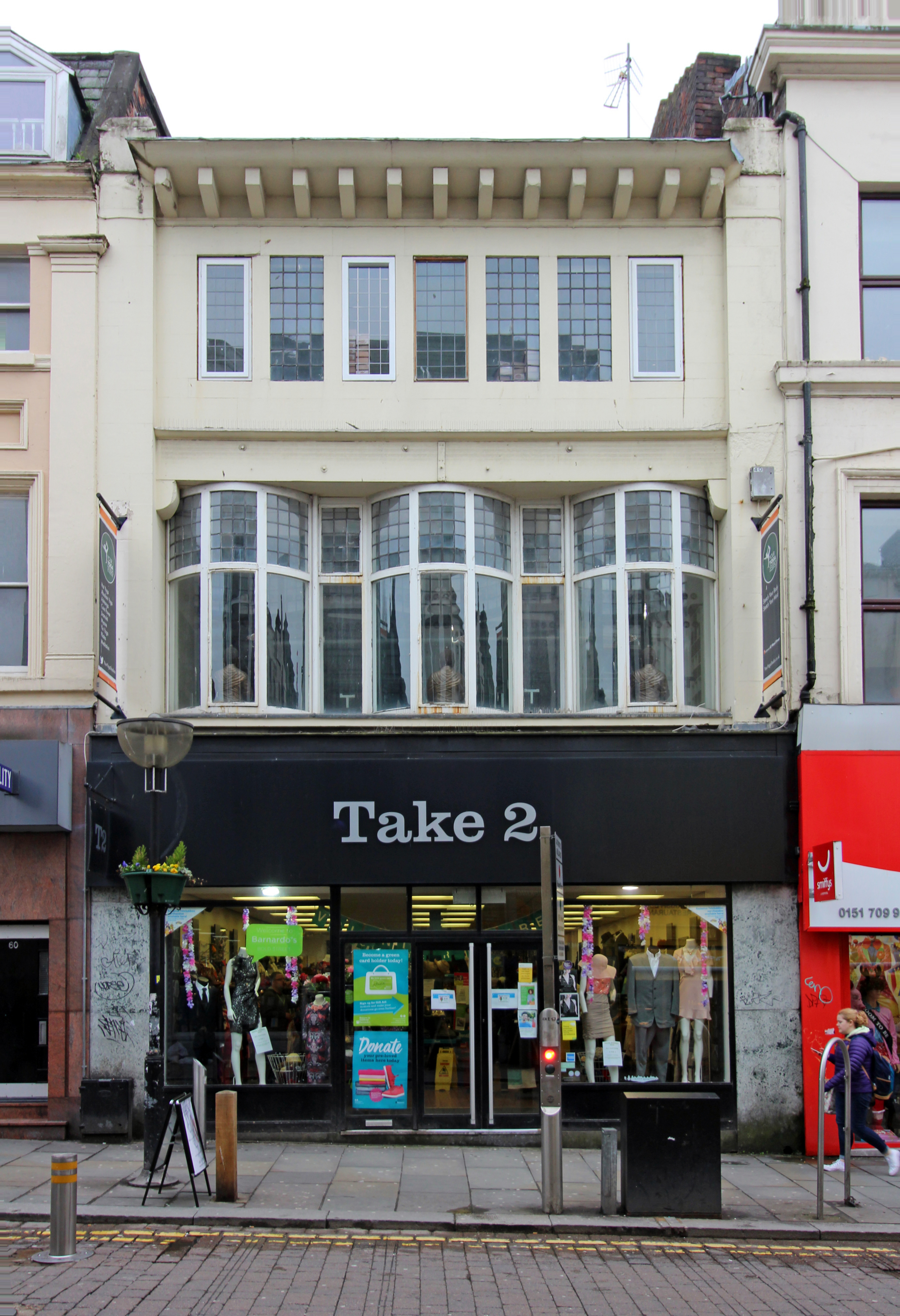
58 Bold Street
(c.1900; Grade II)

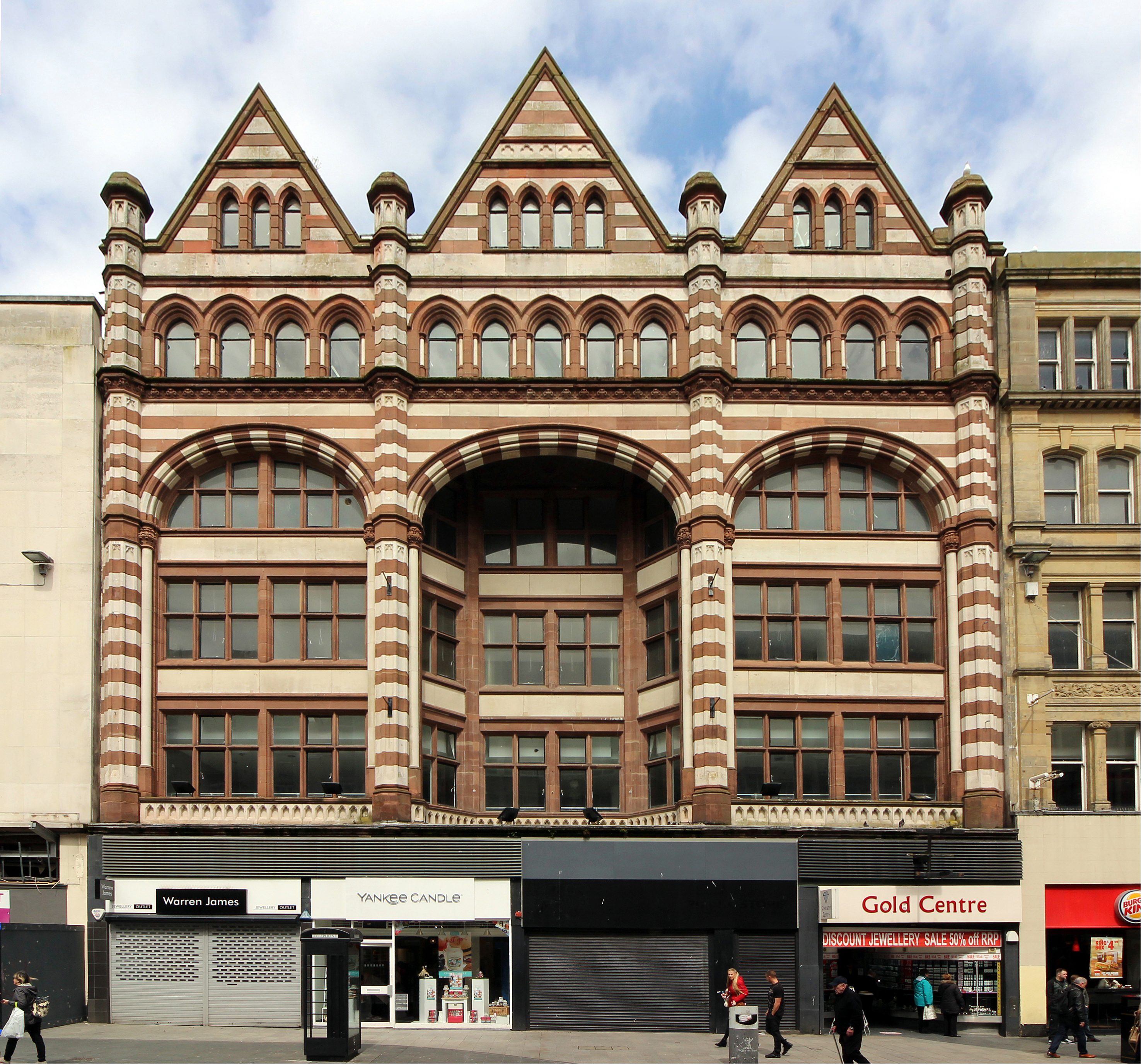
81-89 Lord Street
(1901; Grade II)

=== Victorian buildings for health, education & social care ===
In an age before social security or the National Health Service, any provision of medical or social care depended on charity or had to be privately paid for, even education prior to the Elementary Education Act 1870 was so dependent. Liverpool's wealthy elite and the comfortable class below them created institutions and supported them through donations. For example, Andrew Barclay Walker not only paid for the Walker Art Gallery with a £50,000 (over £5,000,000 in 2019) donation but gave towards the founding of the university, as did Henry Tate and George Holt. Both William Pickles Hartley and William Rathbone gave away a third of their income to charity. See the Alfred Waterhouse section below for buildings designed by him, including Royal Infirmary, University of Liverpool, the Turner Memorial Home and the Seaman's Orphanage. Liverpool had many examples of Victorian buildings created to provide health, social care and education.

==== Victorian schools, colleges and libraries ====
Notable educational buildings of the era are Liverpool Collegiate School, (1840–43) in a Tudor Gothic style by Harvey Lonsdale Elmes. Other institutional buildings include Blackburne House built 1788 and extensively remodelled (1874–76) by W.I. Mason in French Second Empire style, became the Blackburne House Girls' School (1844). The former Royal School for the Blind, Hardman Street, (1849–51) in classical style by A.H. Holme (Now a Trades Union Building), a new building for the school opened in 1899 in Wavertree. An example of a board school, formerly Arnot Street School, Walton, is a post-1870 education school and was designed by Edmund Kirby (1884 extended 1894), other surviving board schools are, Chatsworth School (1874), Edge Hill, designed by Thomas Mellard Reade, who also designed Granby Street School (1880), Toxteth. Liverpool College of Art designed by Thomas Cook and opened in 1883 in the Queen Anne style architecture. At the end of the period the College of Technology and Museum Extension was built to the designs of Edward William Mountford, completed (1901). The first branch library in the city was Kensington Library 1890 extended 1897, Edge Hill by the City of Liverpool Surveyor Thomas Shelmerdine, who also designed Everton Library, built in 1896, also the designed by Shelmerdine is the Technical Institute, Picton Road, Wavertree. The former St Austin's school (1860), Aigburth Road provided elementary education for the local Roman Catholic population of Aigburth. Henry Clutton designed a major extension (1877) to St Francis Xavier's College, Liverpool for the Roman Catholic Church to provide education for adherents of the Church. The former Gordon Working Lads' Institute (1886) by David Walker, in a northern Renaissance style, it provided technical education for the working class and contained classrooms, gymnasium and concert hall, it was paid for by merchant and ship owner William Cliff. The equivalent for girls was the Bankhall Girls' Institute (1889), Stanley Road, Kirkdale, this was funded by Thomas Worthington Cookson, merchant and shipowner. The Catholic church built St Vincent's School for the Blind (1899), Yew Tree Lane, West Derby.

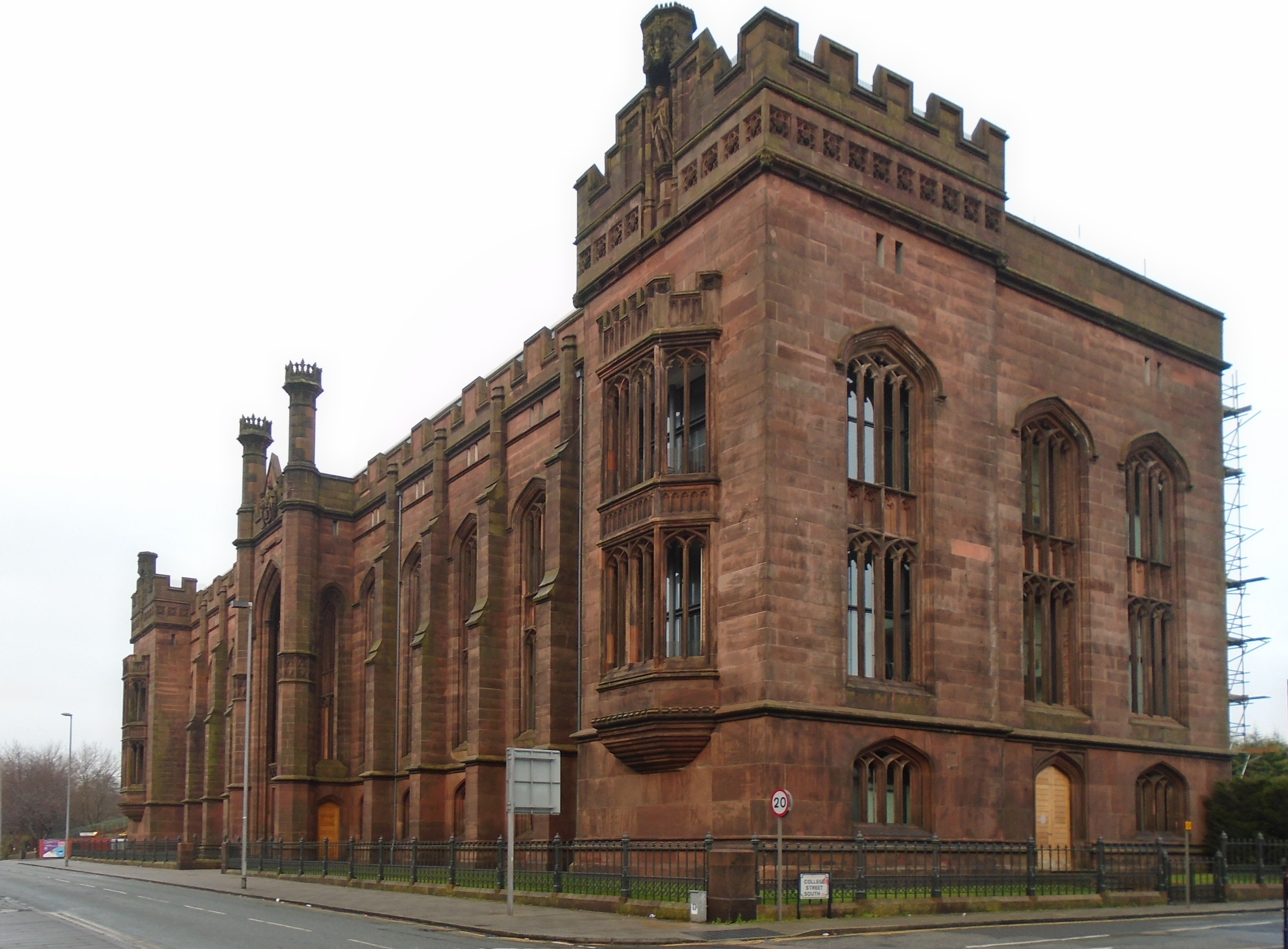
Former Liverpool Collegiate School, Shaw Street, Everton
(1840–43; Grade II*)

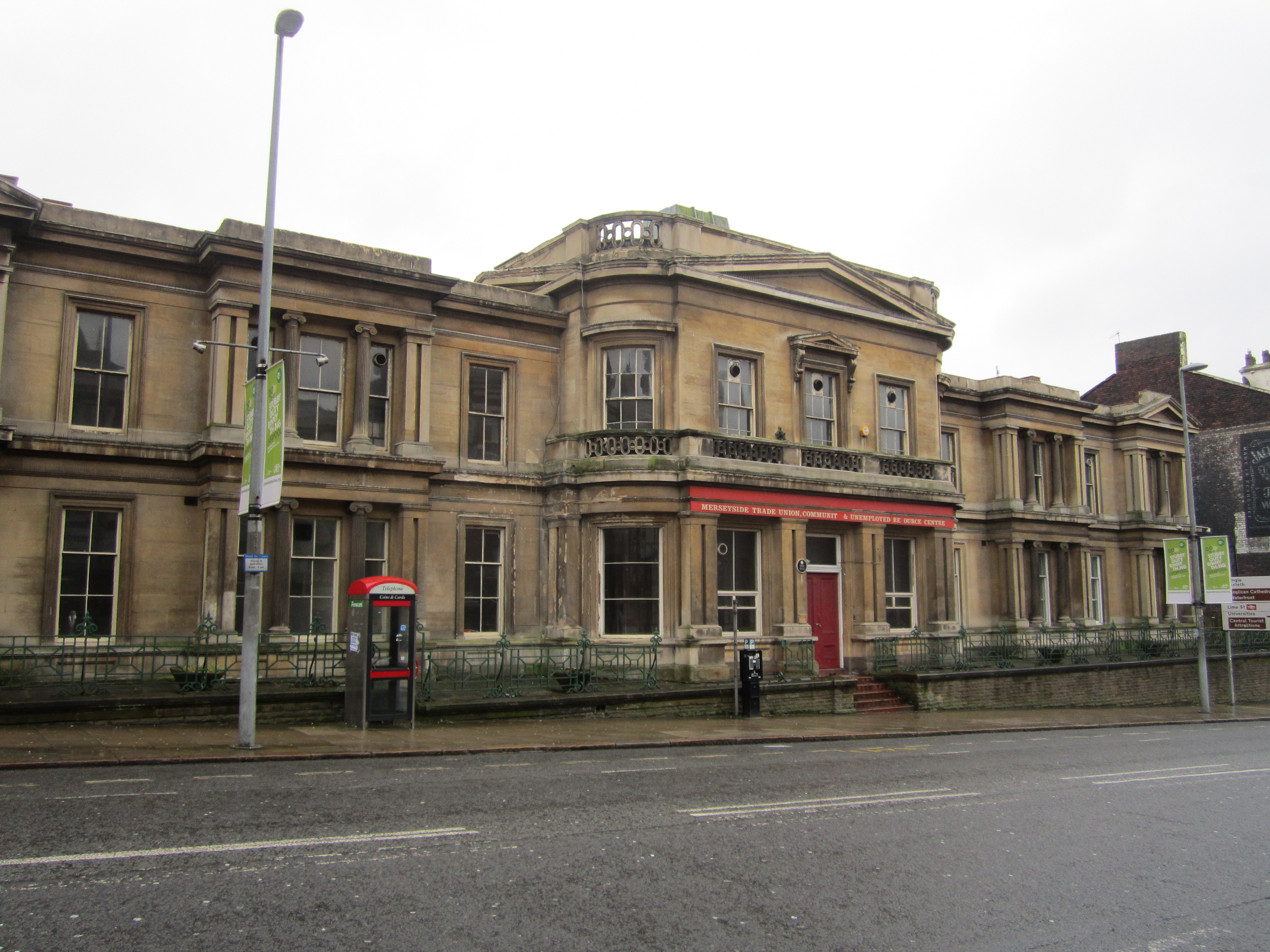
Former Royal School for the Blind, Liverpool, Hardman Street
(1849–51; Grade II)

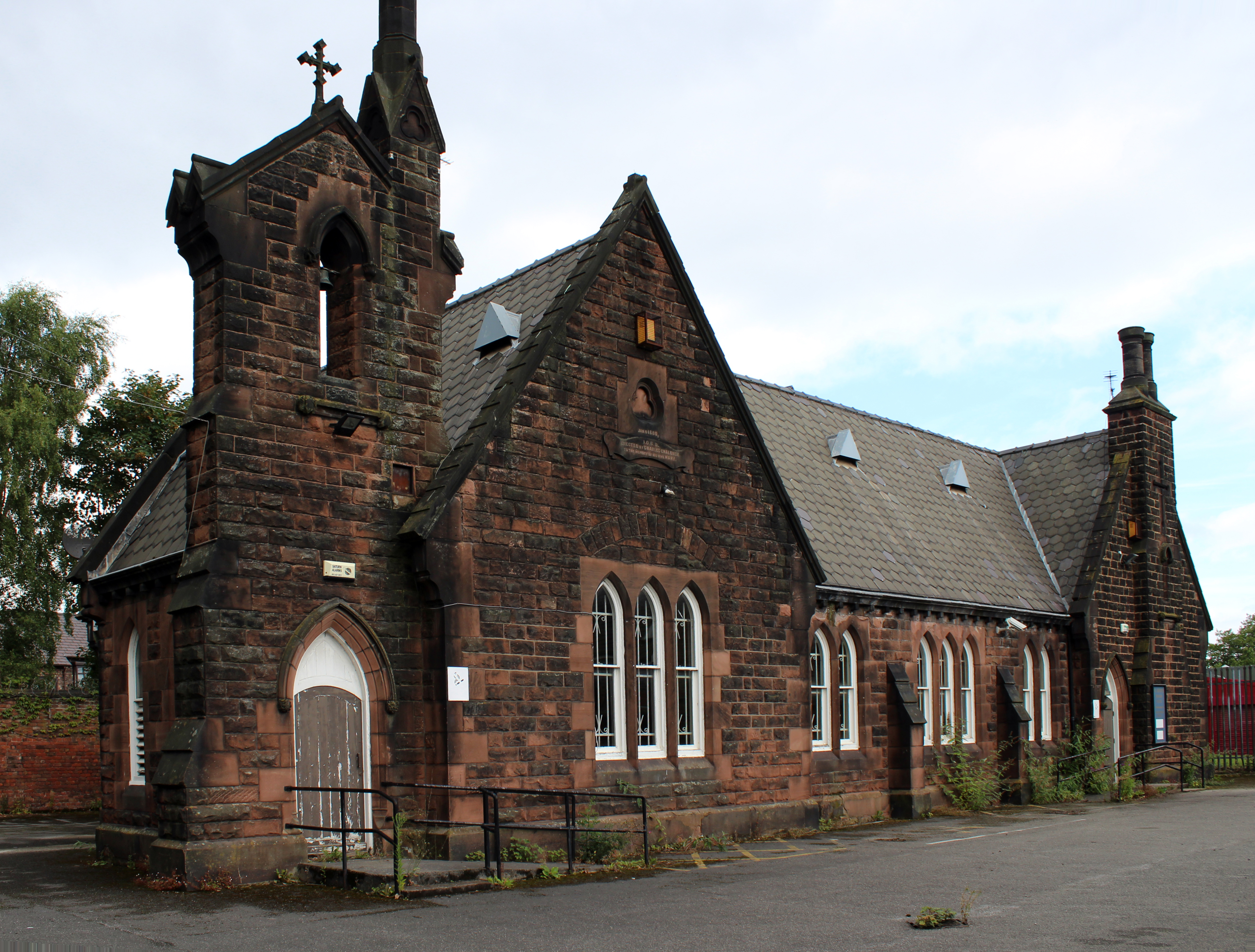
Former St Austin's Roman Catholic school, Aigburth Road, Aigburth
(1860; Grade II)

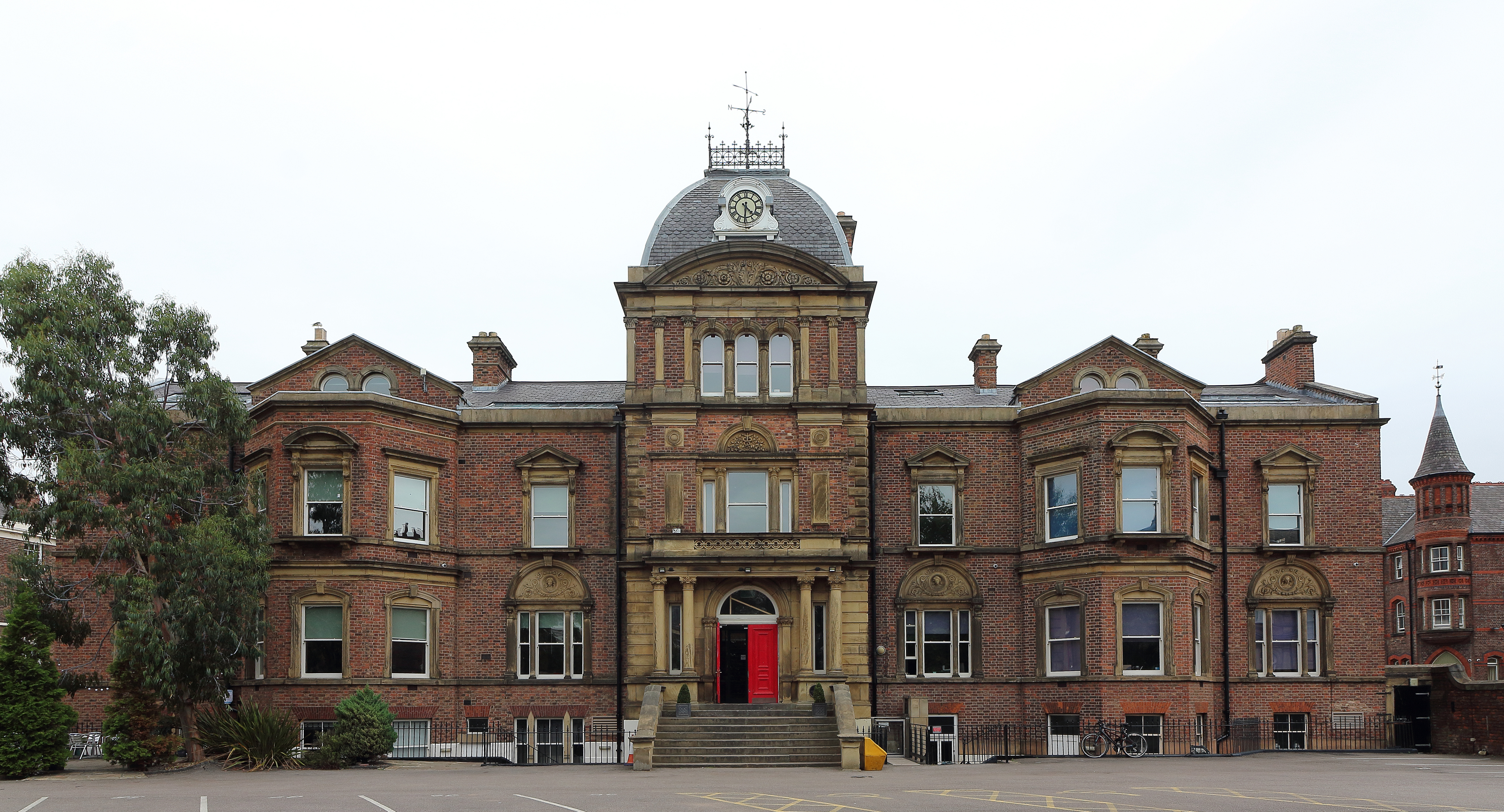
Former Blackburne House Girls' School, Hope Street
(remodelled 1874–76; Grade II)

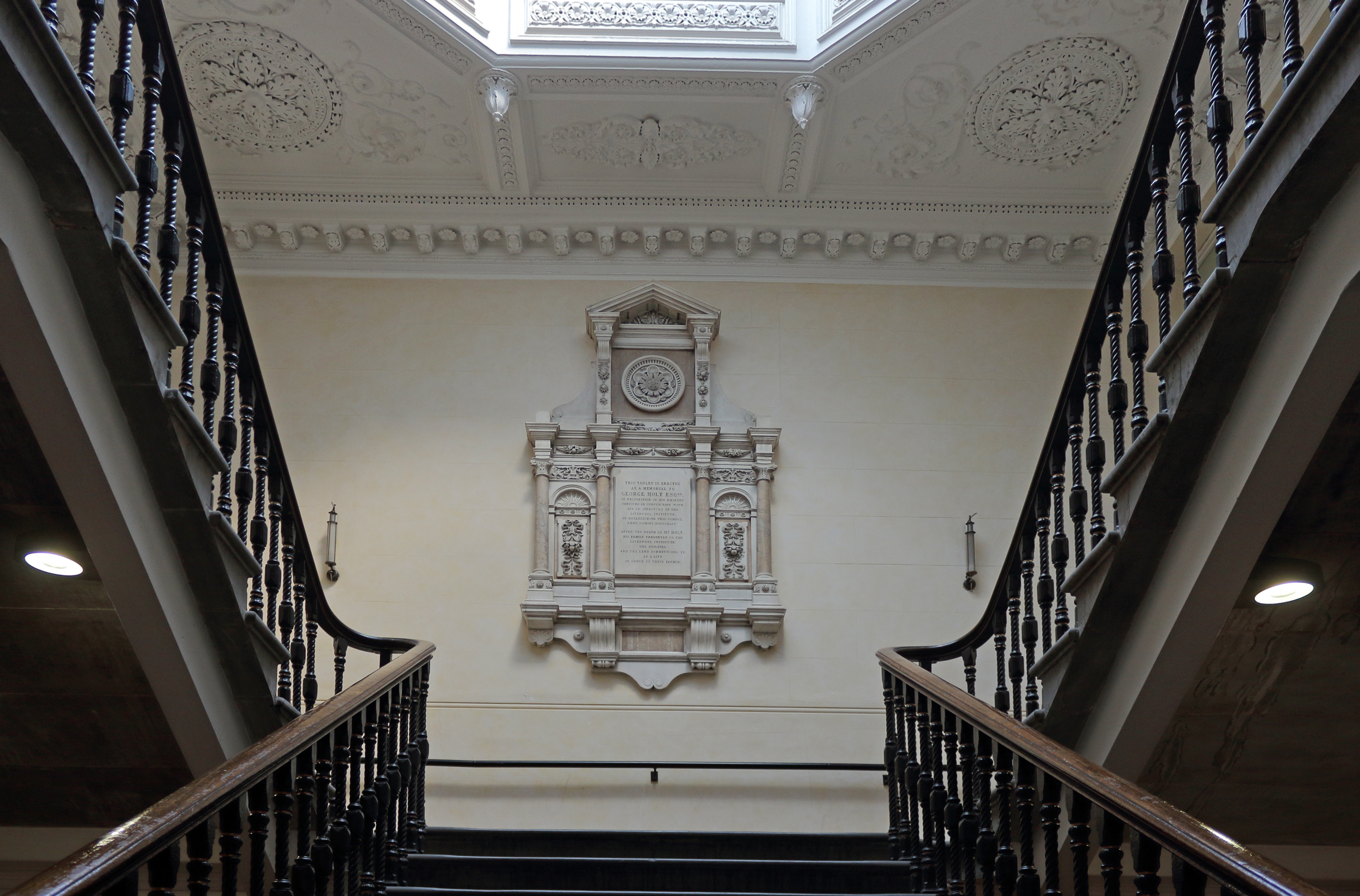
Main staircase, Blackburne House Girls' School, Hope Street
(remodelled 1874–76; Grade II)

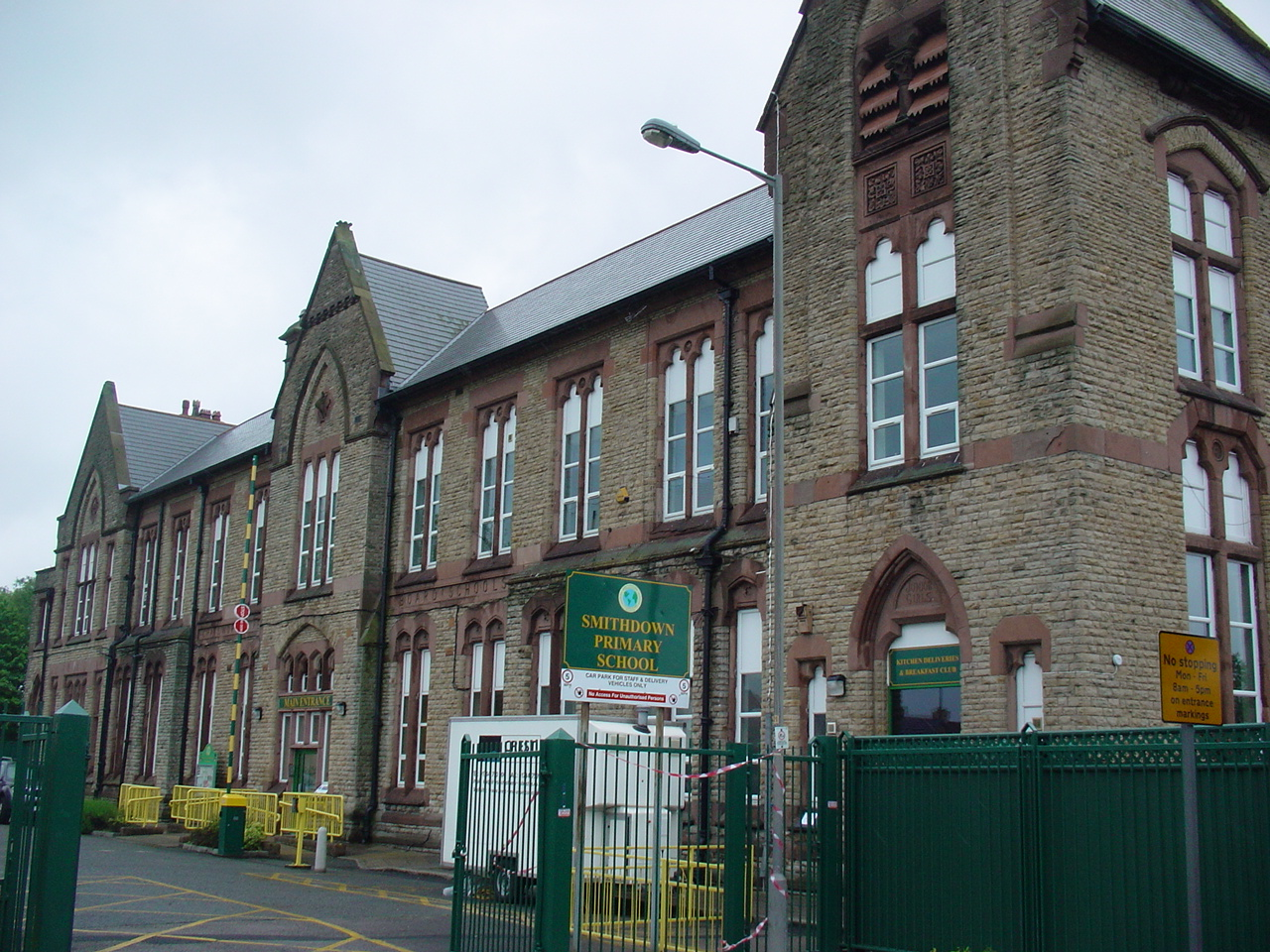
Former Chatsworth School, now Smithdown Primary School, Chatsworth Drive, Edge Hill
(1874; unlisted)

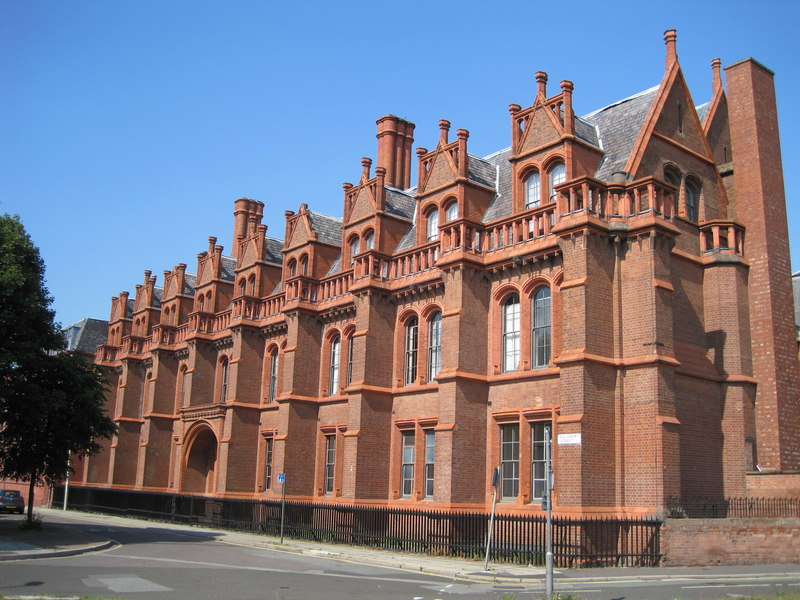
Former St Francis Xaviers College now part of Liverpool Hope University, Salisbury Road
(1877 Grade II)

==== Victorian hospitals and buildings for social care ====
Buildings for health care and social provisions include the Adult Deaf and Dumb Institute now, Merseyside Centre for the Deaf by E.H. Banner in a red brick gothic; the now-demolished Liverpool Sailors' Home provide hospitality and a bed for the night for sailors visiting the city. Hospitals founded in the period include Liverpool Maternity Hospital; founded in 1741 the Liverpool Royal Infirmary underwent vast expansion in the late 1880s. Lunatics were catered for at the now-demolished Lunatic asylum, Rainhill Hospital (1846–51) designed by Harvey Lonsdale Elmes, just outside the city. Workshop for the Outdoor Blind (1870), Cornwallis Street, designed by G.T. Redmayne, provided employment for the blind, who made baskets, matting and brushes. The YMCA building, Mount Pleasant was built (1874–77), l designed in a gothic style by H.H. Vale, it contained a gymnasium, reading room, library, lecture hall and classrooms. Church House (1885), Hanover Street by Walter Aubrey Thomas built to house the Central Institute of the Mersey Mission to Seaman and a temperance public house; The former Eye and Ear Hospital (1878–80), Myrtle Street by C.O. Ellison, in an old English style, also in Myrtle Street and by C.O. Ellison is the former Sheltering Home for Destitute Children (1888–89). The former Liverpool Homeopathic Hospital (1887) was designed by F & G Holme in the French Renaissance architecture style. The Florence Institute (1889) is the oldest surviving purpose-built boys' club in Britain, probably designed by H.W. Keef, paid for by merchant Bernard Hall. The Gordon Smith Institute for Seaman (1899) by James Strong of Walker & Strong, in Paradise Street, was created to provide seamen with a library, reading room and assembly hall. Former Eye and Ear Hospital, 3–5 Myrtle Street, was designed by C.O. Ellsion. The former Walton Workhouse (1864–68) was designed by William Culshaw. The New Hall complex (1887–89), Longmoor Lane, Fazakerley, designed by Charles H. Lancaster, was built as cottages to house deprived children, the group of cottages is terminated by a monumental hall with a clock tower.

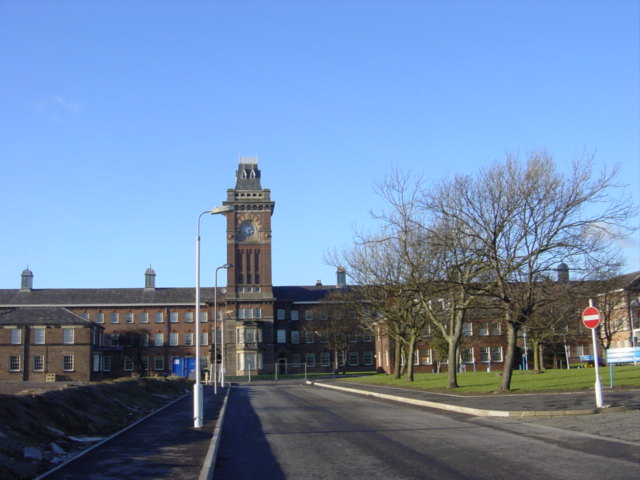
Former Walton Workhouse, Rice Lane, Walton
(remodelled 1864–68; Grade II)

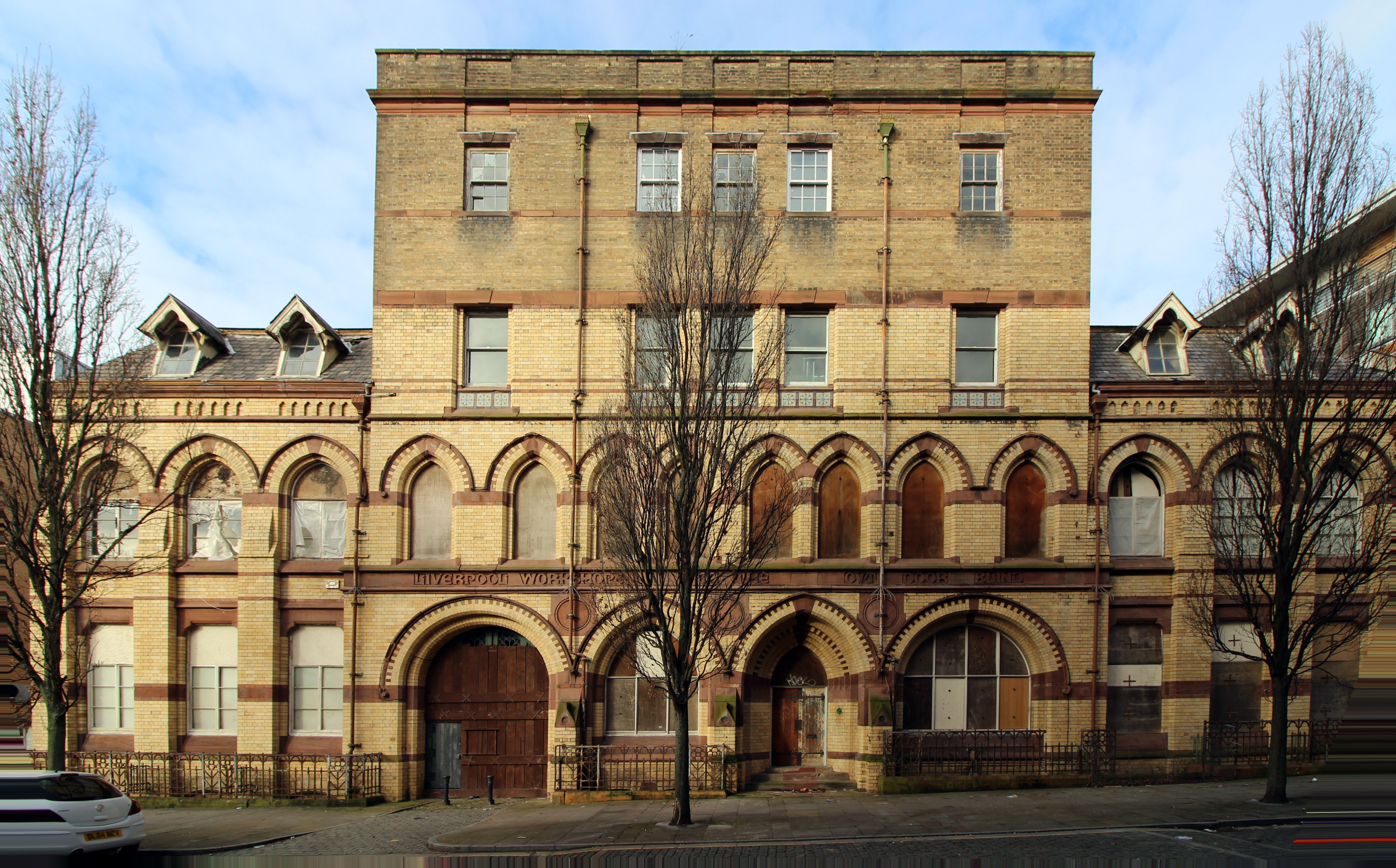
Workshop for the Outdoor Blind, Cornwallis Street
(1870; unlisted)

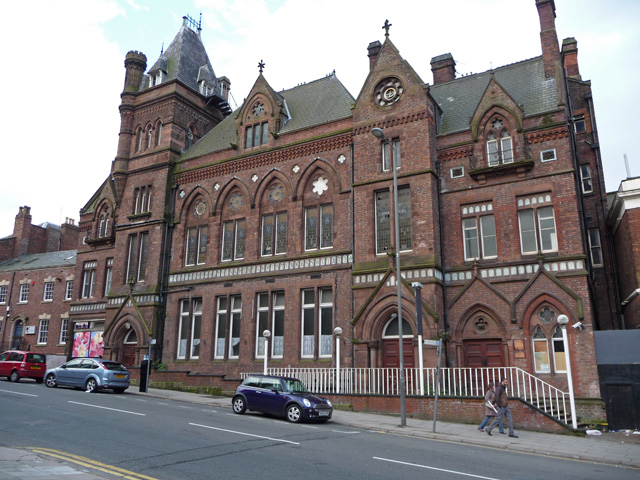
YMCA, Mount Pleasant
(1874–77; Grade II)

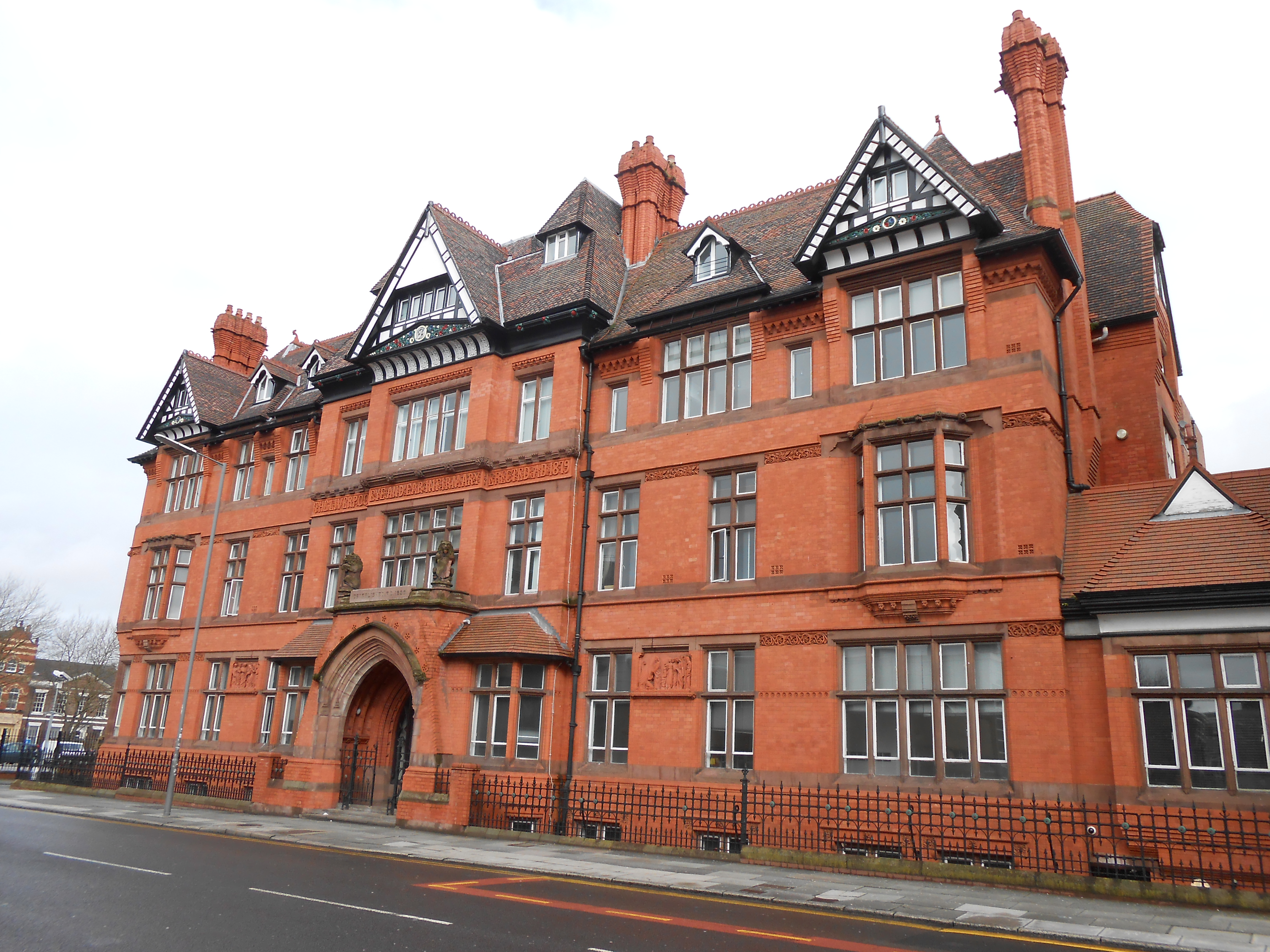
Former Eye and Ear Hospital, 3-5 Myrtle Street
(1878–80; Grade II)

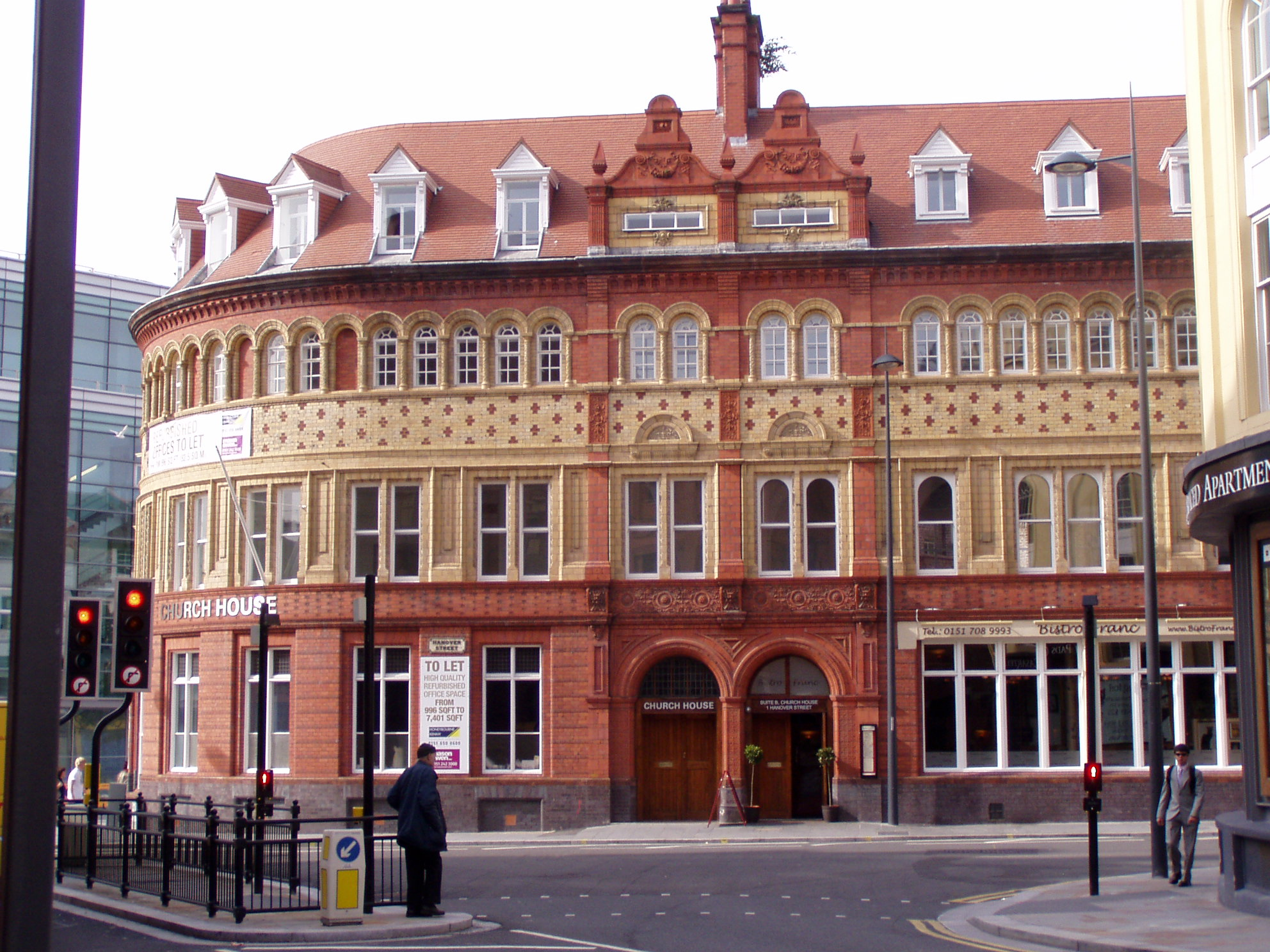
Church House, Hanover Street
(1885; Grade II)

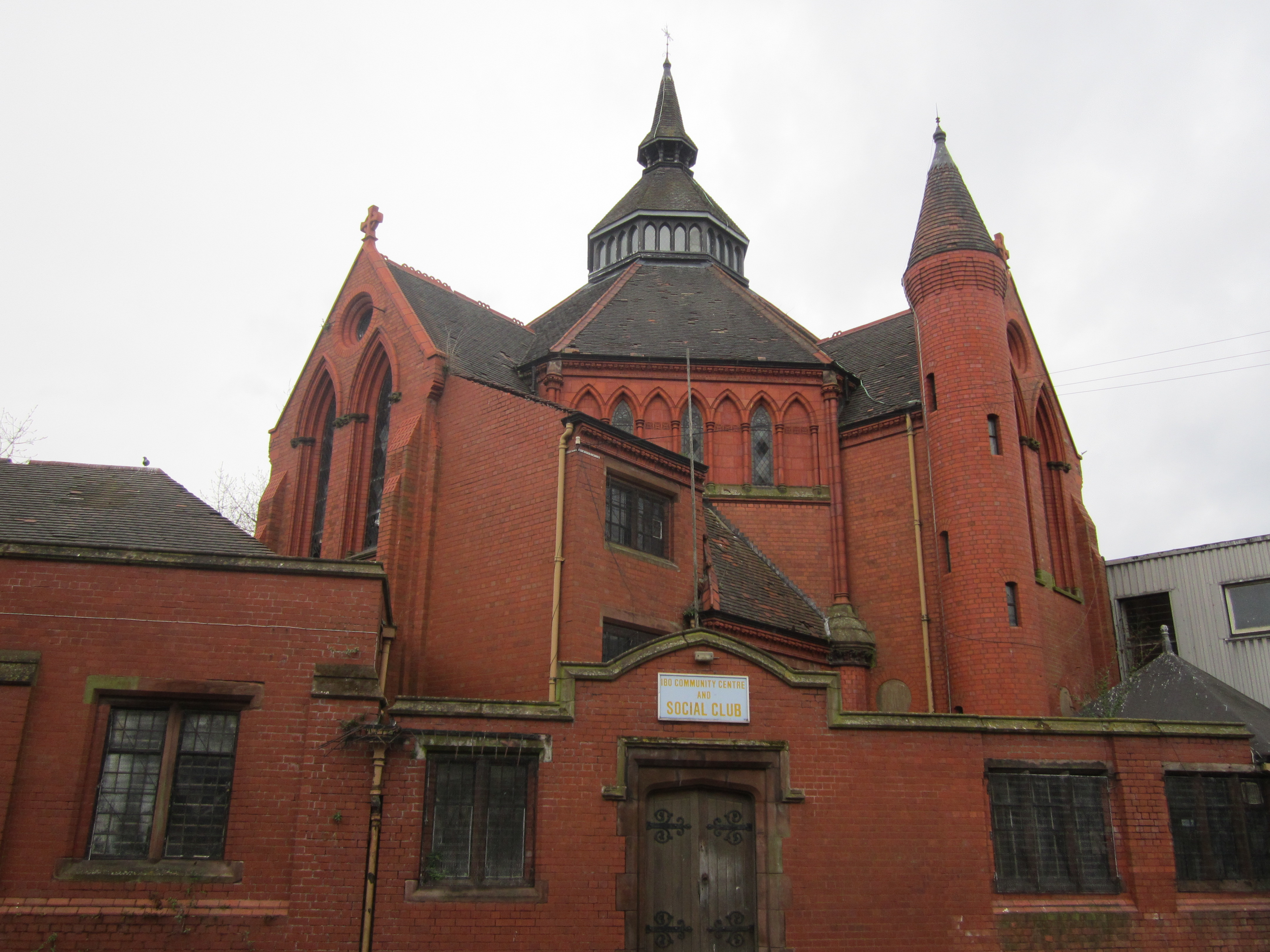
The Adult Deaf and Dumb Institute, Park Way
(1886–87; Grade II)

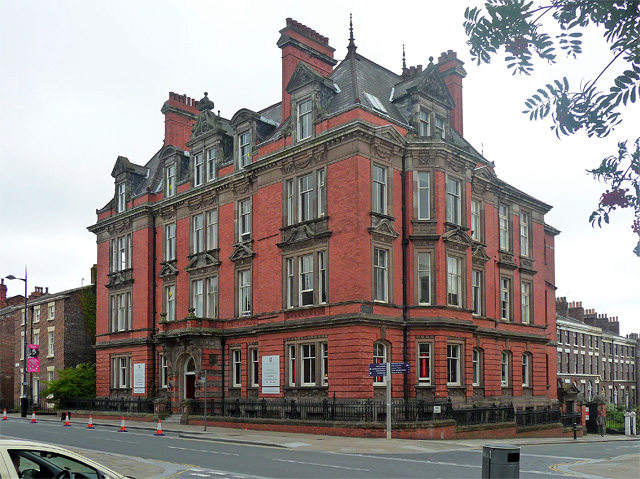
Former Hahnemann Homoeopathic Hospital, Hope Street
(1887; Grade II)

=== Victorian public buildings ===
Many public buildings of the era survive in central Liverpool. The major public building of the mid-Victorian age was Municipal Buildings (now a hotel) started in 1860 by Liverpool Corporation surveyor John Weightman (not to be confused with his near-contemporary John Grey Weightman), and finished in 1866 by his successor as surveyor E.R. Robson, who amended the design. The style is a mixture of Italianate architecture and French Renaissance, the latter style is evident in the elaborate roofs of the building. The building function as municipal offices to house the growing council workforce. Most of the grand public buildings in the centre of Liverpool were in the Neoclassical style, so are dealt with in the dedicated section above. Weightman also designed the Main Bridewell and the Magistrates' Courts. The partially surviving old General Post Office (1894–97), in Victoria Street, was designed by Henry Tanner. The former offices for the city's Education Department (1897–98), Sir Thomas Street by Charles E. Deacon survives. The Old Bridewell police station, Campbell Square, was built (1861). Thomas Shelmerdine designed the Central Fire Station that was opened in 1897, also at the end of the 19th century he remodelled the council chamber in the Town Hall.

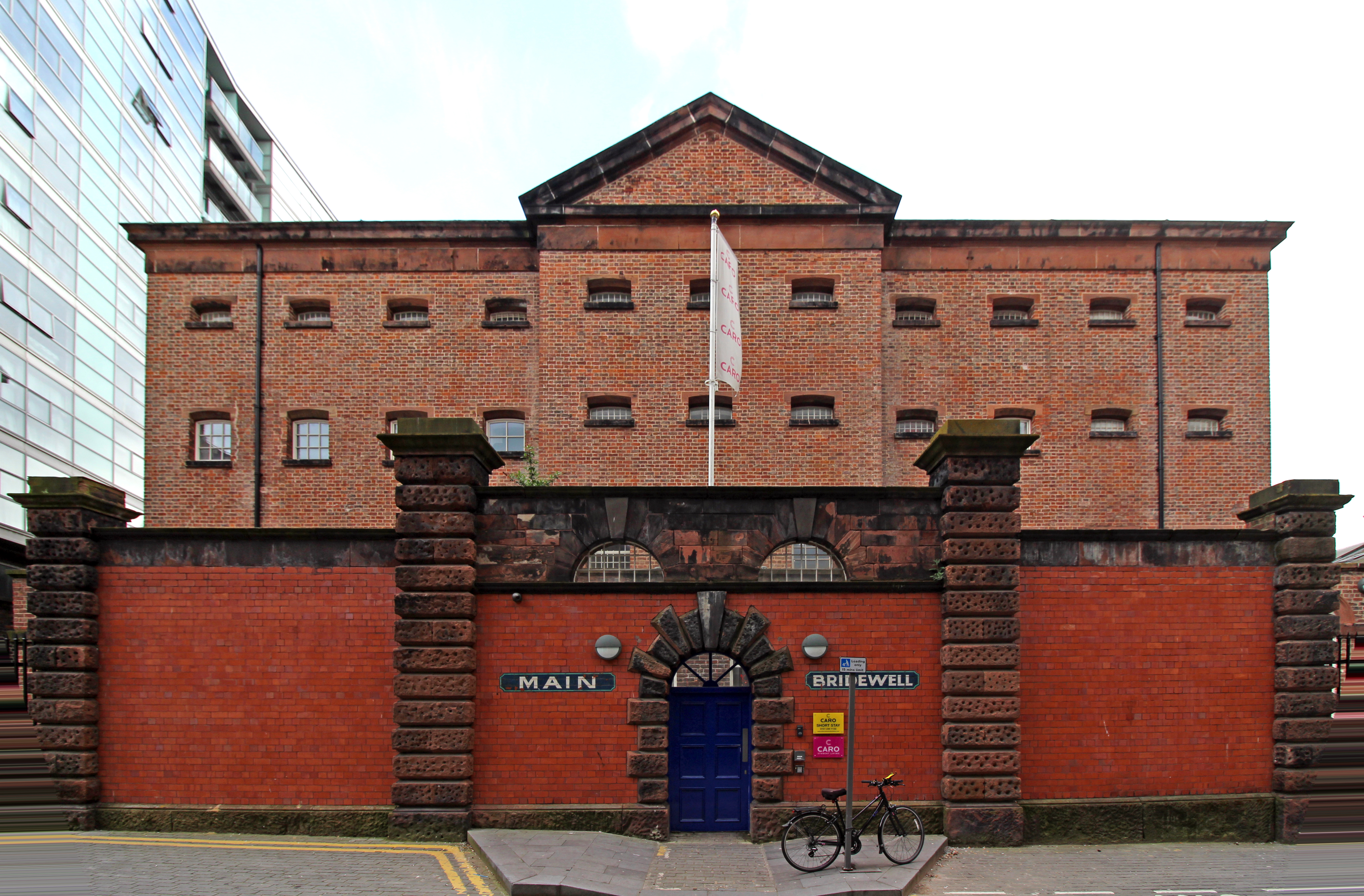
Main Bridewell, Cheapside
(1857–59; Grade II*)

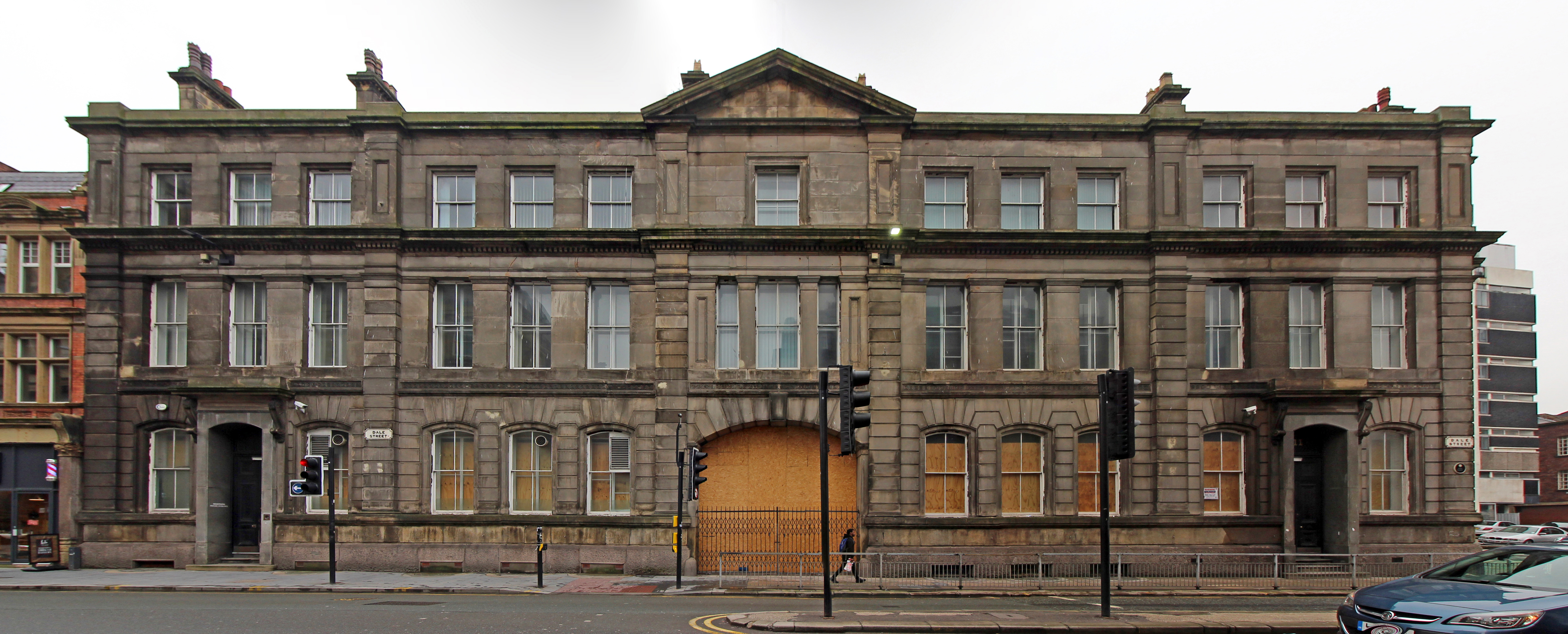
Former Magistrates' Courts, Dale Street
(1857–59; Grade II)

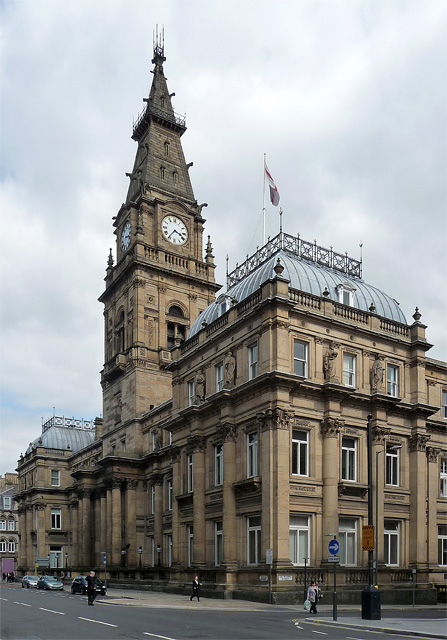
Municipal Buildings, Dale Street
(1860–66; Grade II*)

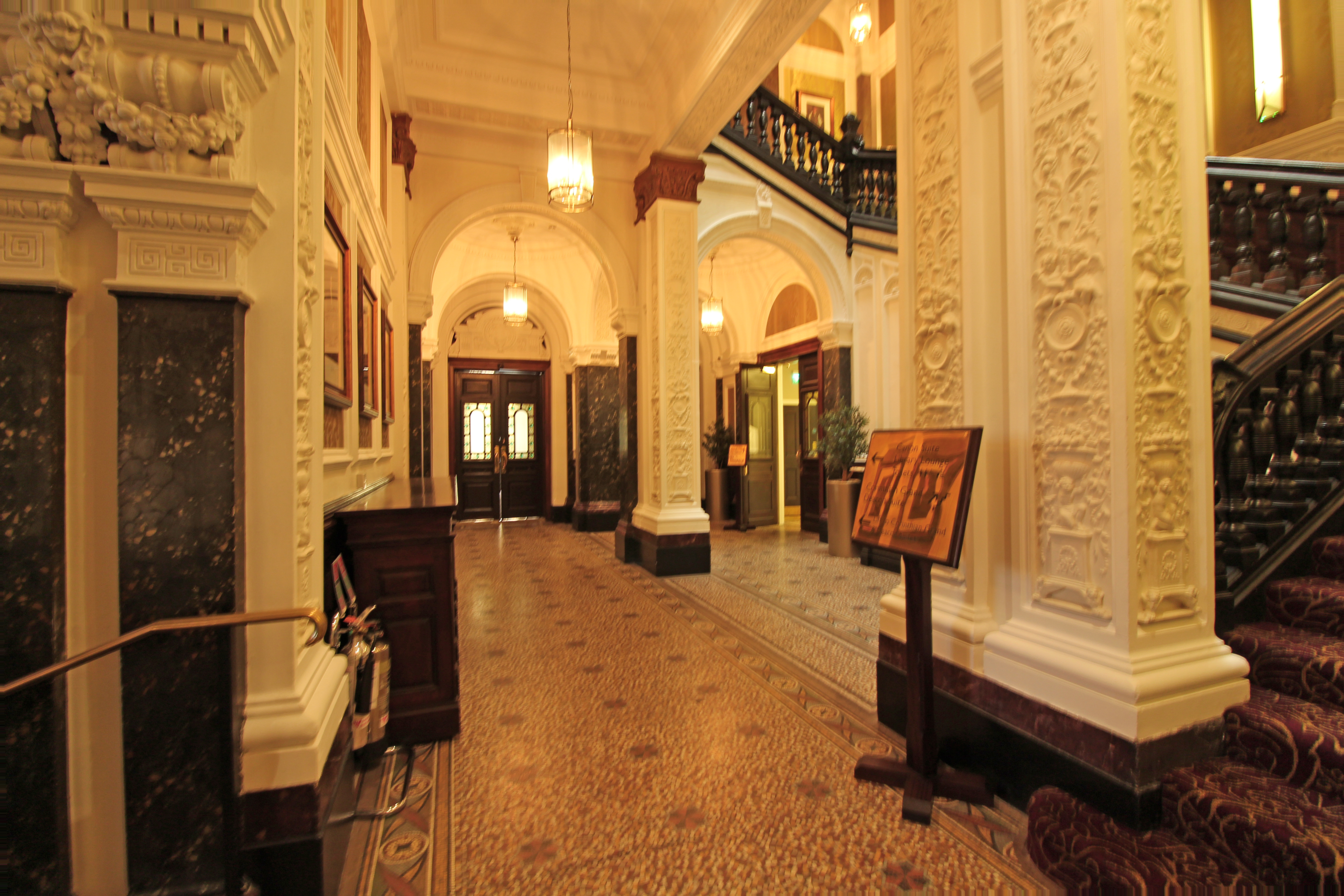
Hallway, Municipal Buildings, Dale Street
(1860–66; Grade II*)

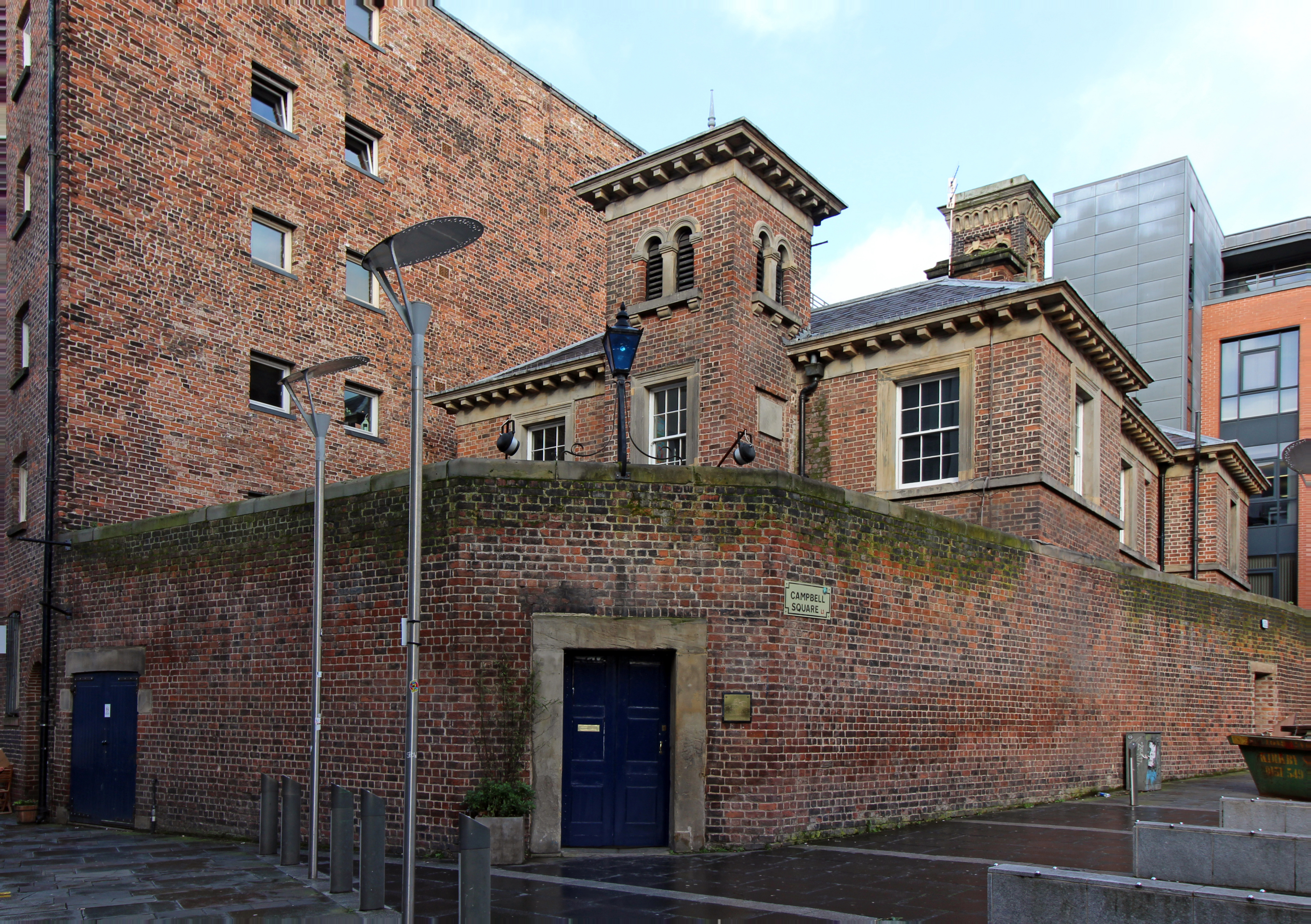
Old Bridewell Police Station, Campbell Square
(1861; Grade II)

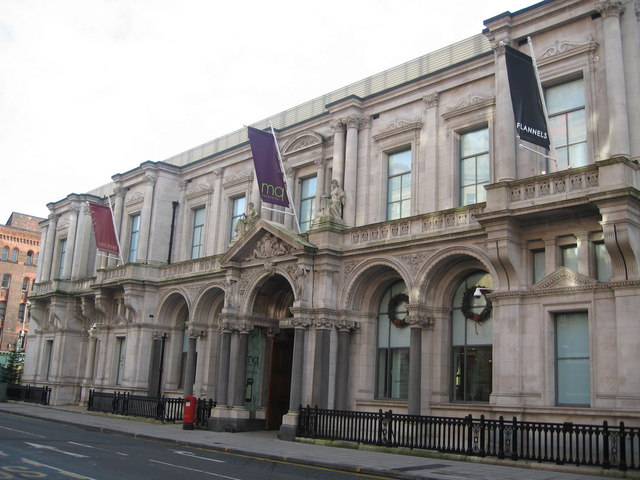
Old General Post Office Building, Victoria St (upper floors bombed in blitz)
(1894–97; unlisted)

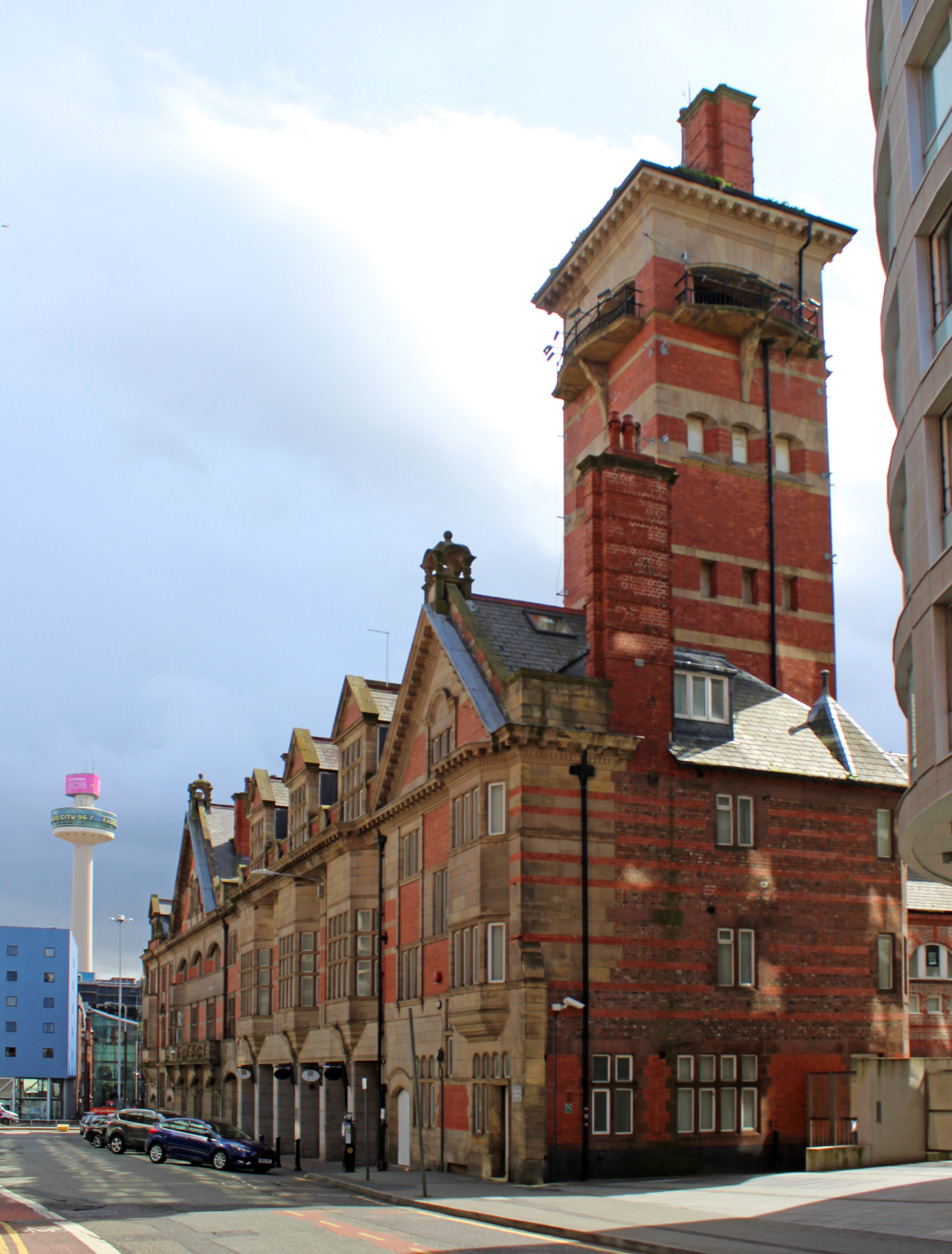
Former Central Fire Station, Hatton Garden
(1897; Grade II)

Several Victorian public buildings survive in the suburbs. John Weightman designed Walton Gaol that was constructed between 1848 and 1855, the gatehouse and chapel are in Neo-Norman style. Also in Walton are the former School Board Offices (c.1890) by Edmund Kirkby. The Public Offices in Toxteth (1865–66) are in Italianate style by Thomas Layland. The Cross, West Derby Village, was designed by William Eden Nesfield and carved by James Forsyth. The Picton Clock Tower of 1884 was designed and paid for by James Picton as a memorial to his wife. There are several former Victorian Police Stations around the city, including the one in Lark Lane (1885) by F.U. Holme; Rice Lane, Walton; Old Swan, Derby Road, Tue Brook now flats; in Durning Road, Edge Hill is a combined police and fire station, mid-19th century, in a Tudor Gothic style; The former Police and Fire Station, Westminster Road, Kirkdale, by city surveyor Thomas Shelmerdine. The Gregson Memorial Institute, Garmoyle Road, Wavertree, was a privately funded library and museum designed by A.P. Fry, the collections have been dispersed.

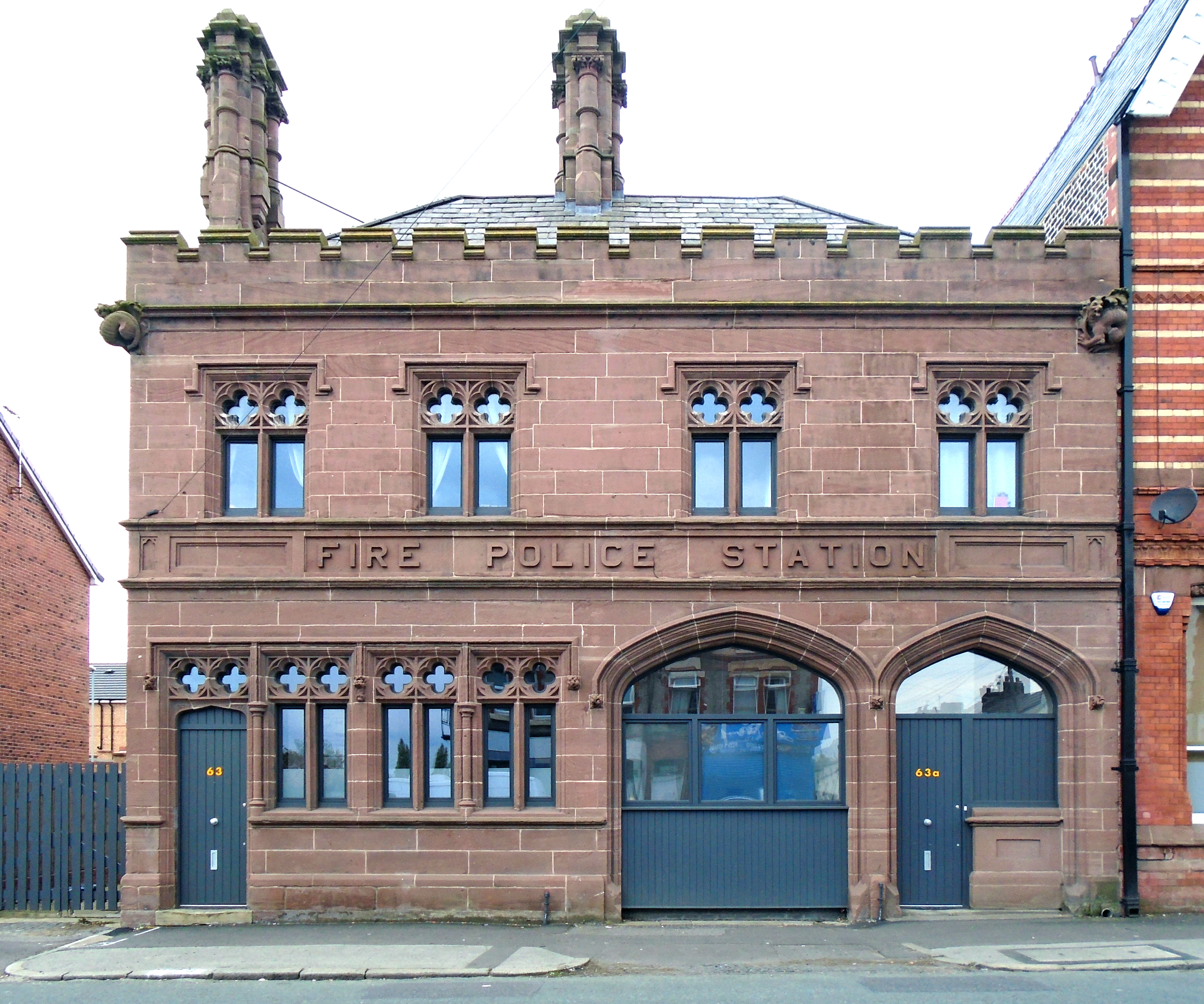
Former Fire and Police Station, Durning Road, Edge Hill
(mid 19th century; unlisted)

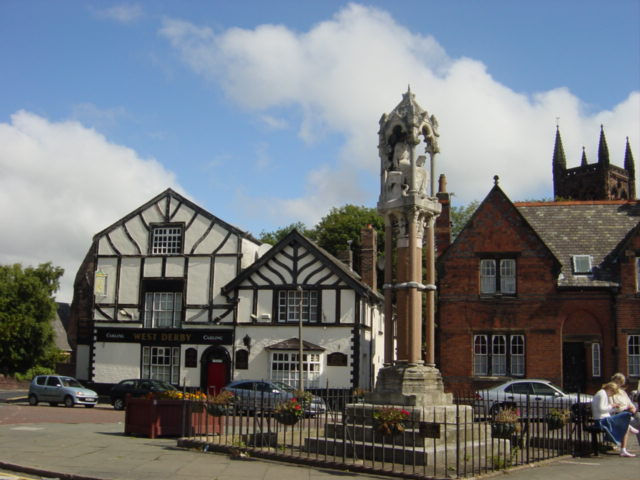
The Cross, West Derby Village
(c.1861-70; Grade II)

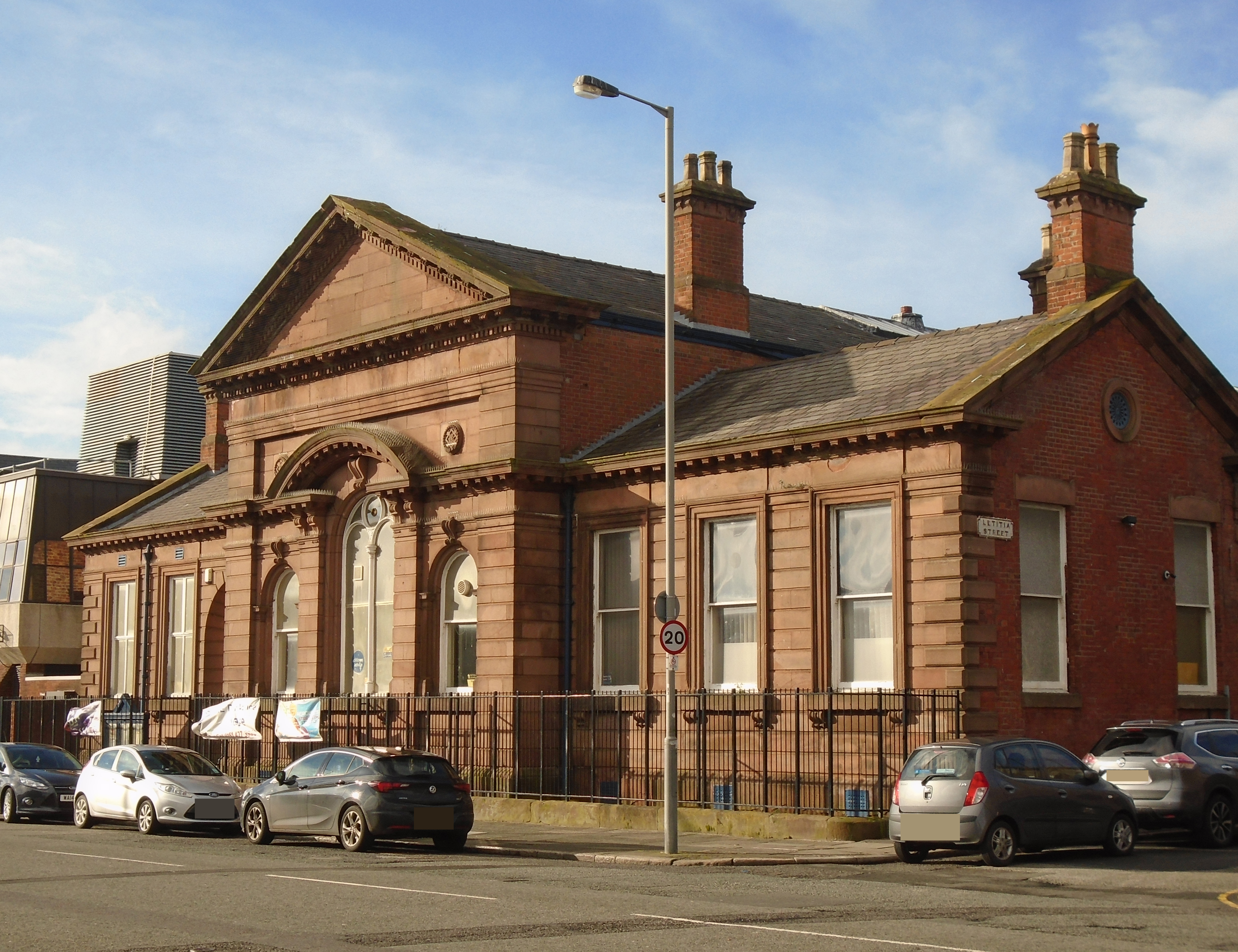
Public Offices Toxteth, High Park Street
(1865–66; Grade II)

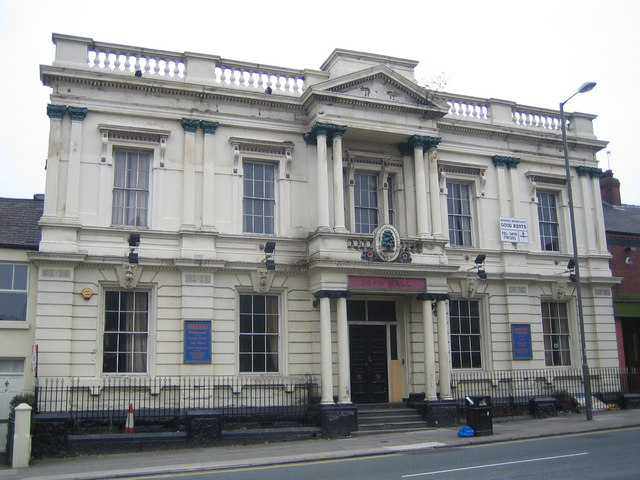
Former Wavertree Town Hall, High Street (Wavertree became part of Liverpool in 1895)
(1872; Grade II)

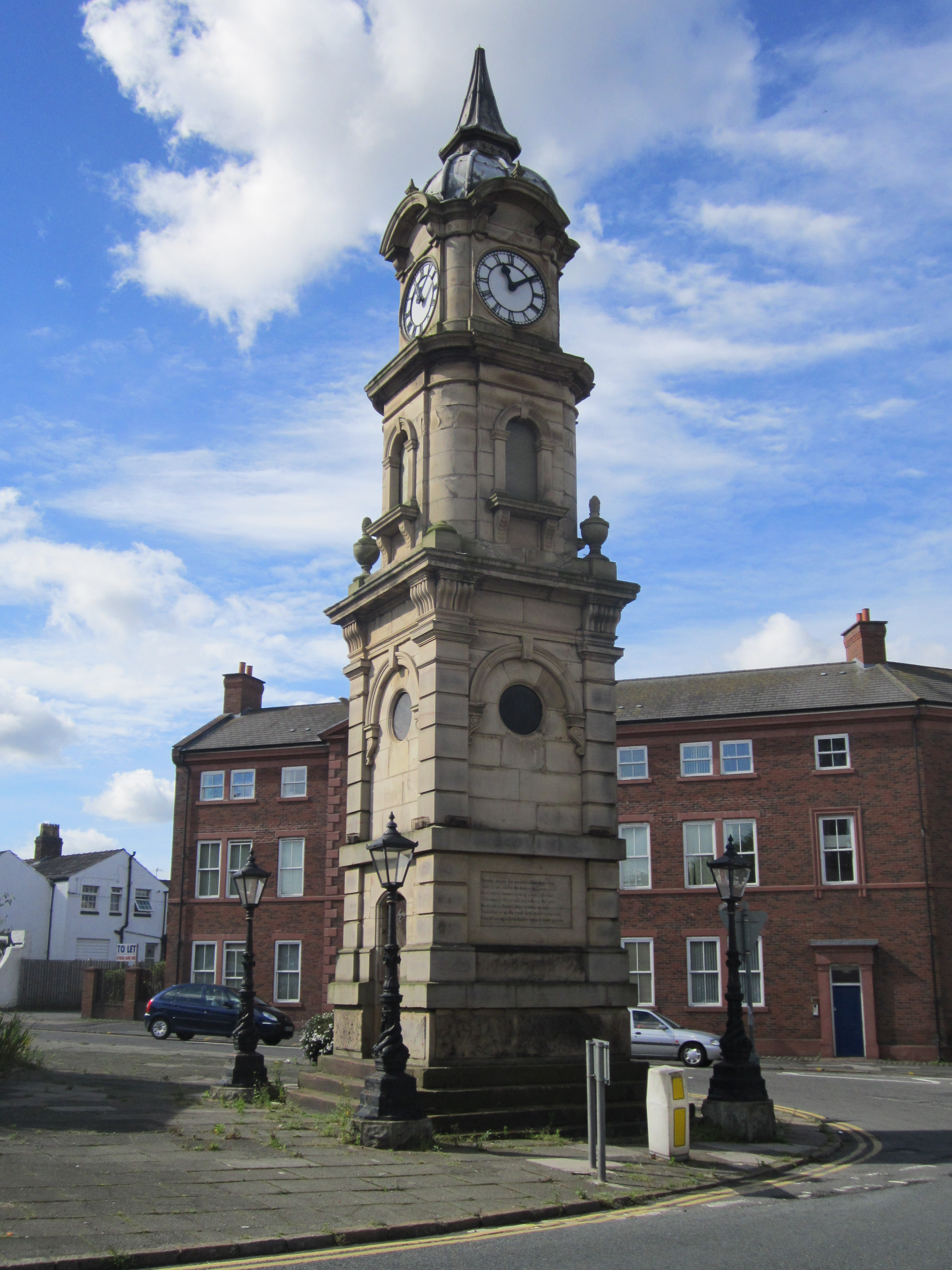
Picton Clock Tower, High Street, Wavertree
(1884; Grade II)

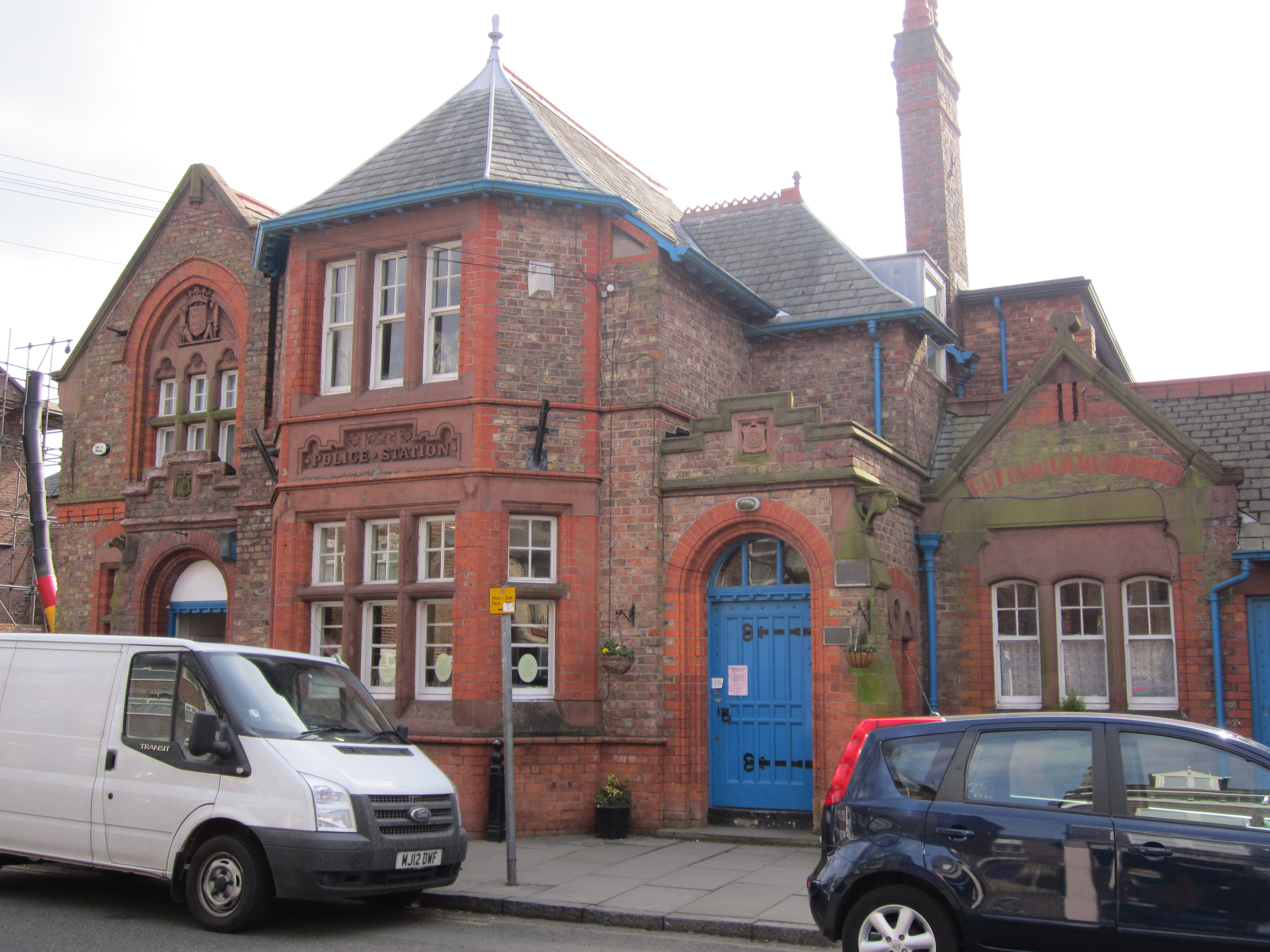
Old Police Station, Lark Lane, Sefton Park
(1885; unlisted)

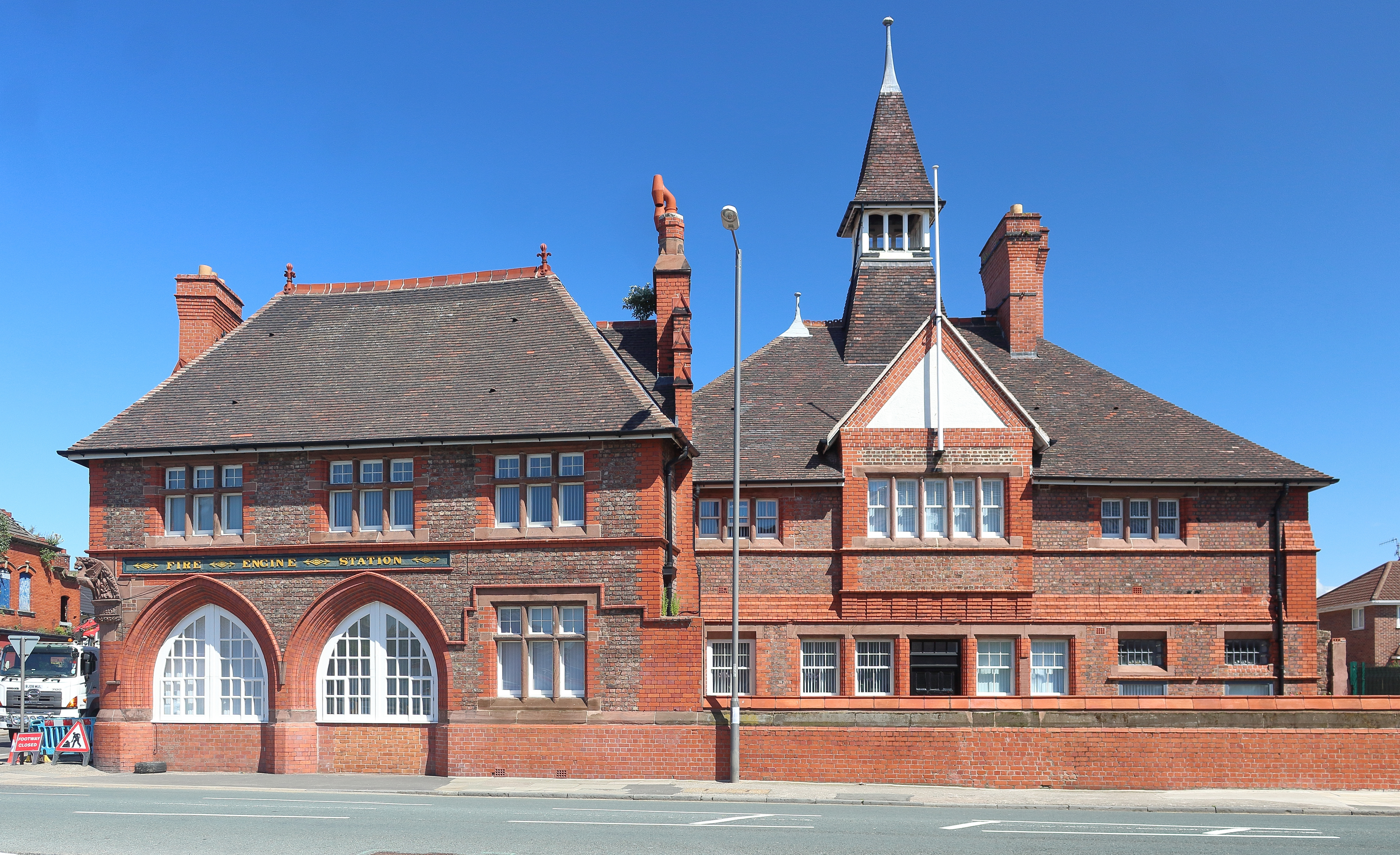
Former Police and Fire Station, Westminster Road, Kirkdale
(1885; Grade II)

=== Alfred Waterhouse ===
Born Stone Hill, Liverpool 19 July 1830, but grew up in Aigburth, architect Alfred Waterhouse established his architectural practice first in Manchester in 1854 and from 1865 in London. He achieved national fame for a large number of mostly institutional, commercial and educational buildings throughout England, his best-known buildings being Manchester Town Hall and the Natural History Museum, London. He also designed several structures for his home city. Including the University of Liverpool's Victoria Building, completed in (1889–92). Waterhouse's use of striking red brick and Burmantofts terracotta as building materials for its exterior and tiles inside inspired Edgar Allison Peers, a Spanish professor at Liverpool, to coin the term "Red Brick University" and to then apply it collectively to six recently founded institutions of higher education in some of the major industrial cities of England. Waterhouse designed other buildings for the university including the Chemical Laboratories (1884–87); the Walker Engineering Block (1887–91), the Gossage Chemical Laboratories (1895–97), the Medical School (1895–97), the Thompson Yates Laboratories (1895–98) and one final work for the university was a joint work with his son Paul Waterhouse for the Medical School, the Whelan Building (1899–1904) that housed the Anatomy Department. Other important Waterhouse complexes are the Liverpool Royal Infirmary (1886–92) and Newsham Park Hospital (1870–75) built as The Liverpool Seamen's Orphan Institution. Waterhouse also designed the Great North Western Hotel (1871) in French renaissance style, that served Liverpool Lime Street railway station. He also designed Prudential Assurance Building, Liverpool (1885–86), he designed several office buildings for The Prudential Assurance company throughout Britain in the same style. He also designed the Pearl Assurance building, now known as St John's House. A smaller commission was the Turner Home, Liverpool. Waterhouse also designed three large Gothic houses in the city: the first is New Heys (1861–65) for lawyer W.G. Bateson, Allerton Road; then Allerton Priory (1866–75) and its entrance Lodge for colliery owner John Grant Morris and Mossley Hill House (1869–72), Park Avenue, for general broker Lloyd Rayner, it is now part of Mossley Hill Hospital.

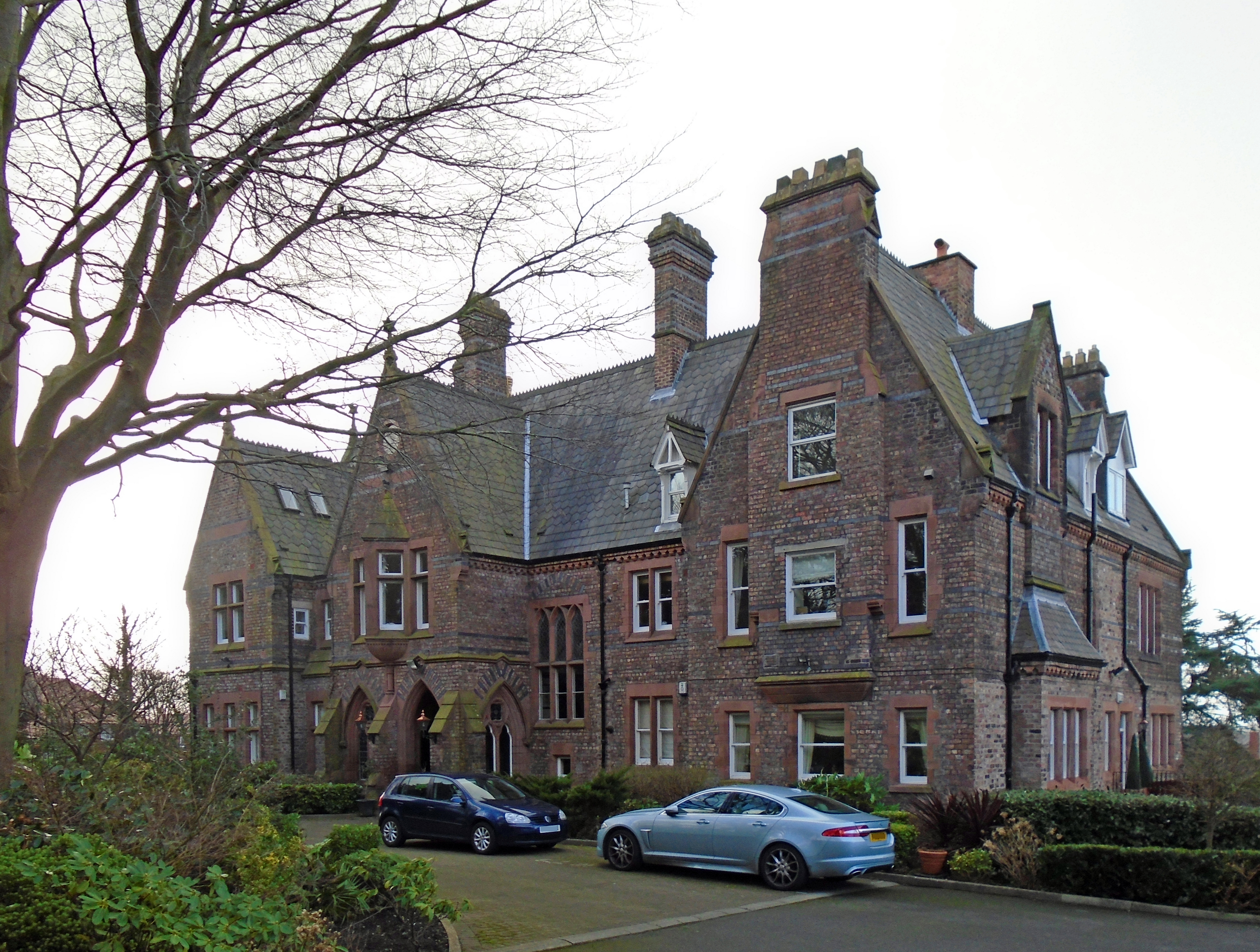
New Heys, New Heys Drive, Allerton
(1861–65; Grade II)

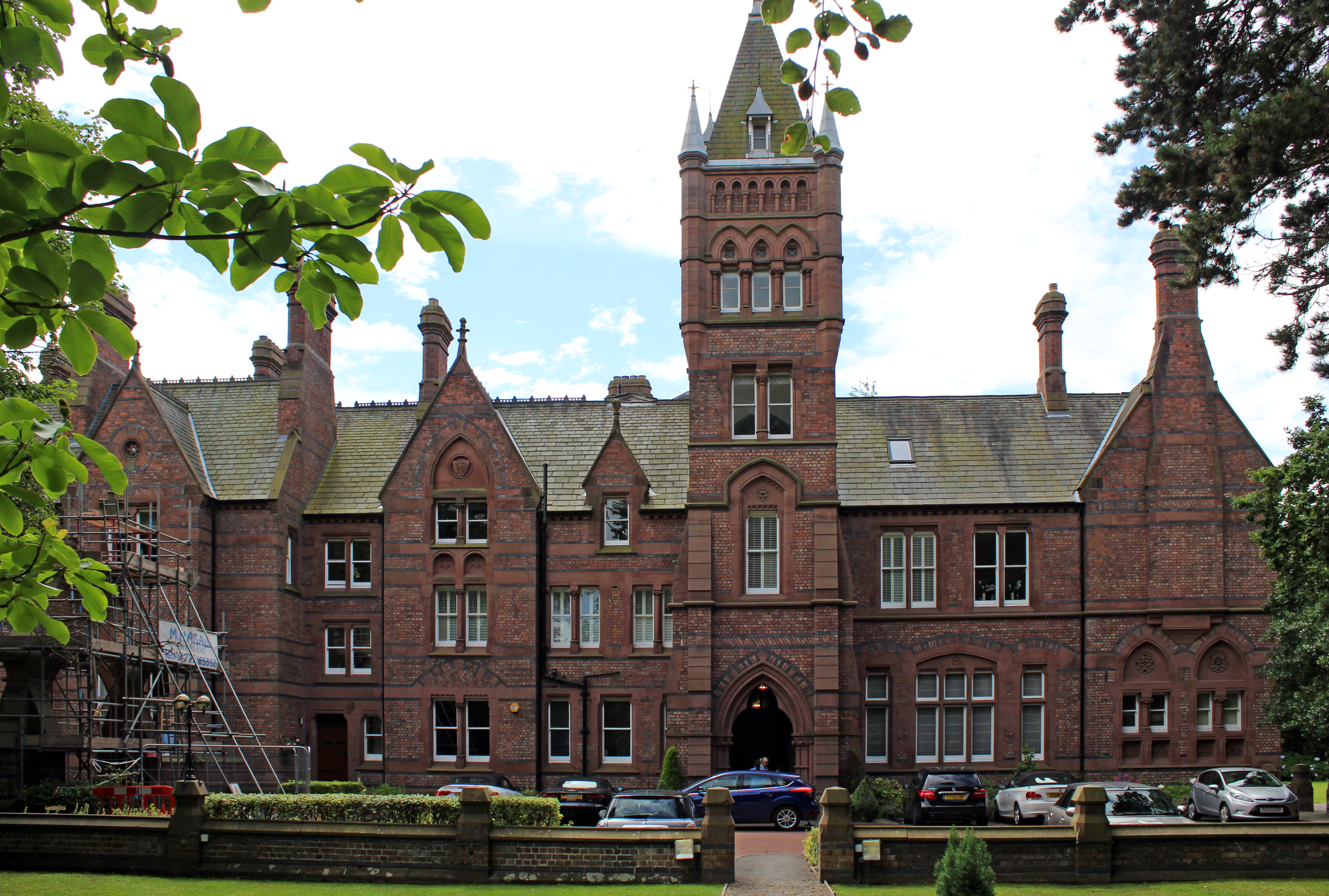
Allerton Priory
(1866–75; Grade II*)

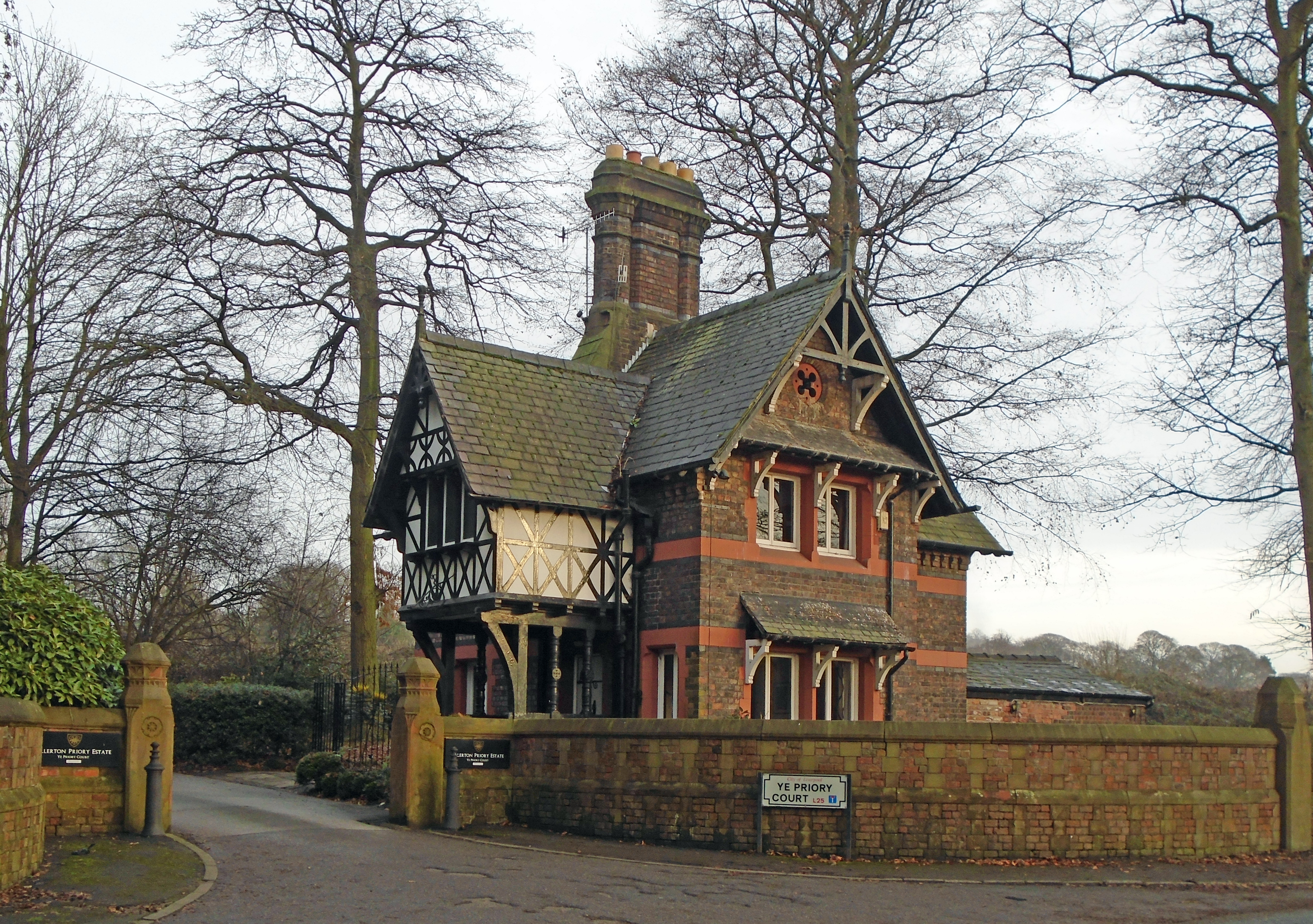
Lodge to Allerton Priory, Allerton Road, Allerton
(1867–70; Grade II)

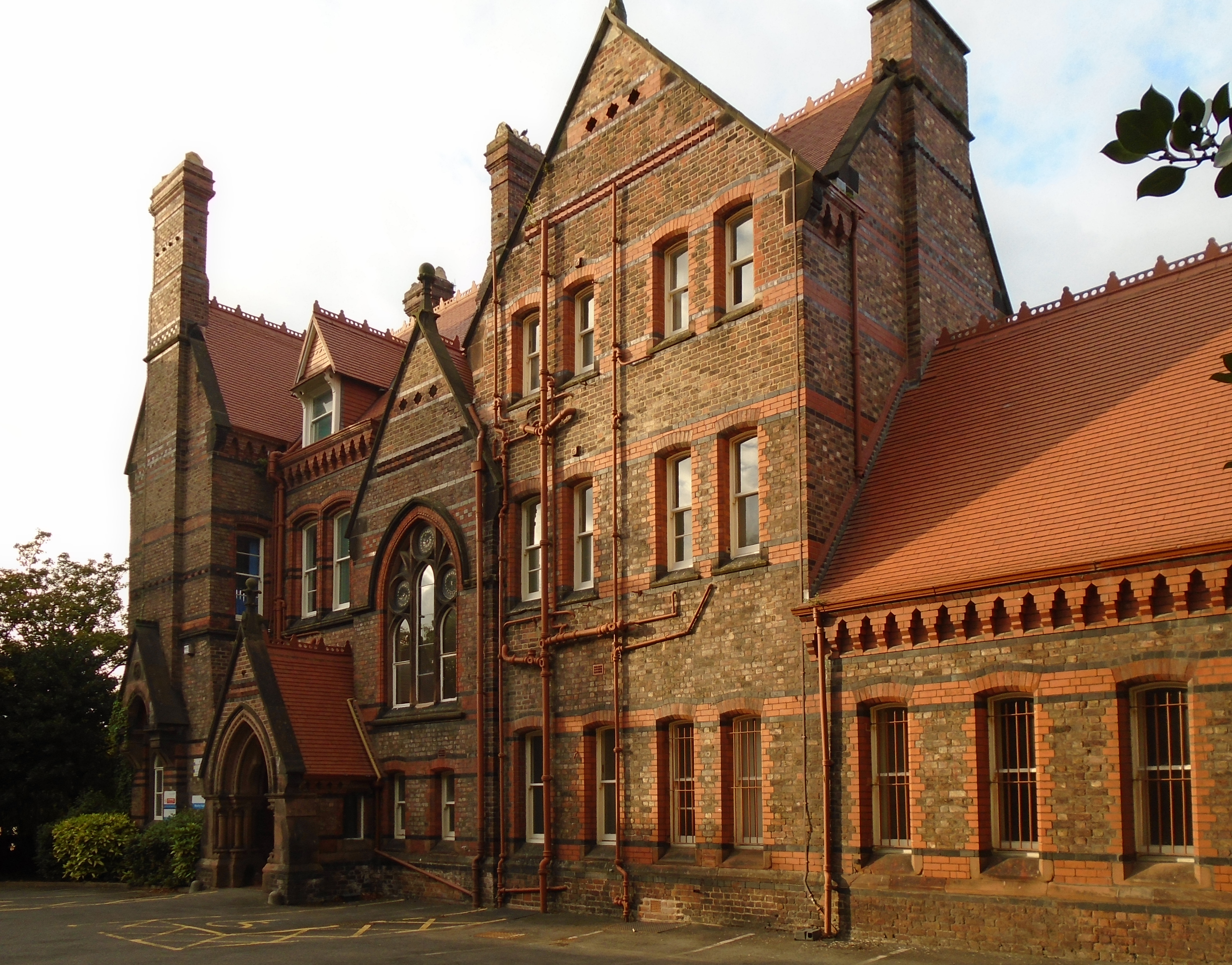
Mossley Hill House, Park Avenue
(1868–69; Grade II)

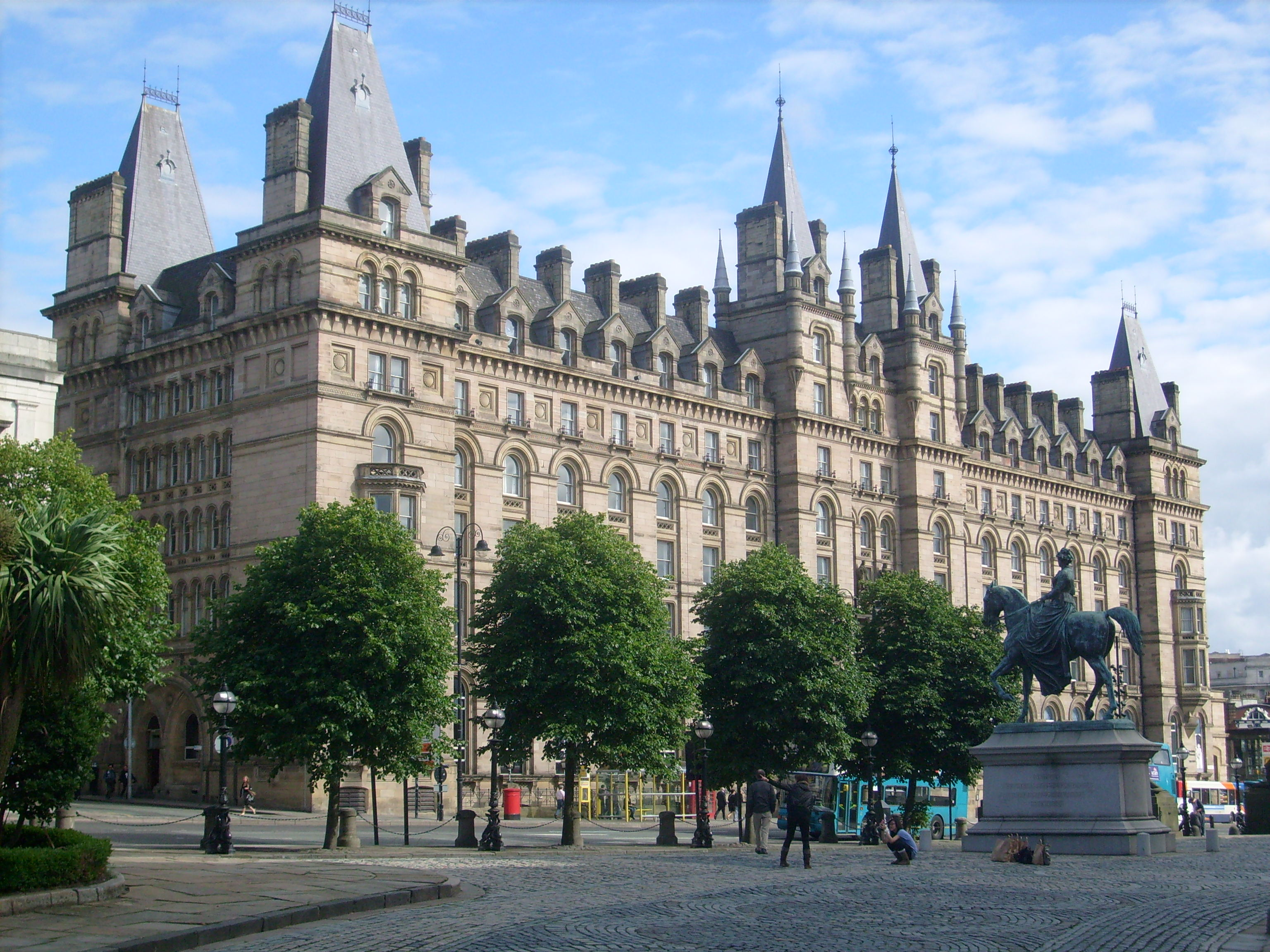
Great North Western Hotel
Lime Street
(1868–71; Grade II)

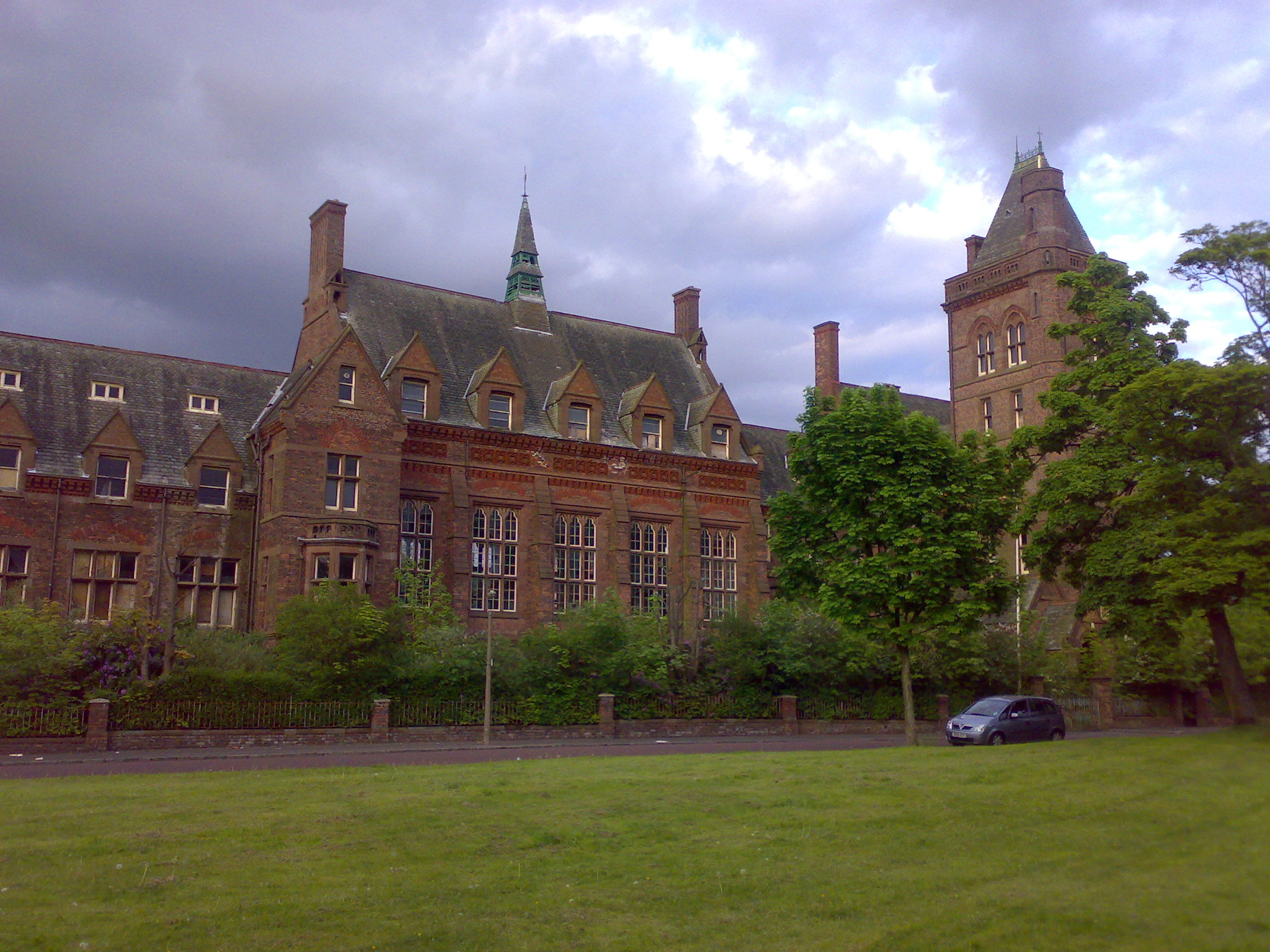
The Liverpool Seamen's Orphan Institution, Orphan Drive, Fairfield
(1870–75; Grade II)

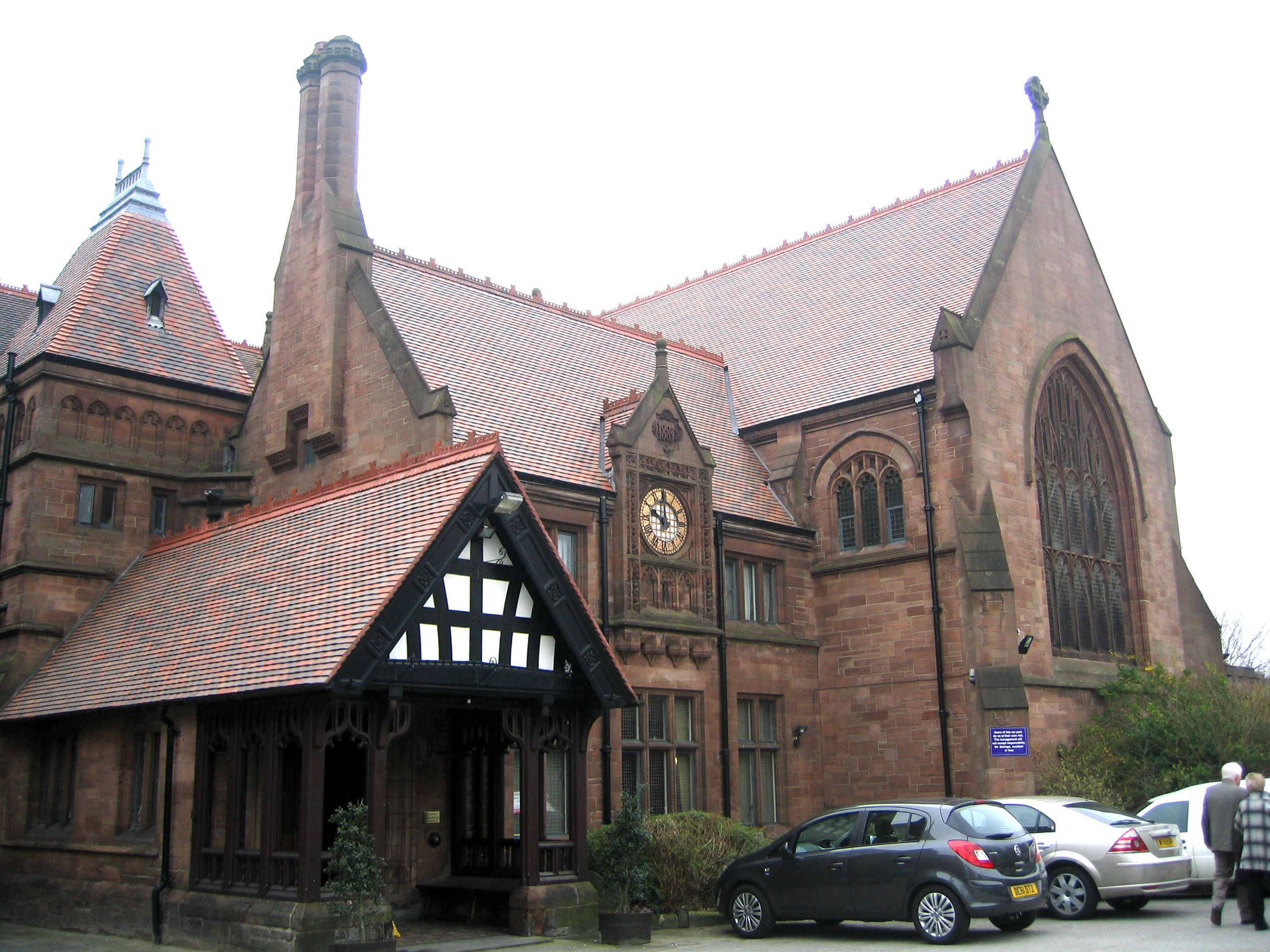
Turner Memorial Home, Dingle Lane, Toxteth
(1881–83; Grade II)

=== Victorian places of worship ===
As Liverpool grew so the need grew for new places of worship, the Georgian churches were largely concentrated in the centre of the city. The new suburbs spreading further from that centre, this resulted in a major building programme of places of worship. Princes Park & Sefton Park areas saw the construction of some of the finest places of worship in Liverpool. In Prince's Road at the north end: Greek Orthodox Church of St Nicholas built for the city's small but wealthy Greek community whose wealth largely derived from shipping; Welsh Presbyterian Church (1865–67), the Welsh born population of the city was 20,000 in 1870 rising to 80,000 in 1891, much of their wealth came from property speculation; the Princes Road Synagogue was built for Orthodox Jewish community; and the Church of St Margaret of Antioch has one of the most elaborate interiors of any of the city's churches. Near Sefton Park the Anglican church of Saint Agnes and Saint Pancras, Ullet Road; the Roman Catholic St Clare's Church, Arundel Avenue; Ullet Road Unitarian Church; the Anglican Christ Church, Linnet Lane.

Certain churches were built to cater for the poorest areas of the city, St Clement, Beaumont Street, Toxteth, that was Low church Anglican; and for Roman Catholic congregations St Alban's, Athol Street, Vauxhall (1849), now used as a climbing centre, Our Lady of Reconciliation (1859–60), Eldon Street, Vauxhall; St Sylvester's (1889), Silvester Street, Vauxhall; All Souls' (1870 demolished 1967), Collingwood Street, Kirkdale, St Briget's Bevington Hill, Vauxhall (1870 demolished 1967). These catered to a largely Irish Catholic working-class population, who had migrated to the city and congregated in the northern suburb of Vauxhall in the wake of the Great Famine.

By the late 19th century Liverpool was a cosmopolitan city, there were many immigrant communities, many seamen passing through the port including natives of West Africa and the Far East, Chinatown dates from the 1860s, not many have left traces of their often temporary places of worship. A notable exception is Gustav Adolf Church (1883), Park Lane, by the mid-1850s over 50,000 Swedish seamen were visiting the city annually, the church was built for them. This era saw the establishment in 1889 of what is believed to be Britain's first Mosque, the Liverpool Muslim Institute in No. 8 Brougham Terrace, West Derby Road.

==== Victorian non-conformists churches, chapels, synagogues and Greek Orthodox church ====
Victorian Liverpool's notable places of worship include the Greek Orthodox Church of St Nicholas built in the Neo-Byzantine architecture style 1864–1870 original design William Hardie Hay (1813–1901) & James Murdoch Hay (1823–1915), built by Henry Sumners of Culshaw and Sumners; Former Victoria Chapel (1878–80), for the Welsh Calvinists, Crosshall Street by W.H. Picton, now used as the Juvenile Court; W. D. Caröe's Gustav Adolf Church (the Swedish Seamen's Church, reminiscent of Nordic styles). Fine examples of nonconformist churches in a Gothic style are the Welsh Presbyterian Church by Liverpool-based architects W. & G. Audsley; Ullet Road Unitarian Church and library of (1896–99) and the cloister and Church Hall (c.1901), both by Thomas Worthington & Percy Worthington, the stained glass is mostly by William Morris and Edward Burne-Jones, the mural paintings in the vestry and adjacent library are by Gerald Moira, in the cloister, there are memorials from an older church including a bust of William Roscoe by John Gibson, many of Liverpool's richest families were members of the congregation and included the Holts, the Tates, the Roscoes, the Rathbones and the Brunners. Having a Jewish community since the mid-18th century, Liverpool has several synagogues. The grade I listed Princes Road Synagogue, by W. & G. Audsley in the Moorish Revival style is architecturally the most important. and cost nearly £15,000 Two further orthodox synagogues are in the Allerton and the Childwall district, where a significant Jewish community resides. There are several classical style chapels in Liverpool including the small Particular Baptist Chapel, Everton (1847) architect unknown, converted to flats 2005 and the Old Welsh Chapel, by Oliver and Lamb of Newcastle, now the Chatham Building University of Liverpool.

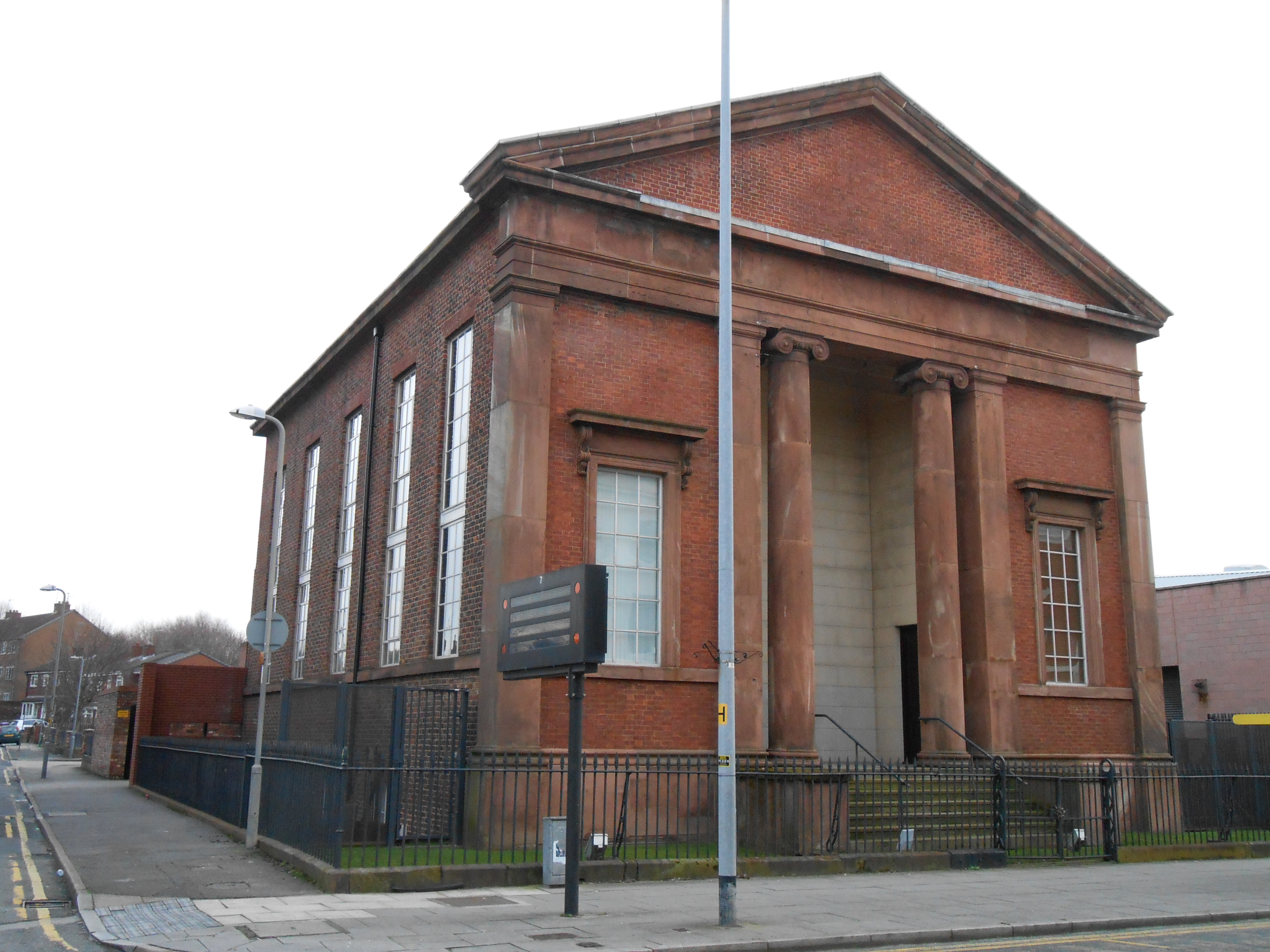
The former Particular Baptist Chapel, Shaw Street, Everton
(1847; Grade II)

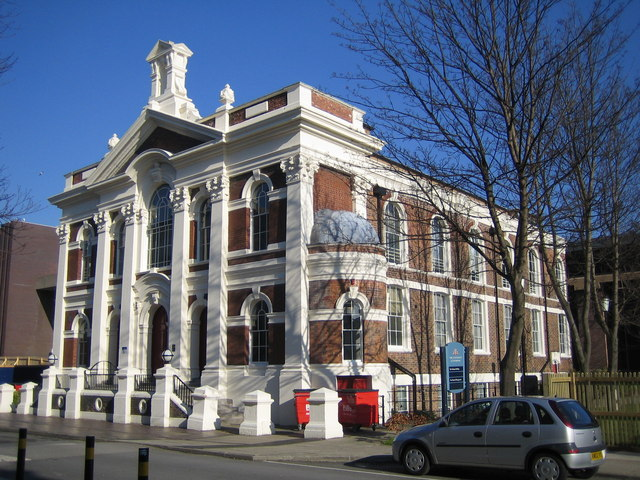
Former Old Welsh Chapel, now Chatham Building, Chatham Street
University of Liverpool
(1861; Grade II)

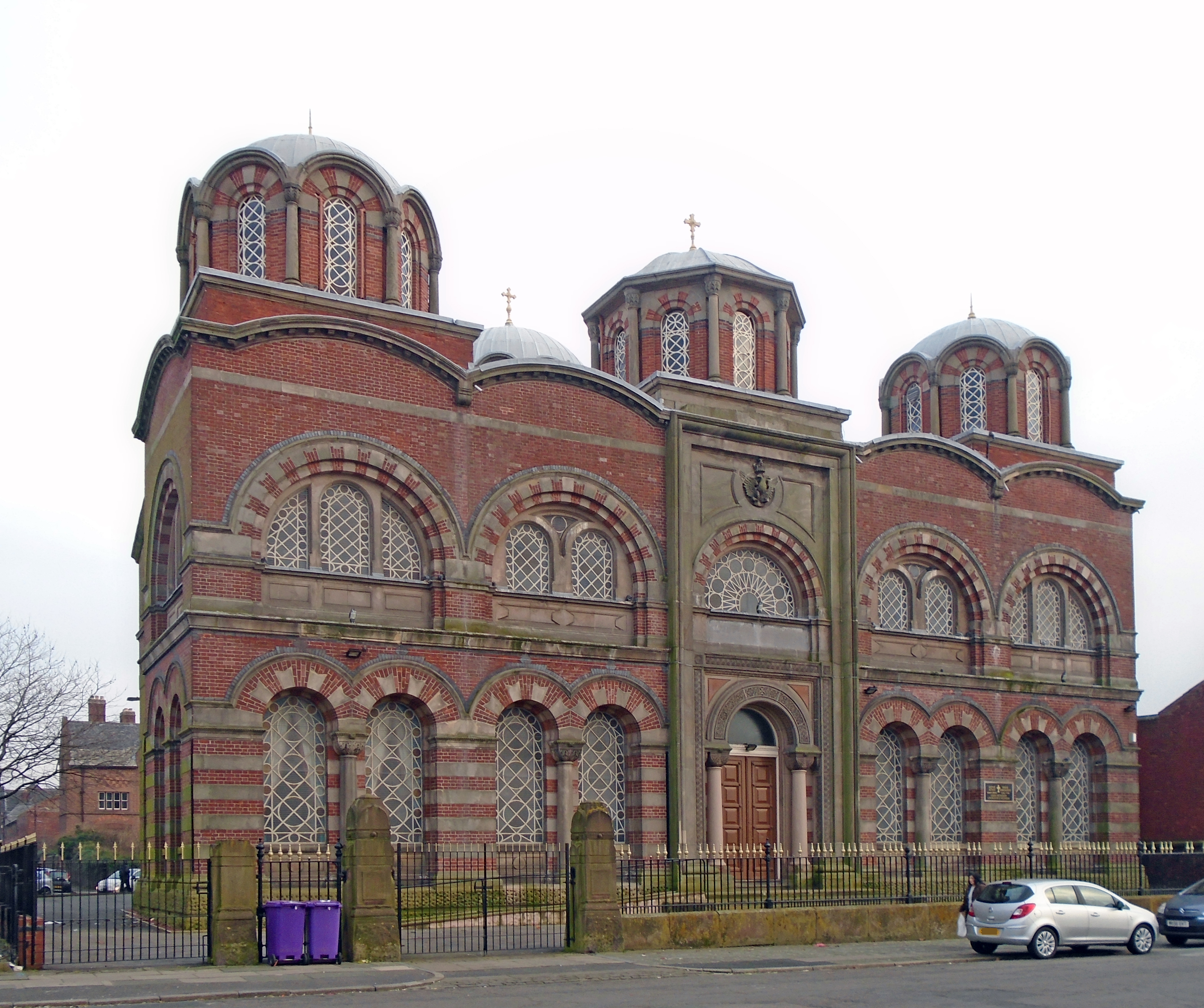
Greek Orthodox Church of St Nicholas, Princes Road
(1864–1870; Grade II)

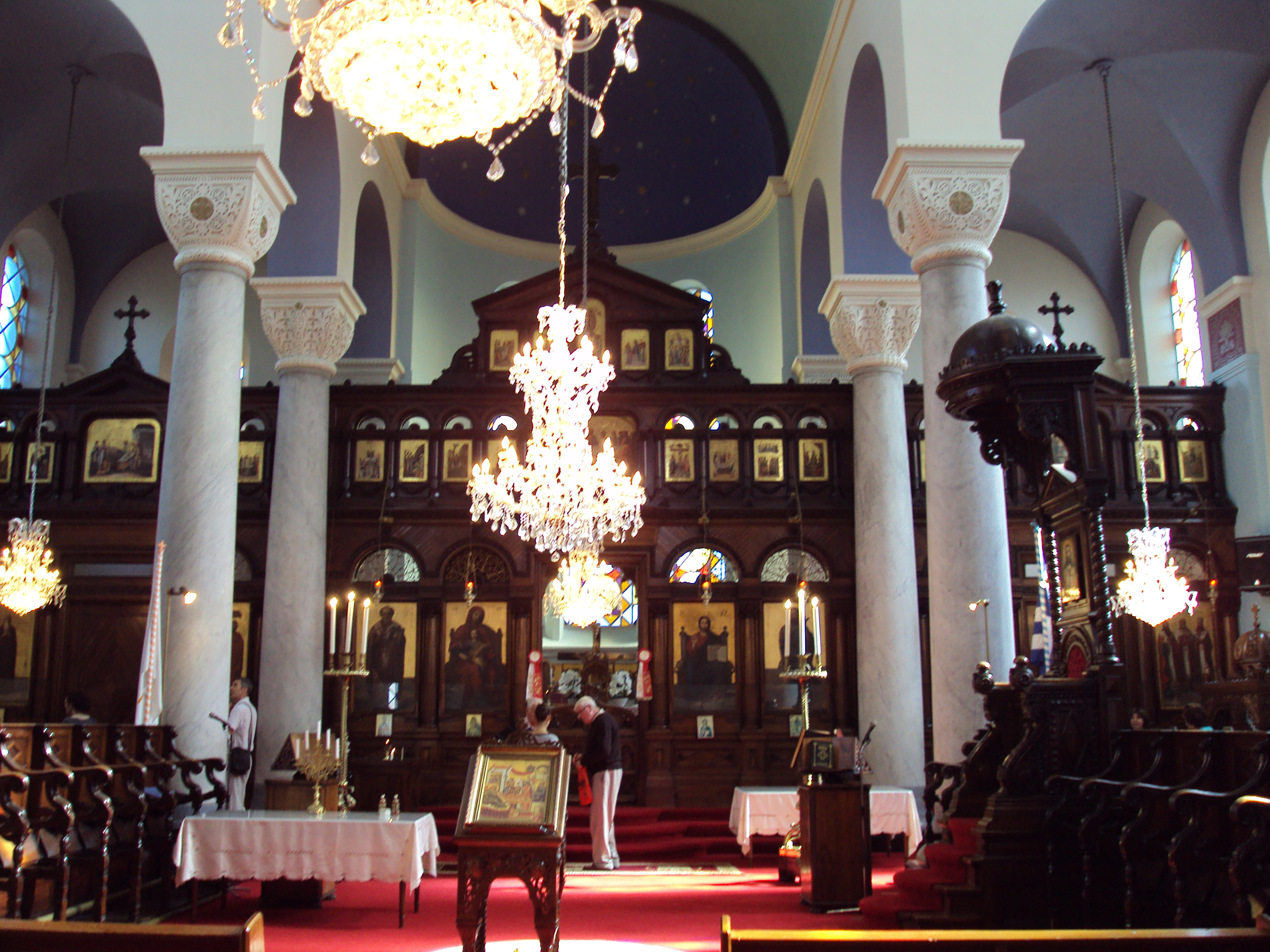
Interior, Greek Orthodox Church of St Nicholas
(1864–70; Grade II)

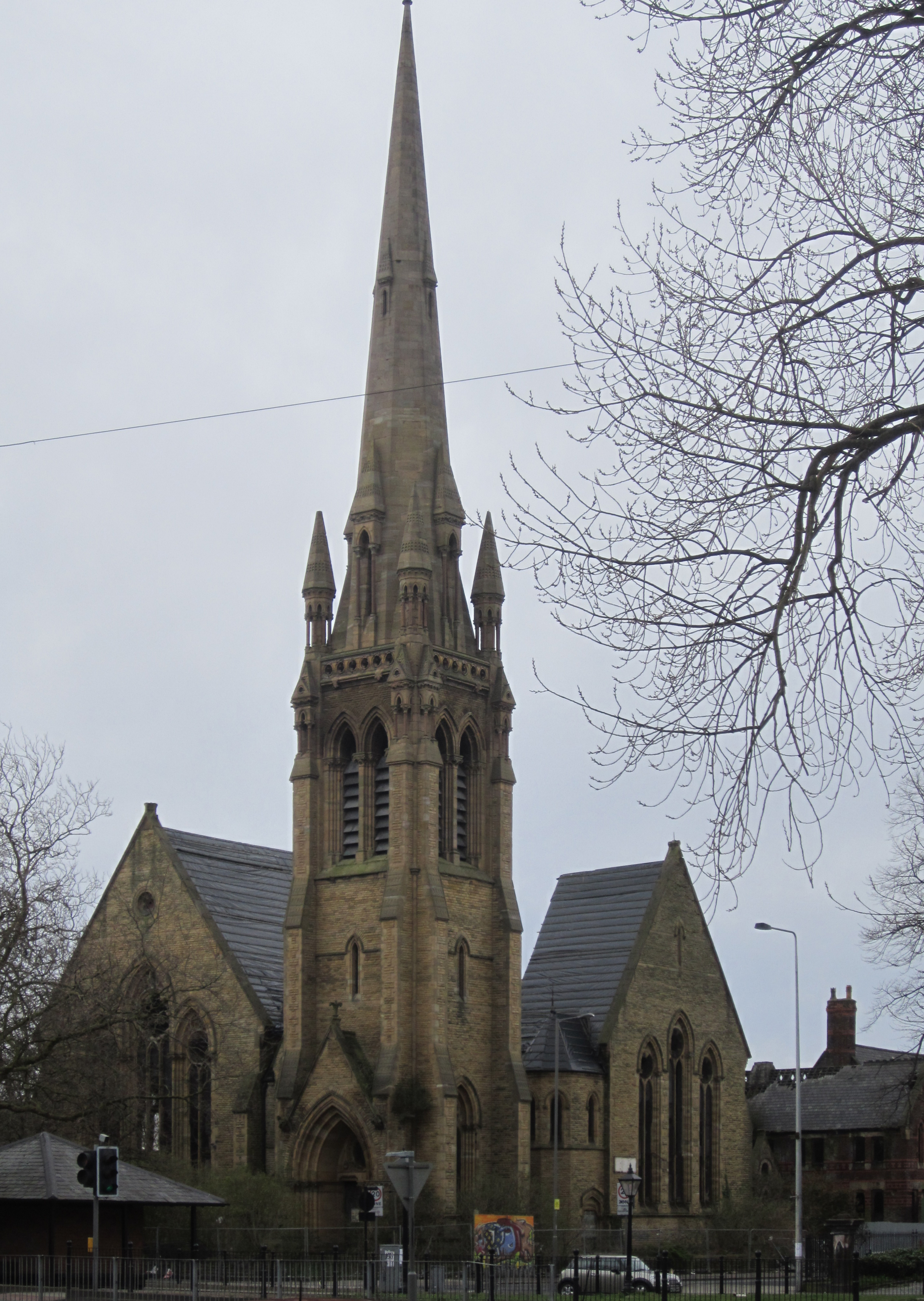
Welsh Presbyterian Church, Princes Road
(1865–67; Grade II)

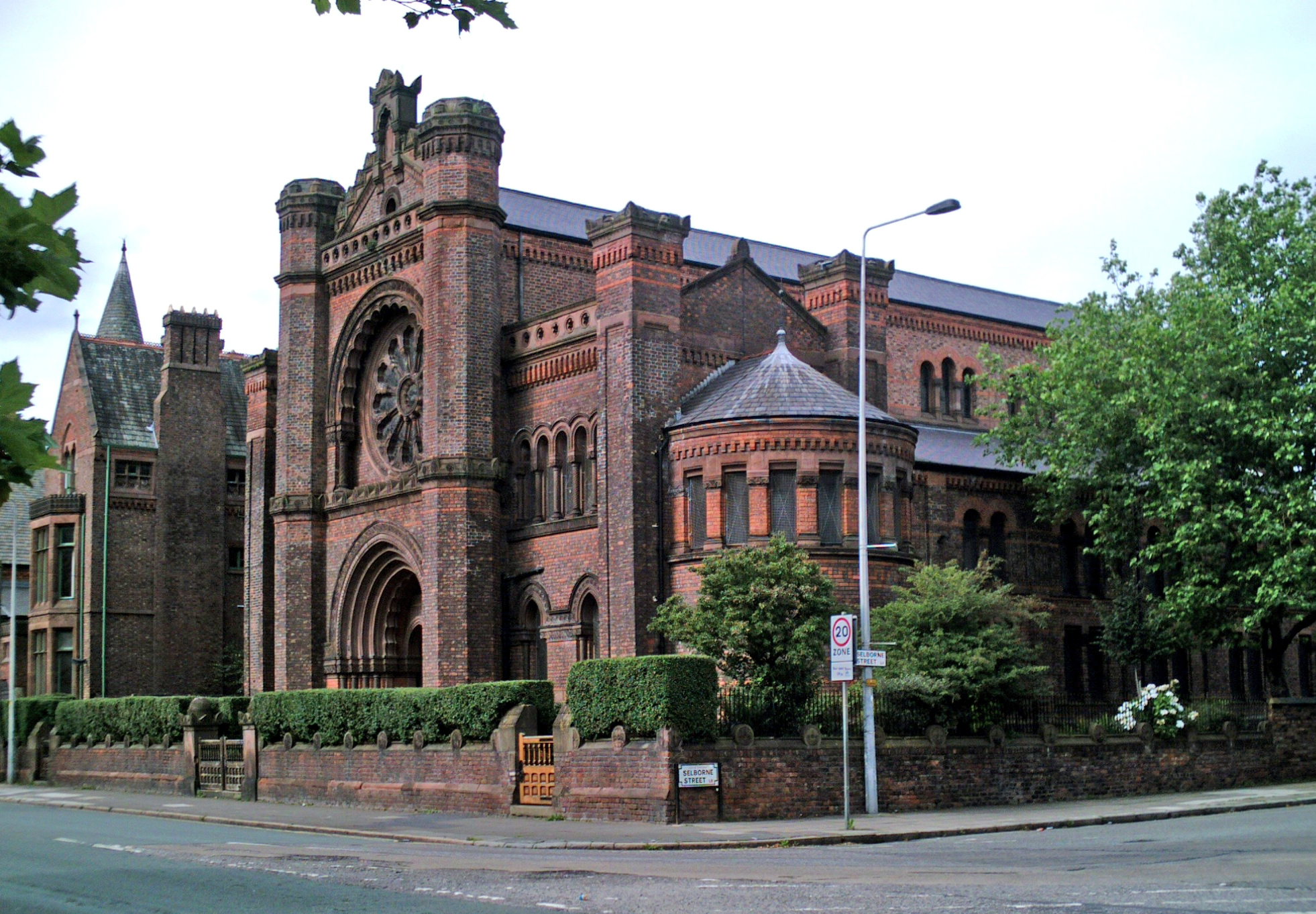
Princes Road synagogue
(1872–74; Grade I)

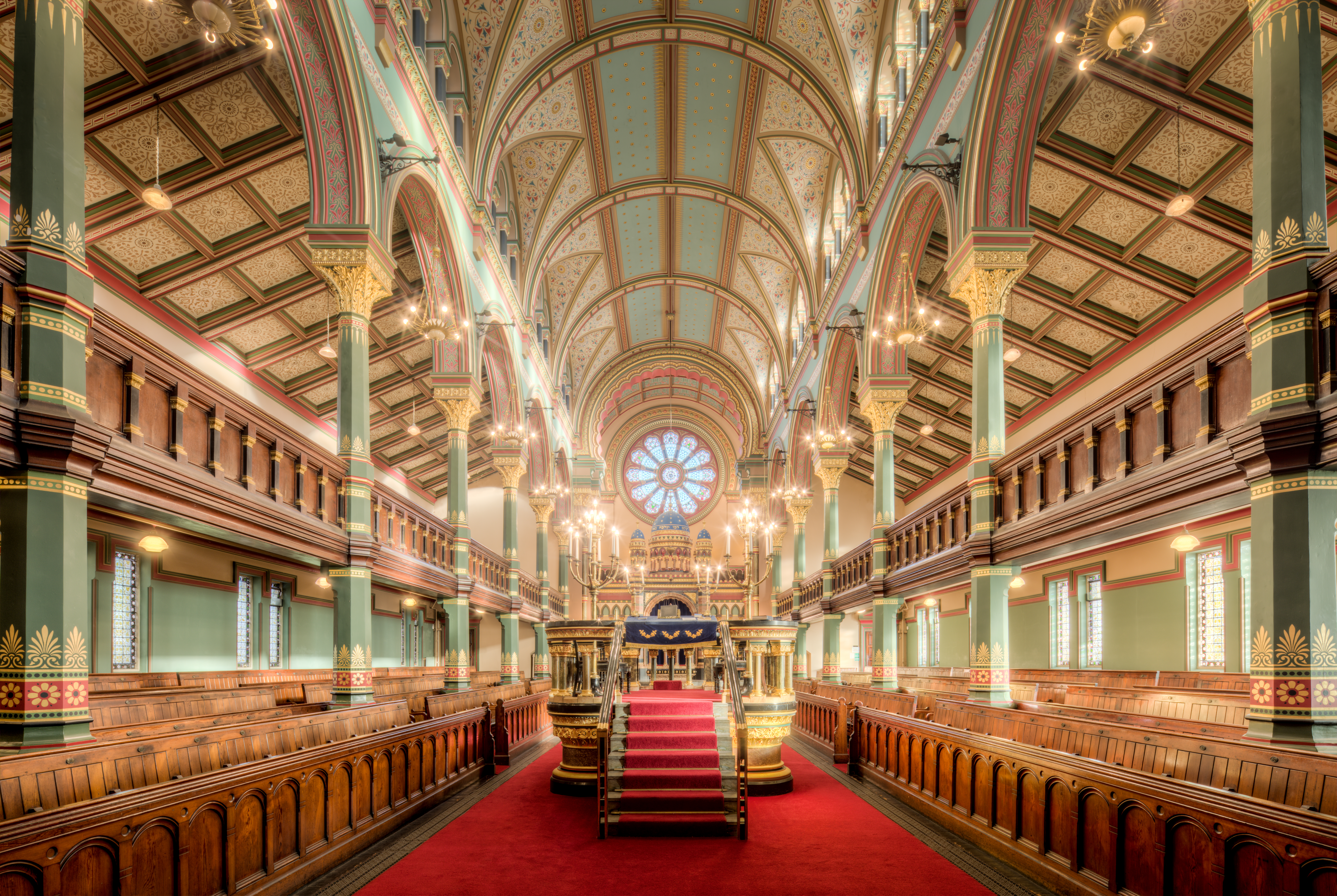
Princes Road synagogue interior
(1872–74; Grade I)

==== Anglican parish churches ====
During the 19th century, three generations of the Horsfall family had a major influence on Anglican church building in Liverpool. Charles Horsfall a merchant and stockbroker was a founder of St George's Everton, his sons built Christ Church (1848) (destroyed by bombing 1941), Great Homer Street, Everton, in his memory. His son Robert and grandson Douglas became strong advocates of the Oxford Movement. Robert Horsfall paid for St Margaret's of Antioch, Douglas Horsfall paid for Church of St Agnes and St Pancras, cost £28,000.

Many Liverpool suburbs have Gothic Revival churches, those belonging to the Church of England include: Church of St Clement, Liverpool by Arthur and George Yates Williams; Holy Trinity, Walton Breck, Anfiled by John Hay; St Mary's Church, West Derby by George Gilbert Scott; Church of Saint John the Baptist by George Frederick Bodley; Christ Church, Toxteth Park by Culshaw and Sumners; Church of St Margaret of Antioch by George Edmund Street; Church of St Matthew and St James, Mossley Hill by Paley and Austin; All Saints Church, Speke by John Loughborough Pearson; Church of All Hallows, Allerton by George Enoch Grayson, most of the stained glass is by William Morris's firm some to the designs of Edward Burne-Jones; St Michael's Church, Garston by Thomas D. Barry & Son; Church of St Agnes and St Pancras, Toxteth Park by John Loughborough Pearson; St Cyprian's Durning Road, Edge Hill is by Henry Sumners; St Peter's Church, Woolton, Liverpool by Grayson and Ould; Church of St. Dunstan's by Charles Aldridge and Charles Deacon.

An example of Romanesque Revival architecture is the parish church of St Anne, Aigburth architects Cunningham and Holme. The now redundant Christ Church (1870), Kensington, Edge Hill by W & G Audsley is red brick in an Italian Romanesque style.

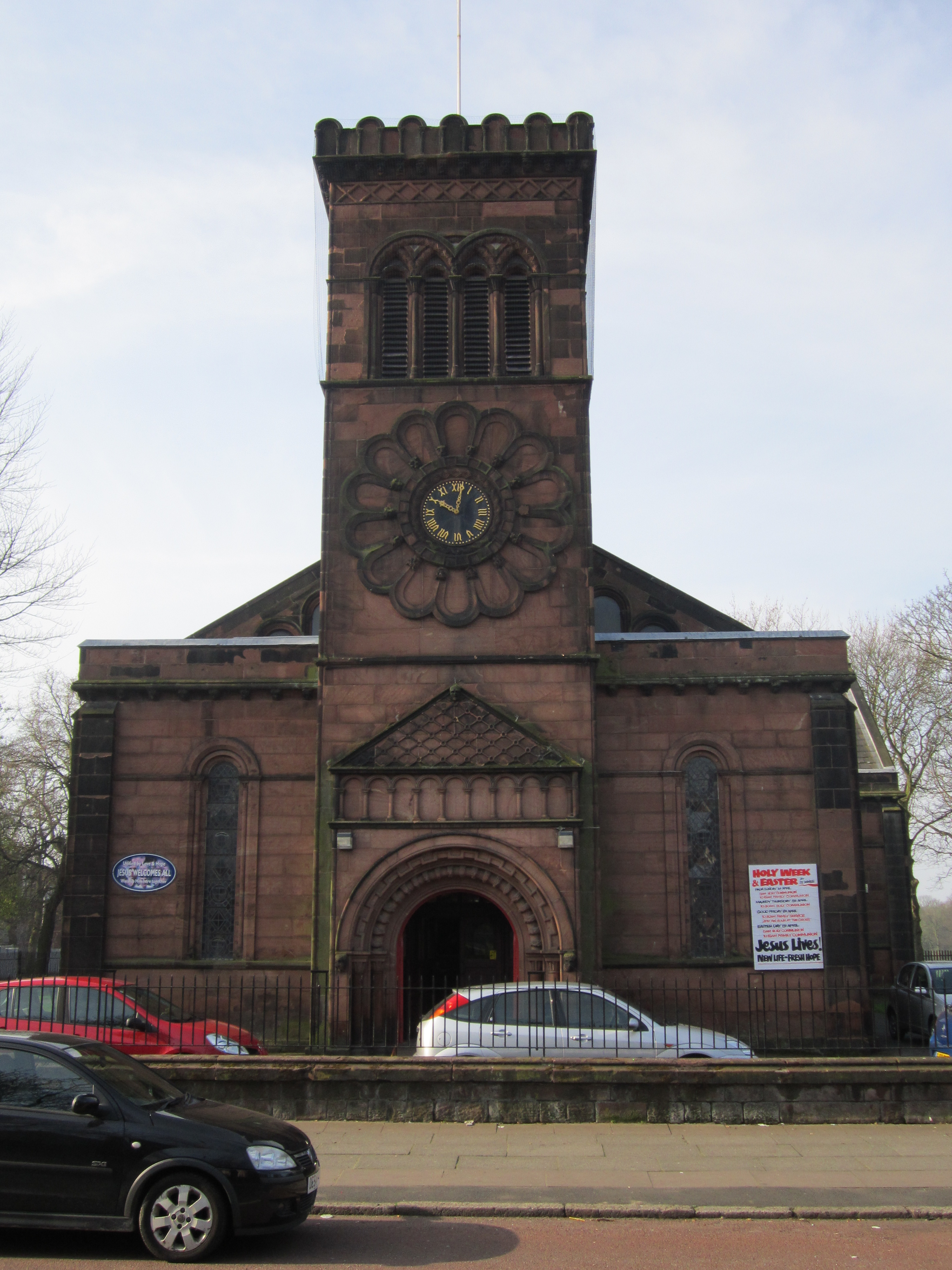
St Anne's Church, Aigburth Road, Aigburth
(1836–37; Grade II*)

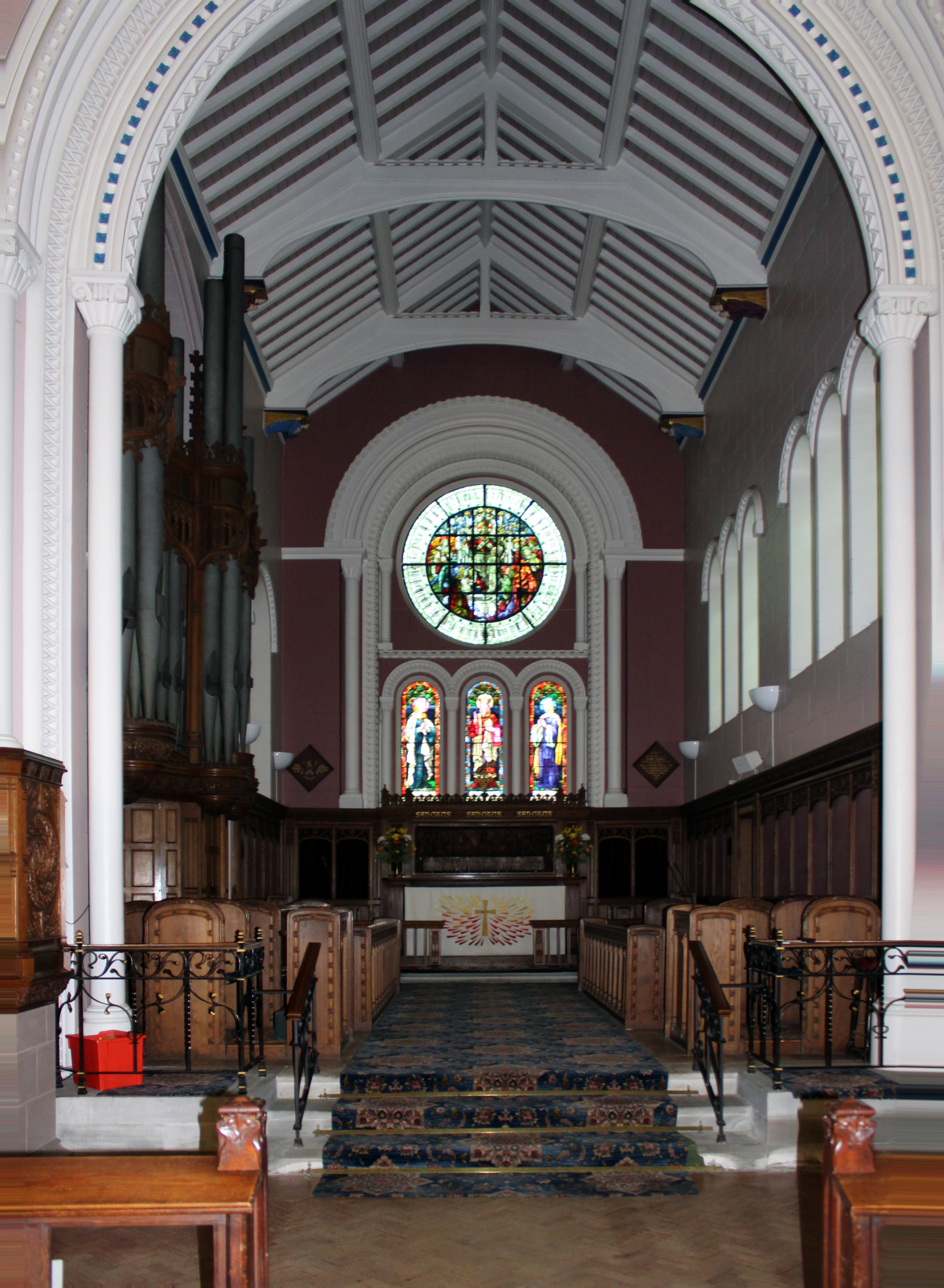
The chancel interior, St Anne's Church, Aigburth
(1834–37; Grade II*)

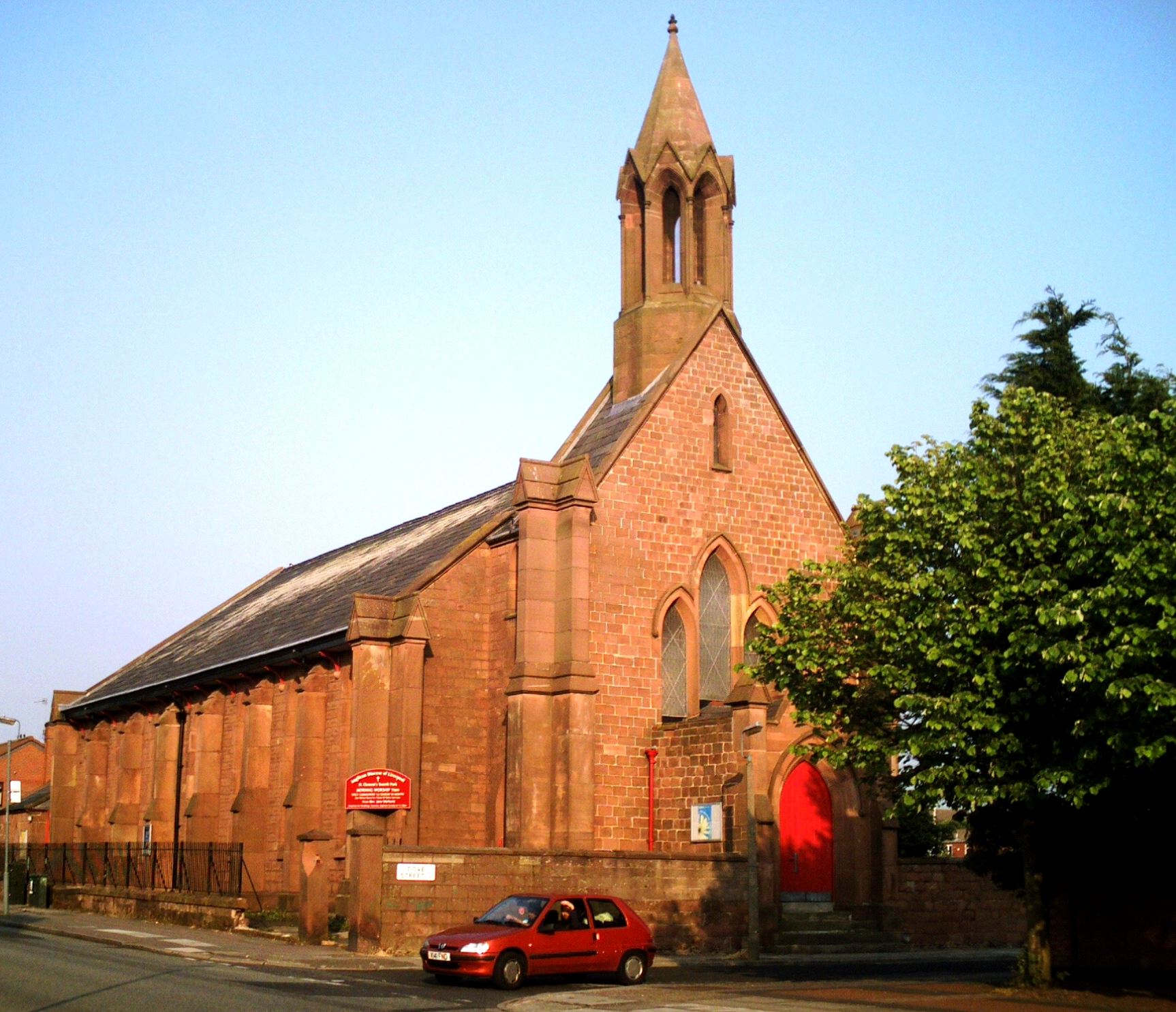
St Clement, Beaumont Street, Toxteth
(1840–41; Grade II*)

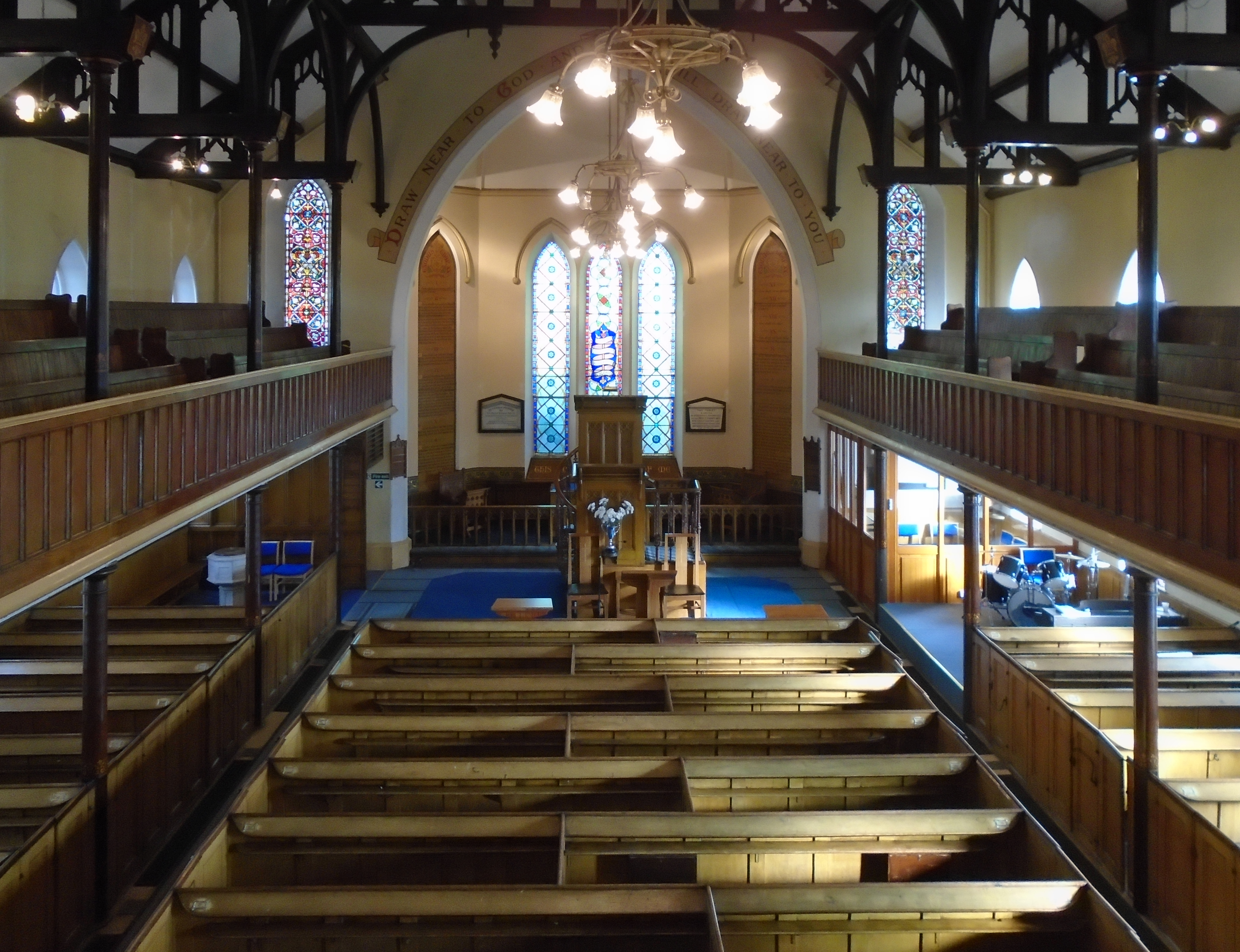
Interior, St Clement, Beaumont Street, Toxteth
(1840–41; Grade II*)

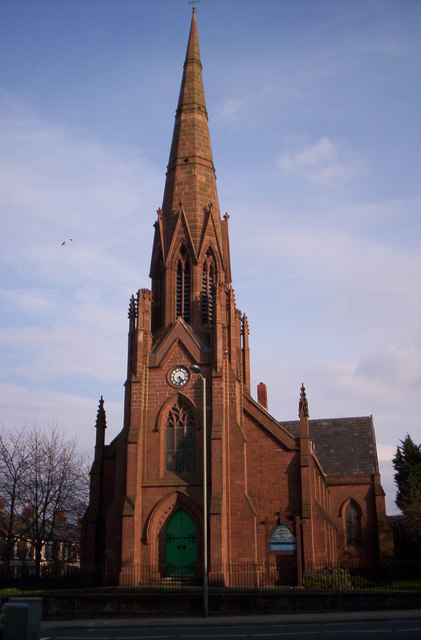
Holy Trinity Church, Walton Breck, Anfield
(1845–47; Grade II)

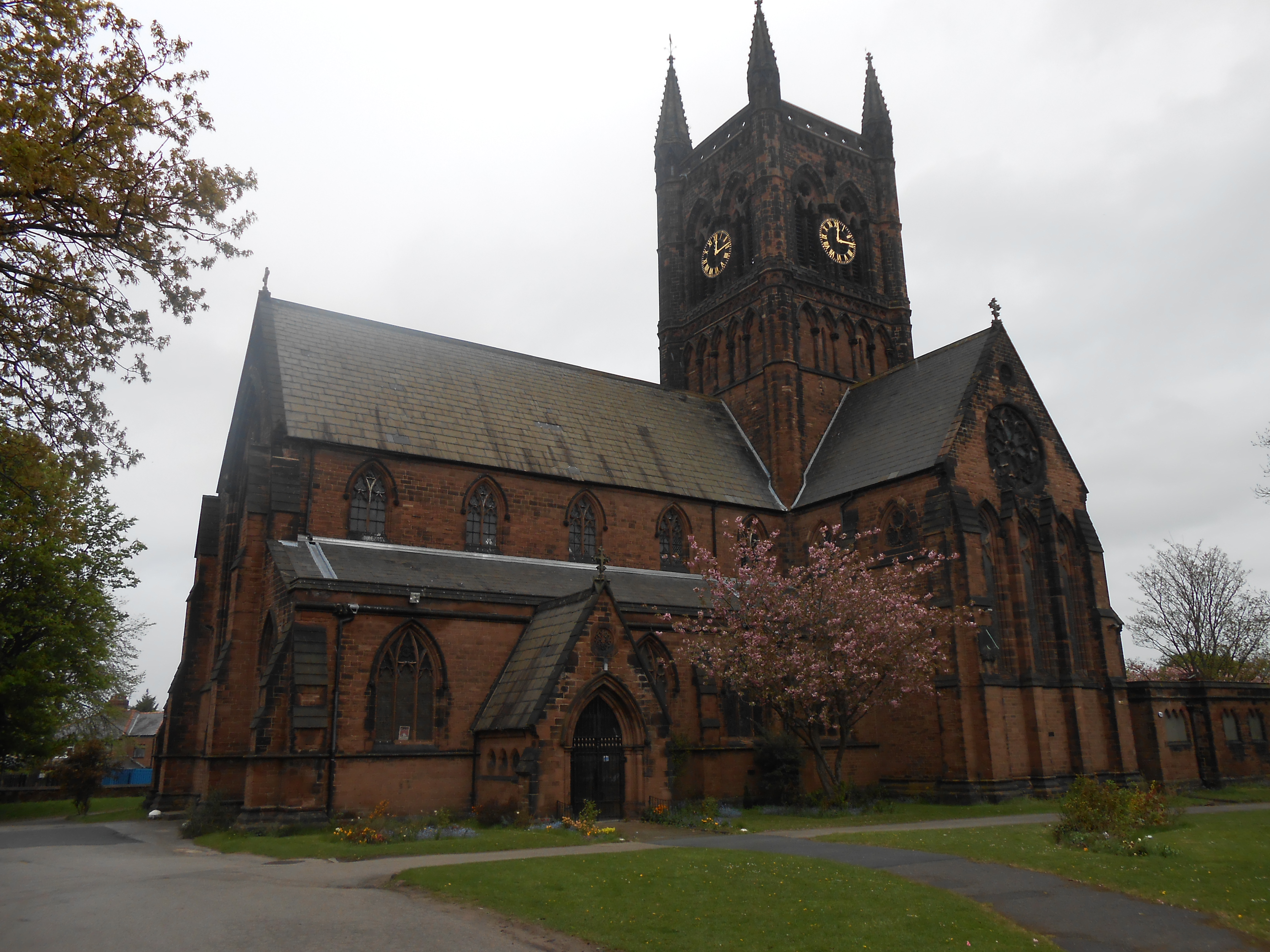
St Mary's Church, West Derby
(1853–56; Grade II*)

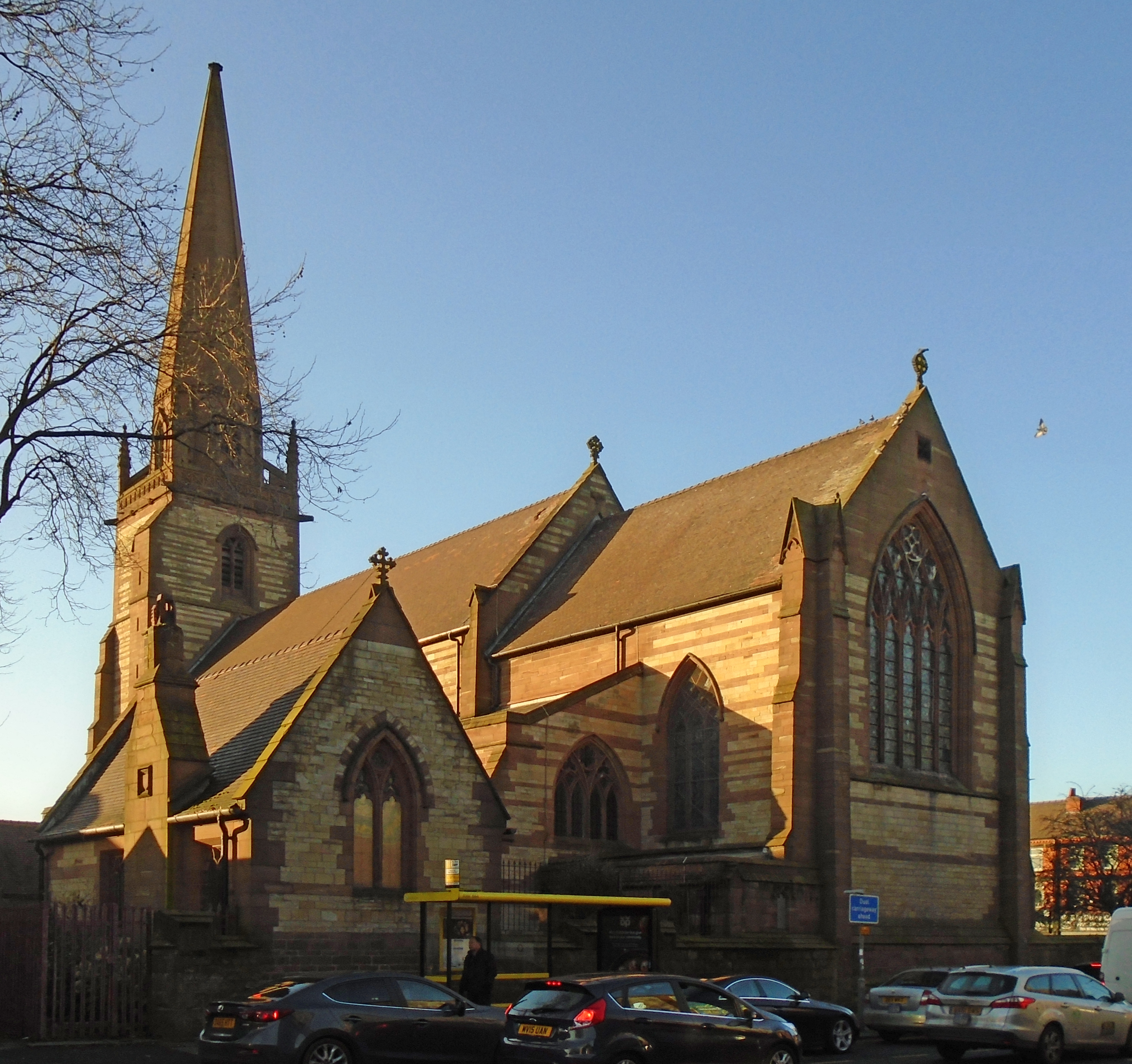
Church of Saint John the Baptist, Tuebrook
(1867–70; Grade I)

==== Roman Catholic churches ====
Gothic style parish churches that are Roman Catholic include: St Oswald's Church, Old Swan (1840–42) by Augustus Pugin, the interior rebuilt (1951–57) by Adrian Gilbert Scott in a modern idiom, the tower and spire by Pugin survive, the associated Convent of Mercy is almost certainly also by Pugin; St Francis Xavier Church, Everton, by Joseph John Scoles is one of the grandest Catholic churches in the city; St Anne's Church, Edge Hill by Charles Francis Hansom later altered by Pugin & Pugin; Church of St Vincent de Paul, Liverpool, by E. W. Pugin; Our Lady of Reconciliation by E. W. Pugin; St Sylvester's Church, Vauxhall by Pugin & Pugin; Our Lady of Mount Carmel RC Church (1876–78), Toxteth was designed by Liverpool architect James O'Byrne; Sacred Heart Church (1885–86), Hall Lane, Everton, by George Goldie, Charles Edwin Child & Edward Goldie, with a high altar by Pugin & Pugin; Church of St Clare, Liverpool (1888–90) by Leonard Stokes, cost £7,834 paid for by brothers and cotton brokers Francis & James Reynolds, the high altar Triptych was painted by Robert Anning Bell and relief sculpture by George Frampton. An example of a church in Italianate style is the Church of Saint Bridget, Wavertree by E.A. Heffer. Bishop Eton Monastery, Chapel begun 1851, Augustus Welby Northmore Pugin, and Edward Welby Pugin completed 1858, the high altar of 1866 was designed by John Francis Bentley.

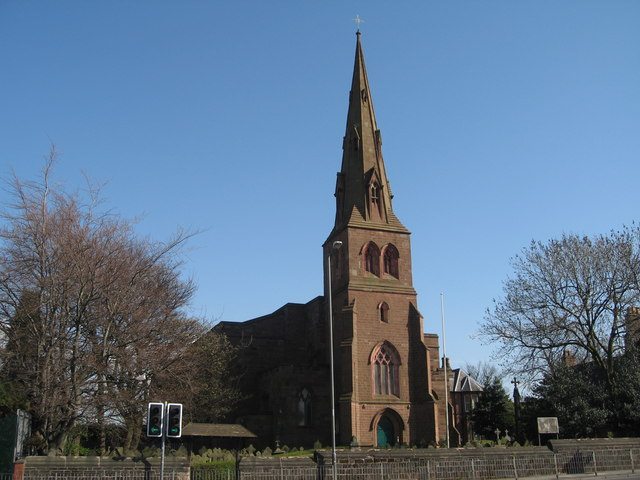
St Oswald's Church, St Oswald's Street, Old Swan, Tue Brook
(1840–42; Grade II)

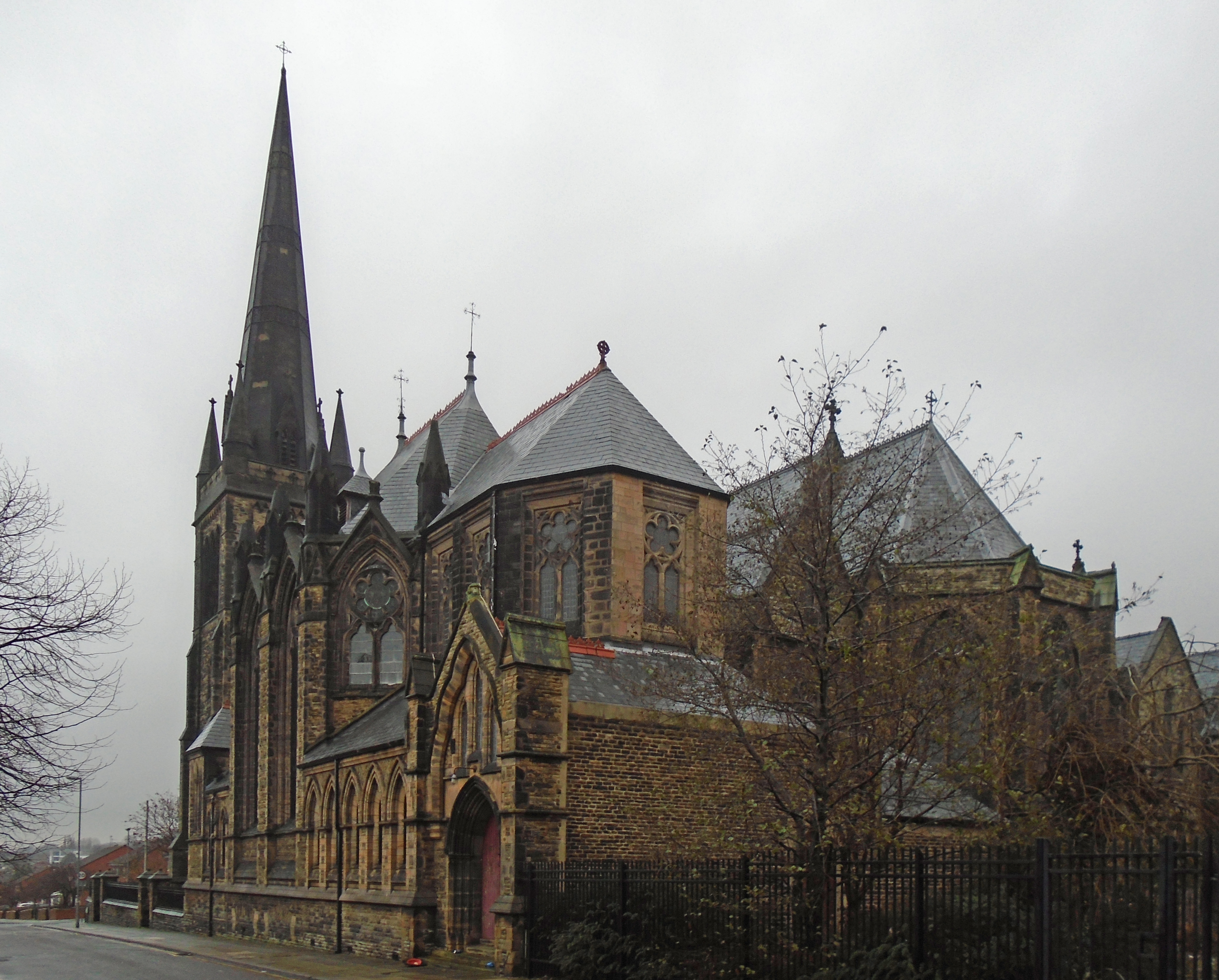
St Francis Xavier, Salisbury Street, Everton
(1842–87; Grade II*)

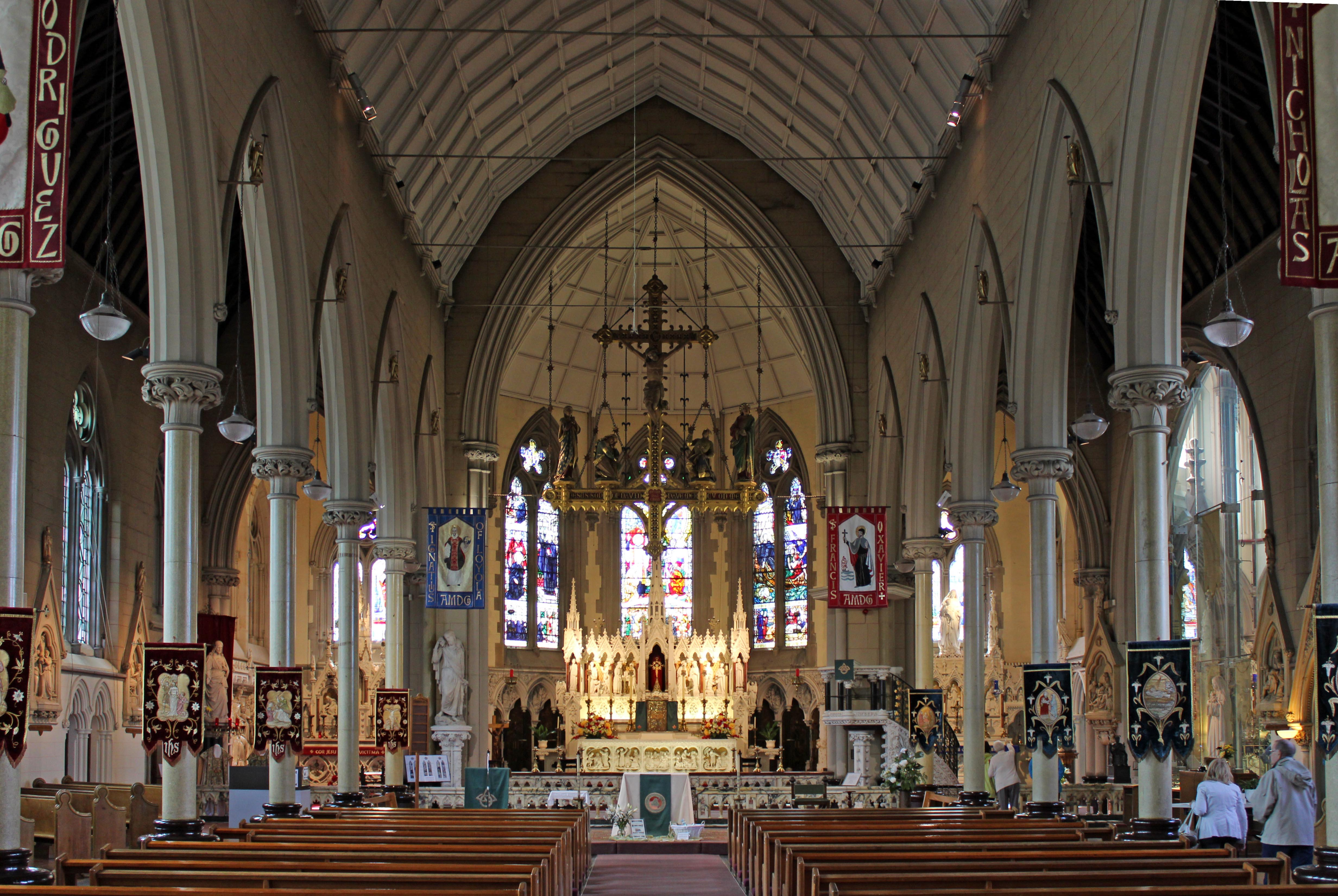
Interior, St Francis Xavier, Salisbury Street, Everton
(1842–87; Grade II*)

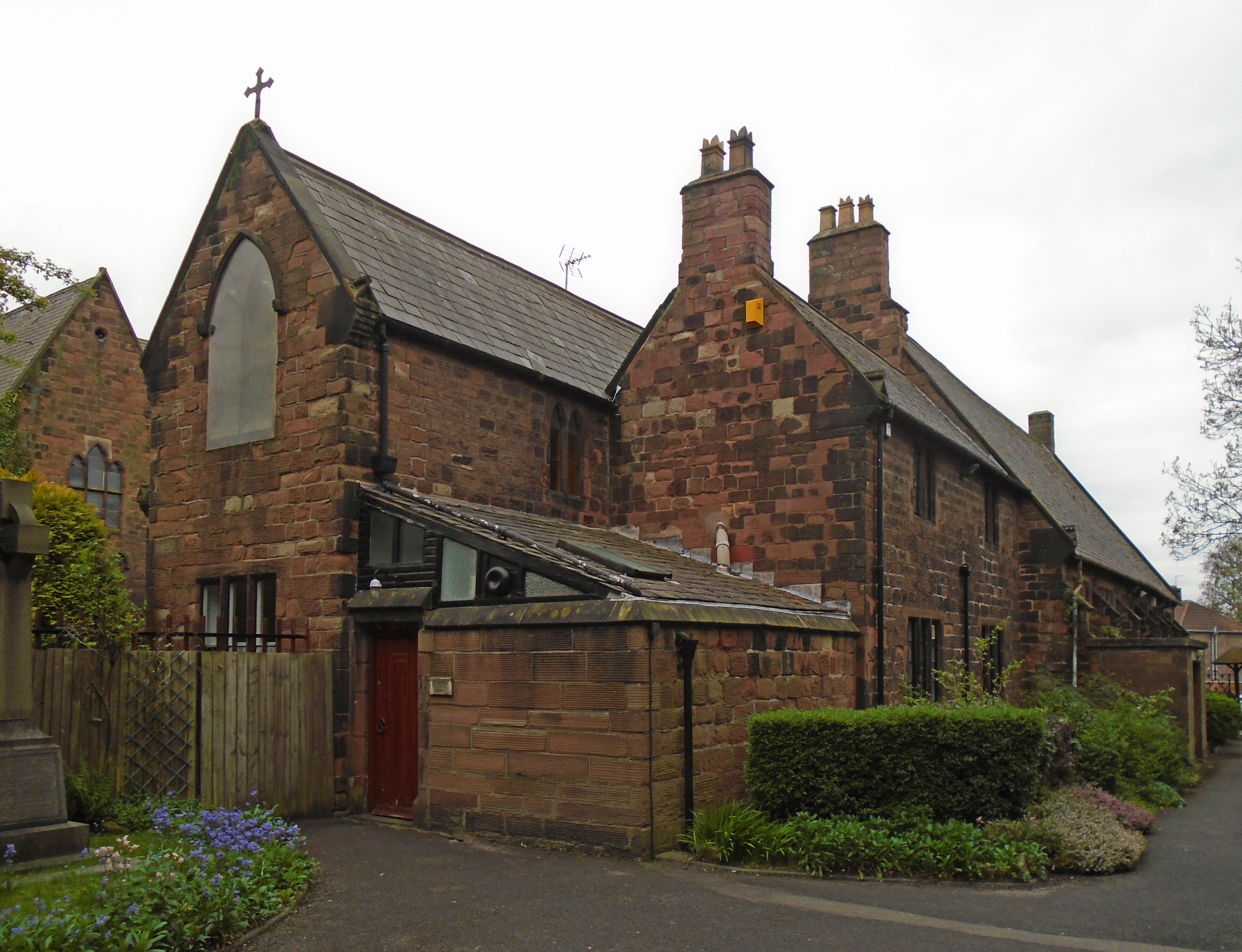
Convent of Mercy, St Oswald's Street, Old Swan, Tue Brook
(c.1845; Grade II)

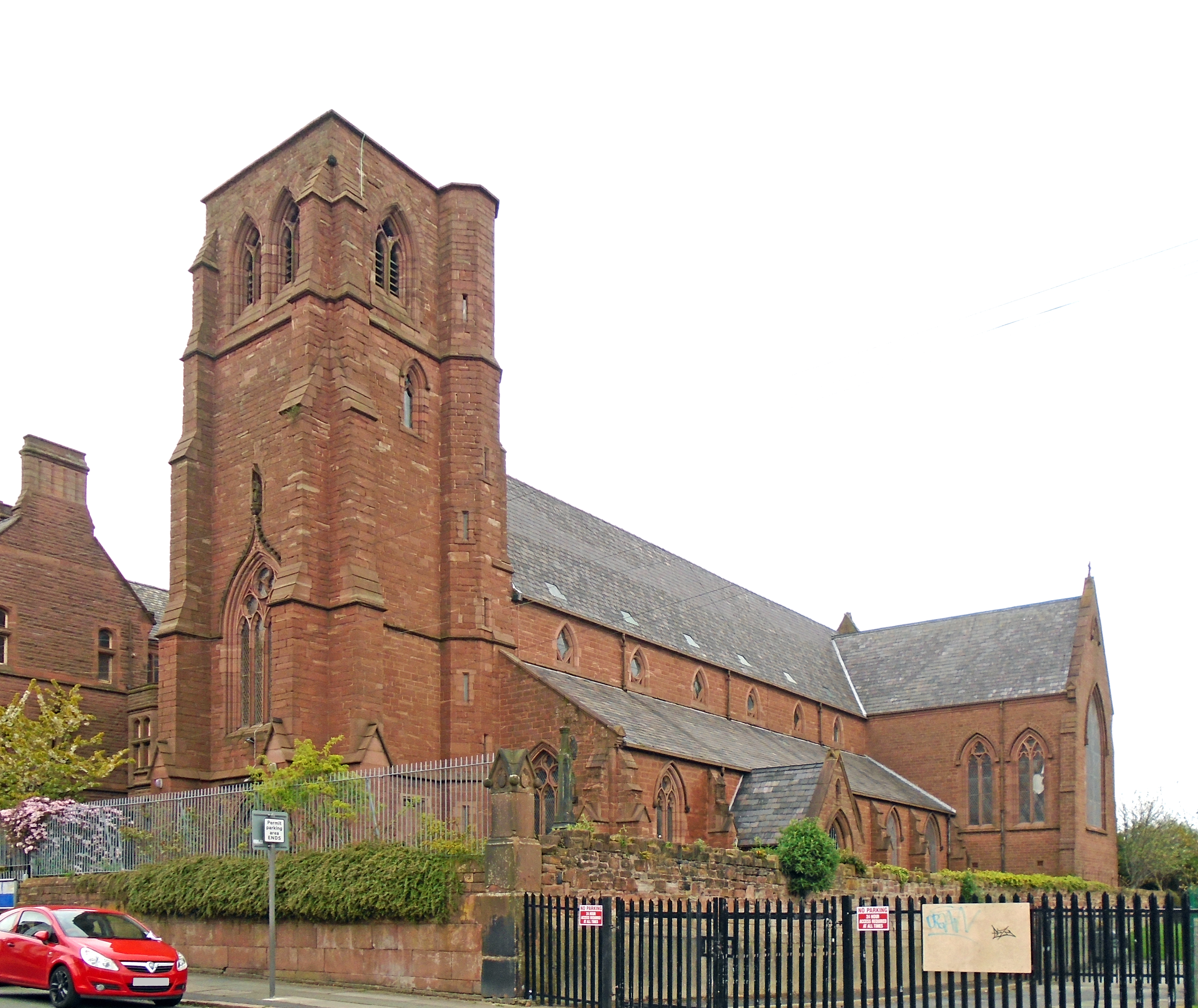
St Anne's, Overbury Street, Edge Hill
(1843-6 extended 1888–89; Grade II)

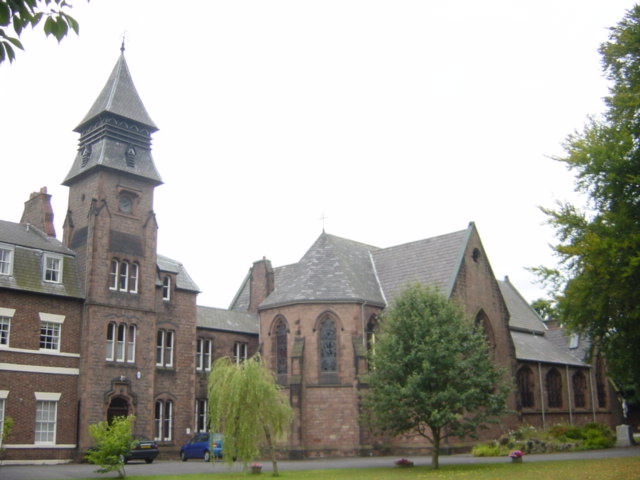
Bishop Eton Monastery, Woolton Road, Childwall
(1851–58; Grade II*)

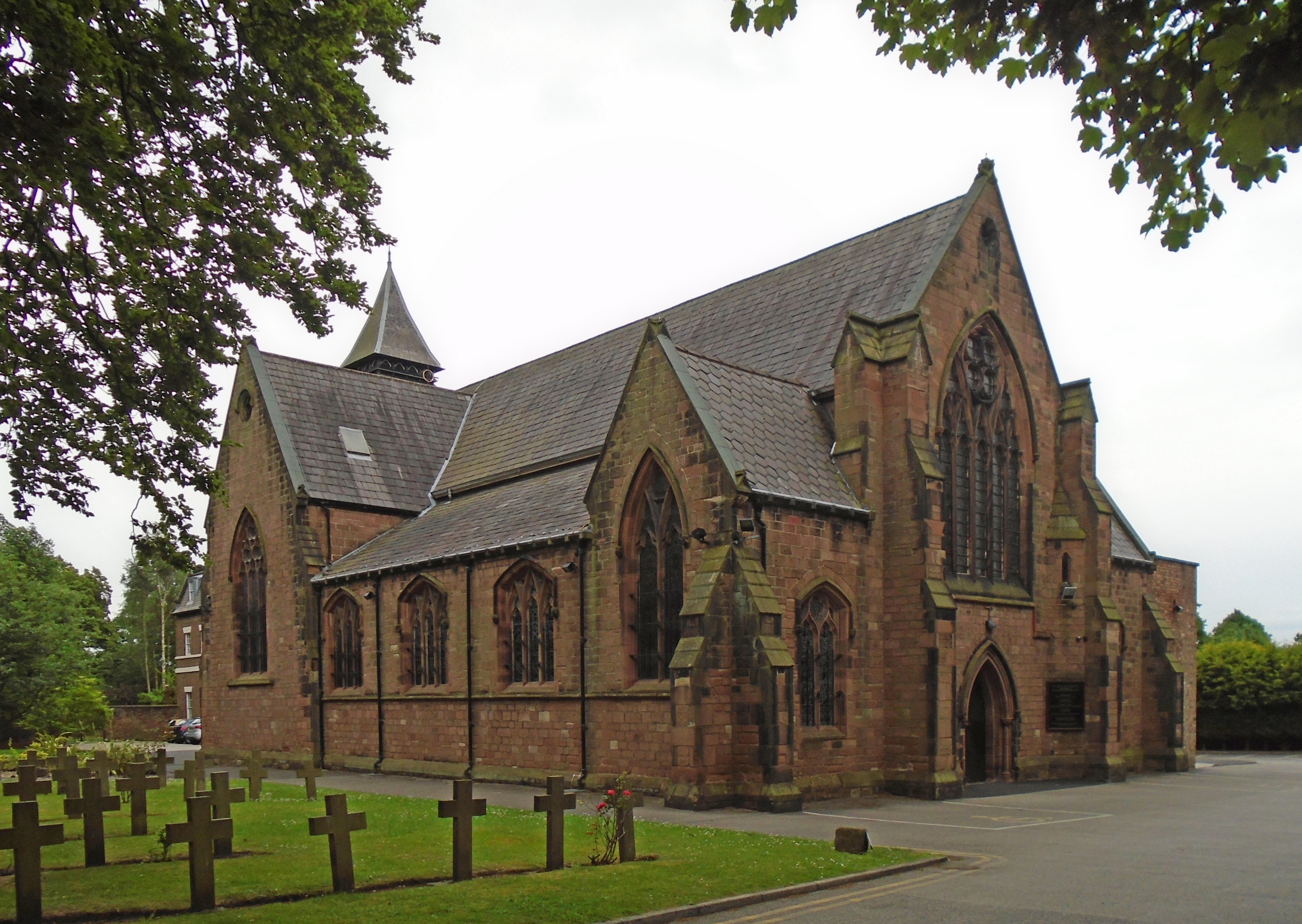
Church of Our Lady of the Annunciation, Bishop Eton, Woolton Road, Childwall
(1851–58; Grade II*)

=== Victorian infrastructure and transport ===
Liverpool Corporation Waterworks founded in (1847), oversaw the supply of drinking water and disposal of sewerage for the city. James Newlands was appointed in 1847 as borough engineer and designed the city's integrated sewer network, believed to be the first in the world. The Everton water tower and works completed 1857 to a design by Thomas Duncan, appointed in 1846 as the city's water engineer working for Newlands, is a notable example of Victorian infrastructure, and was connected to the then-new Rivington Reservoirs. The ever-growing city resulted in a greater demand for water and between 1881 and 1888 the Corporation went on to created Lake Vyrnwy in Wales, the cost was over £2 million, (nearly a £ quarter of a billion in 2019), the engineers responsible for the project were George Deacon borough engineer and Thomas Hawksley. In an era when gas lighting was used both for street lighting and increasingly throughout the period to light homes and from the 1880s gas stoves started to become common. Gasworks became essential to everyday life, Liverpool Gas Company 1845–1956 operated the now-demolished gasworks at Garston.

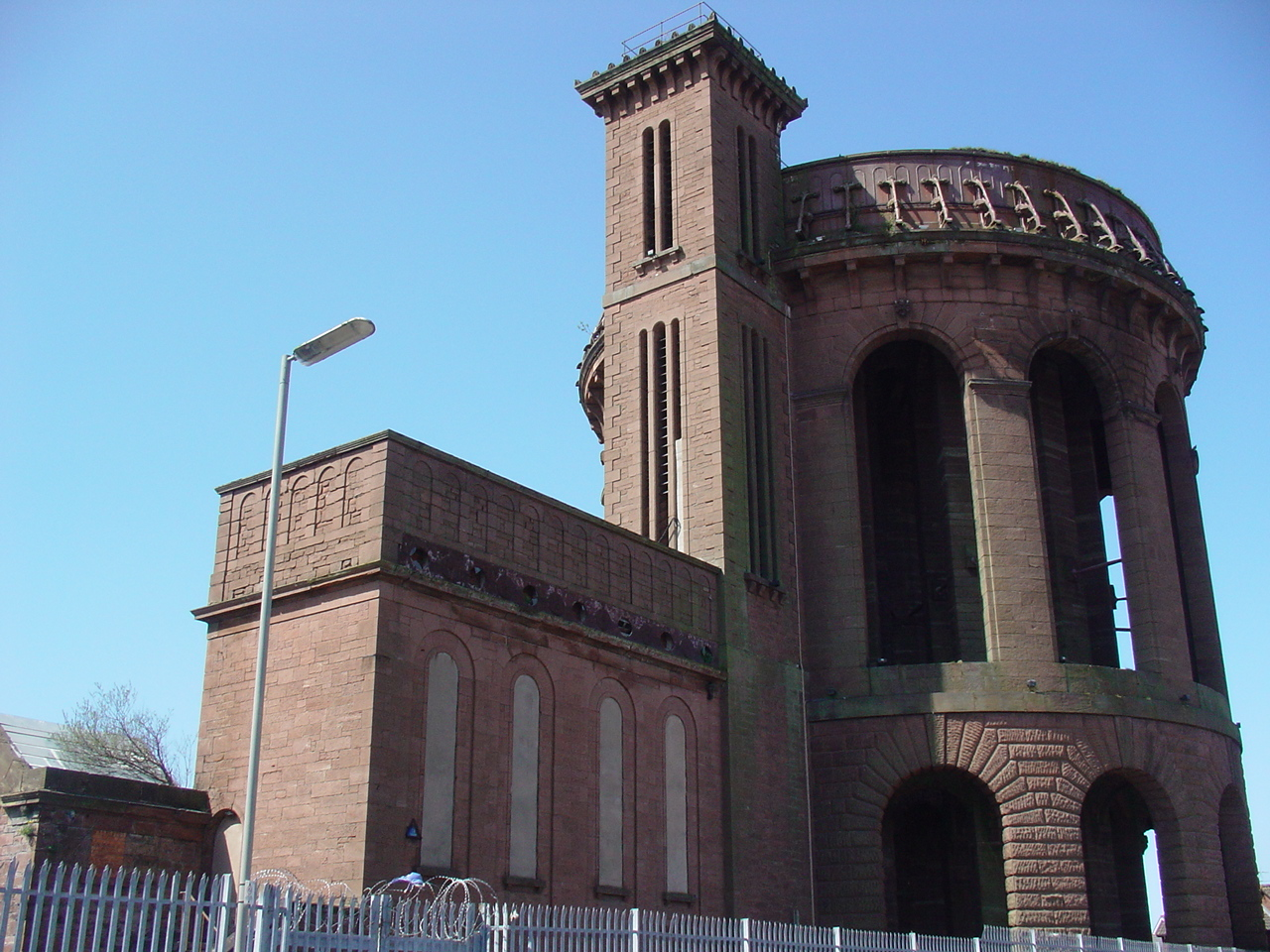
Everton Water Tower, Everton Waterworks, Margaret Street
(1857; Grade II)

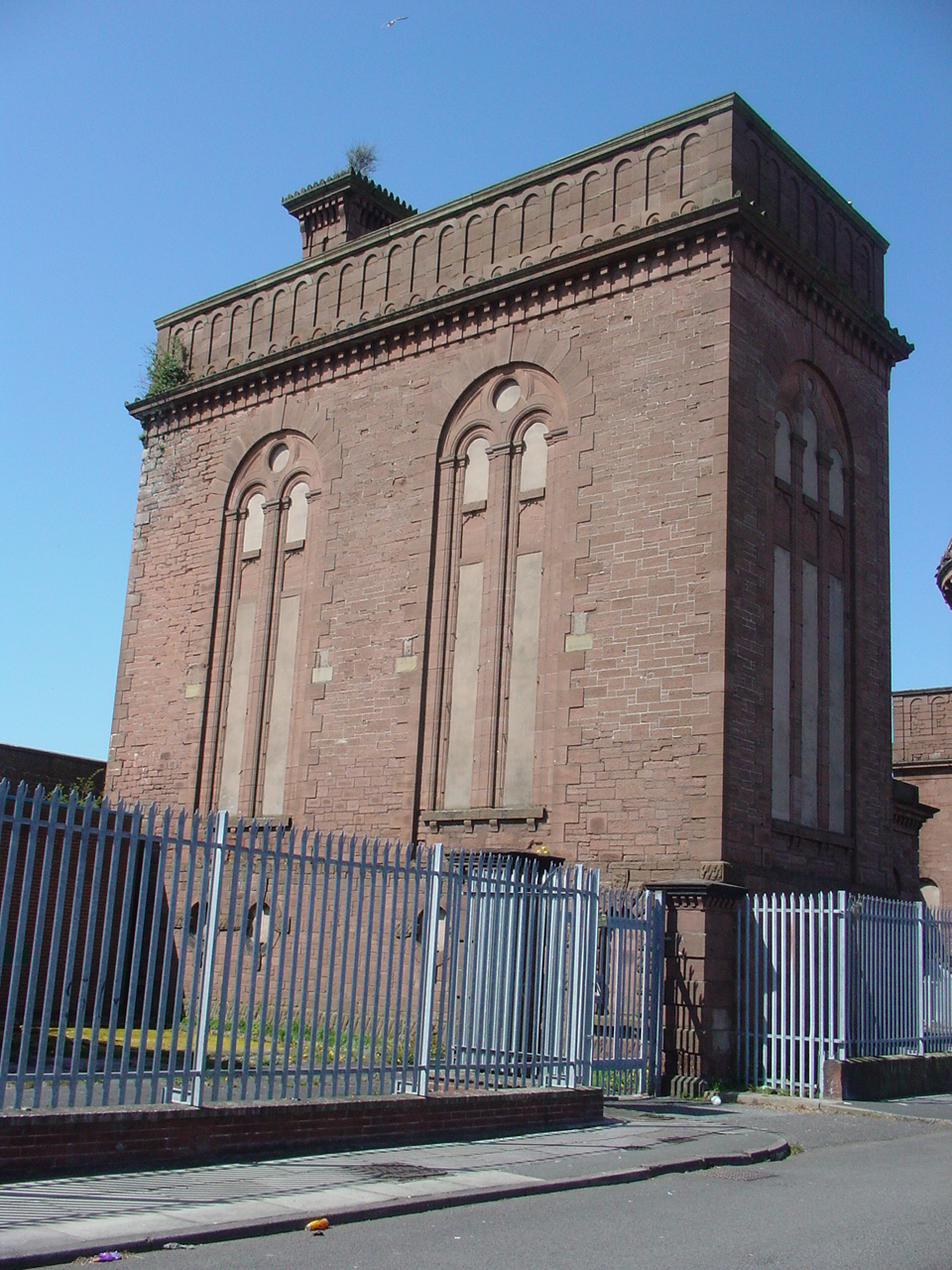
South Building, Everton Waterworks, Margaret Street
(1857; Grade II)

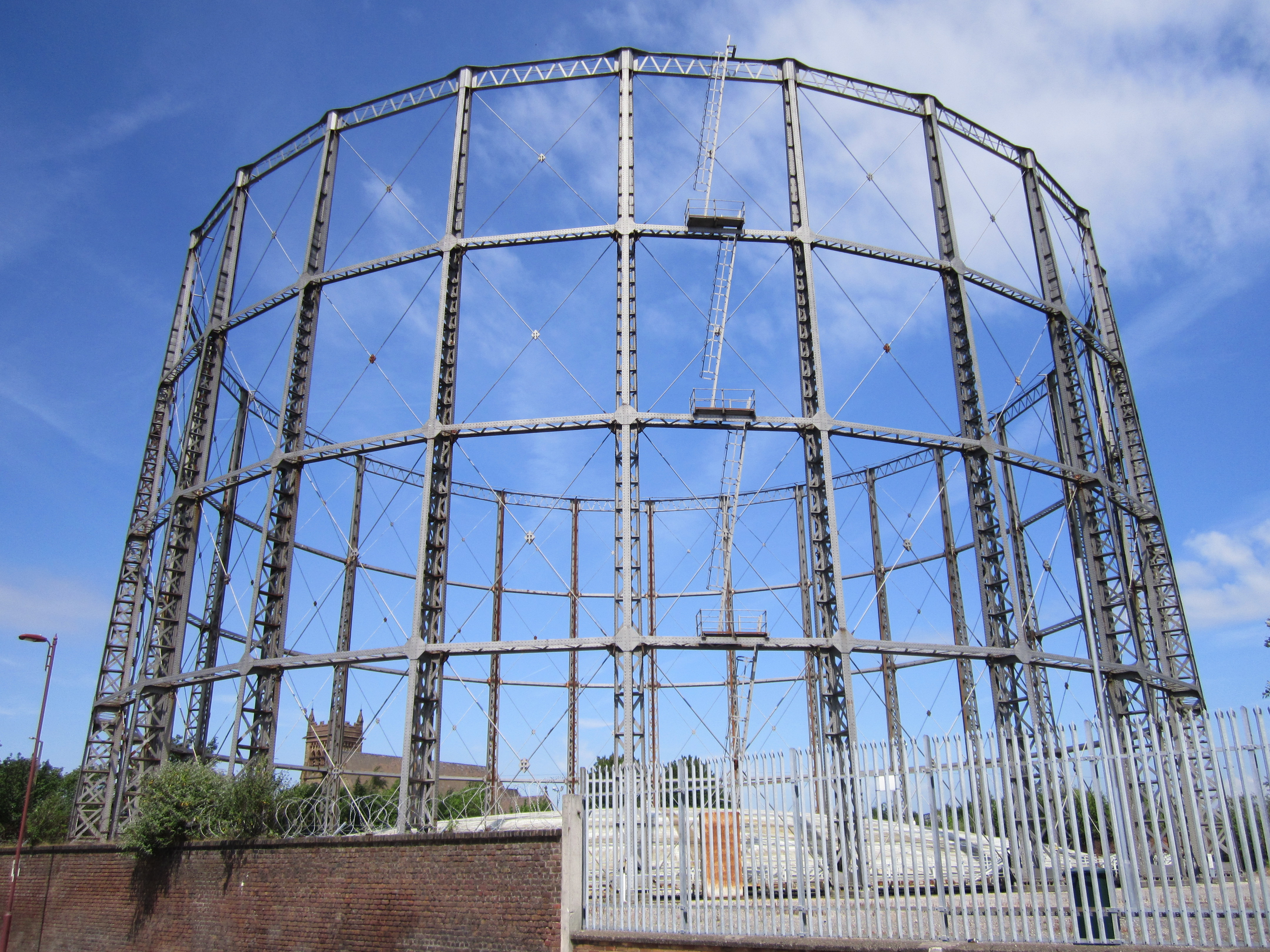
Gas holder, Garston Gasworks
(1891; demolished 2015)

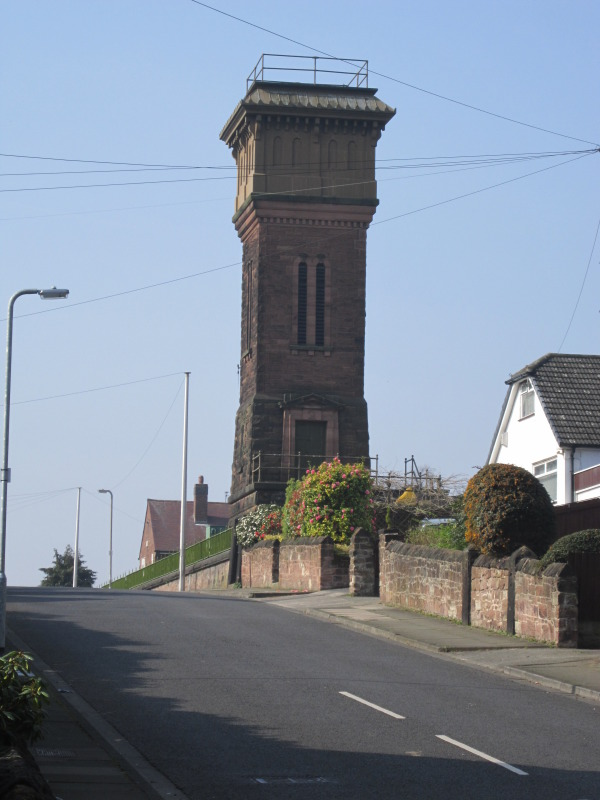
Water Tower, Reservoir Road, Woolton
(c.1900; Grade II)

Liverpool Lime Street railway station opened in 1836 as the terminus of the Liverpool and Manchester Railway, initially with a wooden roof by John Cunningham and Arthur Hill Holme the classical facade was by John Foster Jr.; in 1846–50 it was rebuilt by William Tite with an iron roofed train shed of 153 feet span by Richard Turner. This in turn was replaced by the current roof (1867) by William Baker and F. Stevenson, at 200 feet span this was briefly the widest roof in the world, In 1878–79 the train shed was doubled with the new span to the south of the existing one by E.W. Ives, being a copy of the earlier one.

The Midland Railway Warehouse now the National Conservation Centre was built in 1872 to designs of Henry Sumners of Culshaw and Sumners. The Engine house, 1849, at Edge Hill Station was Built for Liverpool and Manchester Railway Another survivor of the Victorian railway age is Exchange railway station, designed by John Hawkshaw, originally opened in 1850 as the terminus of the Lancashire and Yorkshire Railway, the current building was built between 1886 and 1888 by Henry Shelmerdine. St Michaels railway station to serve northern Aigburth, and Aigburth railway station to serve central Aigburth both opened 1864, were both originally part of the Garston and Liverpool Railway and later became part of the Cheshire Lines Committee. Cressington railway station that serves southern Aigburth and Hunts Cross railway station, are representative of the fine suburban railway stations built in 1873 for the Cheshire Lines Committee. 1886 would see the creation of Liverpool's first underground railway stations List of underground stations of the Merseyrail network, as part of what is now Mersey Railway, there was a necessity for a pumping station to keep the rail tunnel (opened 1886) under the River Mersey free of water, the one at the Liverpool end of the tunnel is located on Mann Island, it is now redundant. An unusual piece of infrastructure is the Wapping Tunnel by George Stephenson with construction between 1826 and 1829, when this was converted to use by steam trains several ventilation towers were built in the 1890s. The Liverpool Overhead Railway opened (1893) designed by Charles Douglas Fox and James Henry Greathead, demolished (1957–58), this early electric railway, at its greatest extent, stretched along the Docks from Seaforth & Litherland railway station to Dingle railway station.

In an age when transport was dominated by the railways, a rare example of a canal warehouse (1874) is found at 41 Bankhall Street, Kirkdale, used to transship goods for the Leeds and Liverpool canal.

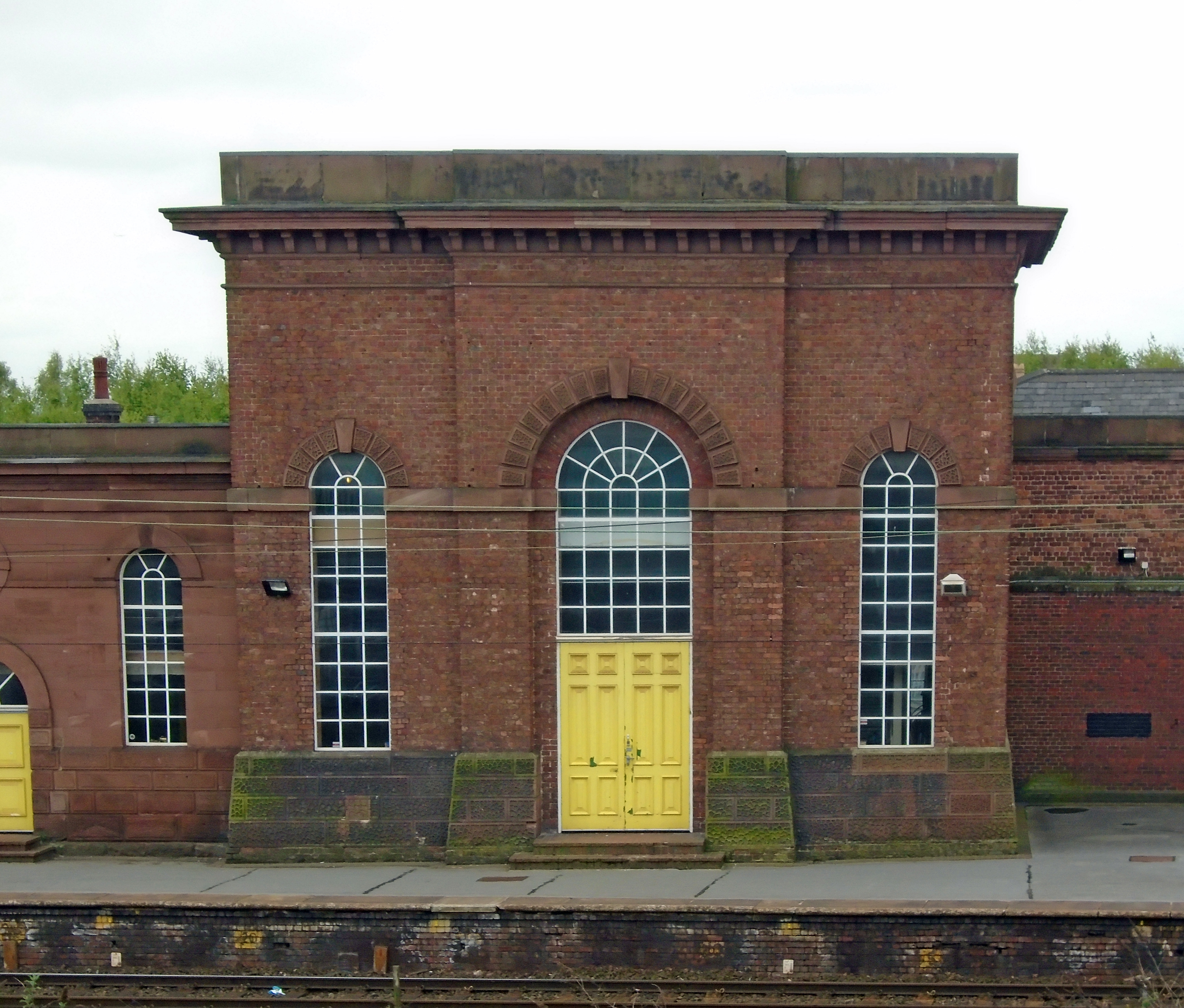
Engine house, Edge Hill Station
(1849; Grade II*)

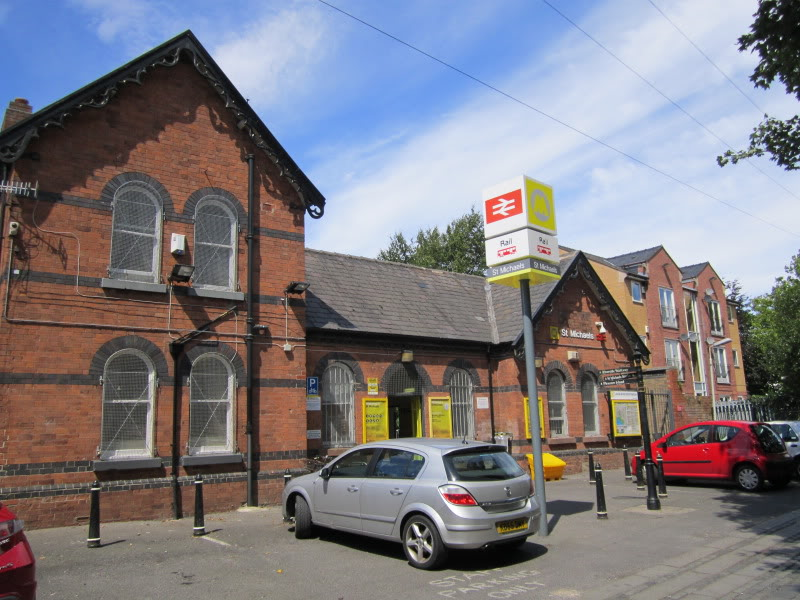
St Michaels railway station, Aigburth
(1864; unlisted)

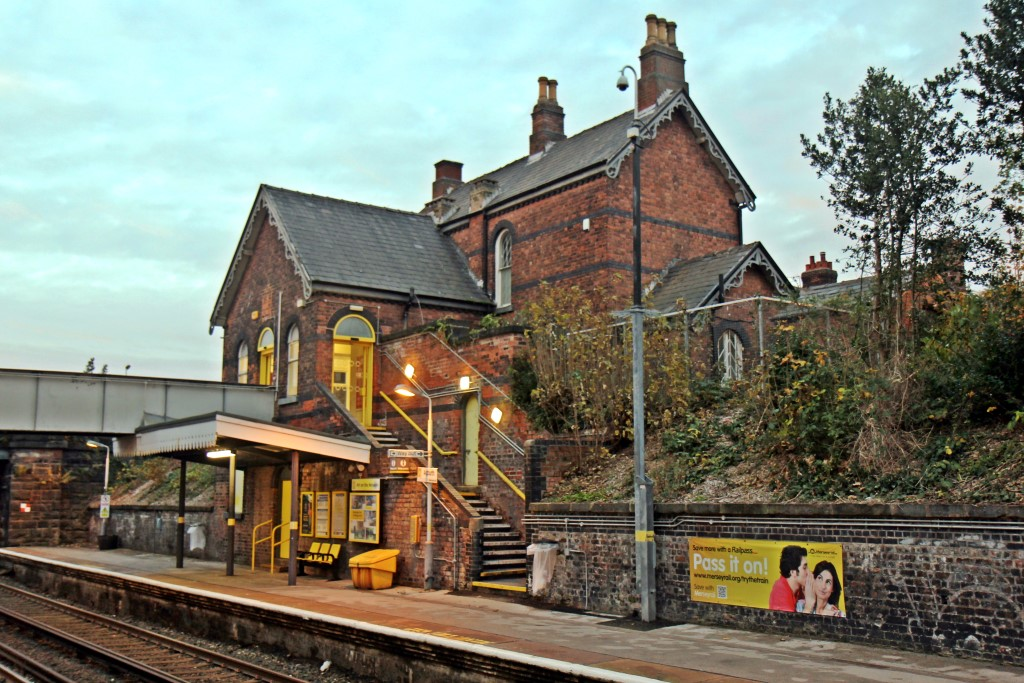
Aigburth railway station, Aigburth
(1864; unlisted)

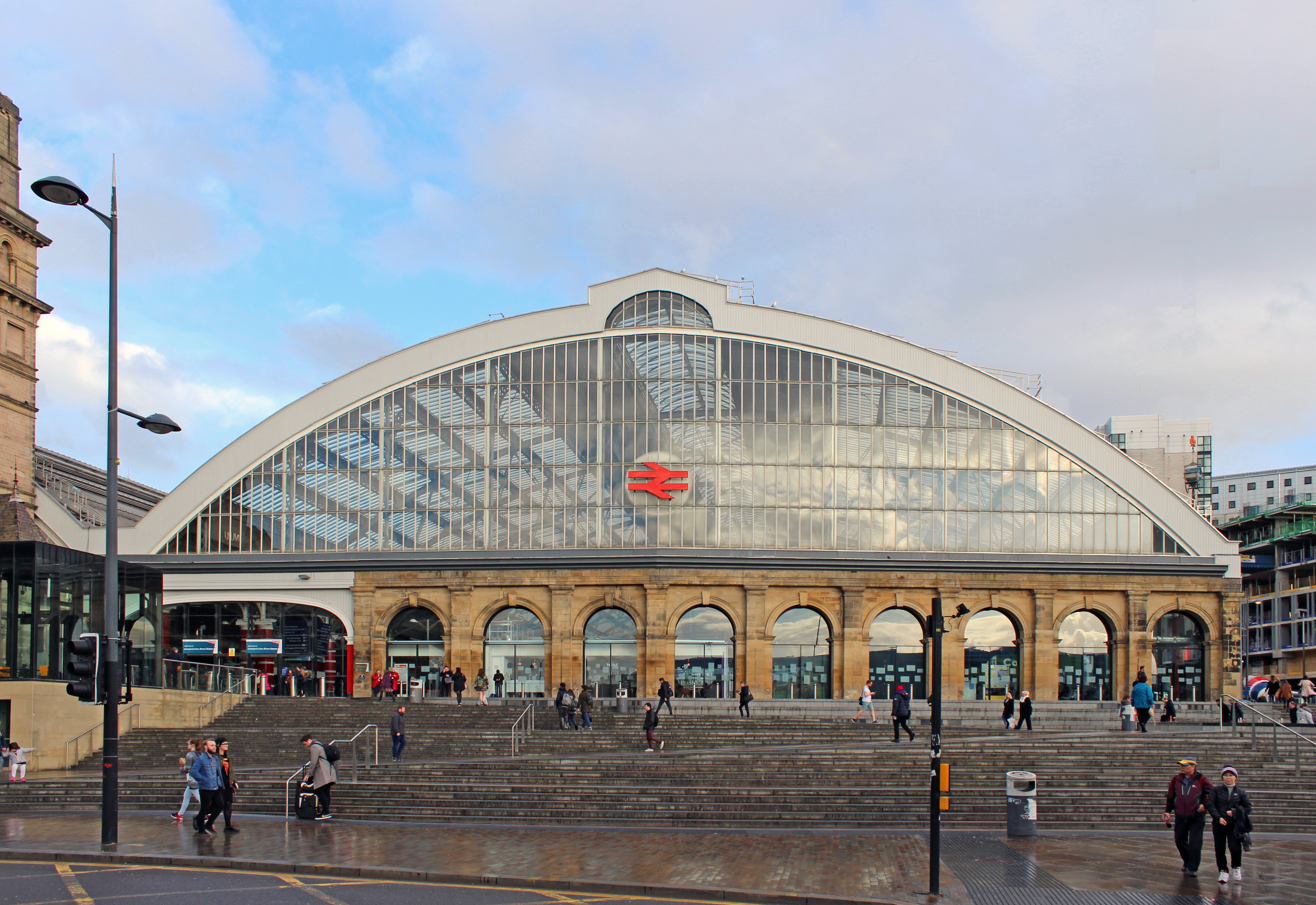
Liverpool Lime Street railway station
(1867–96 and 1879; Grade II)

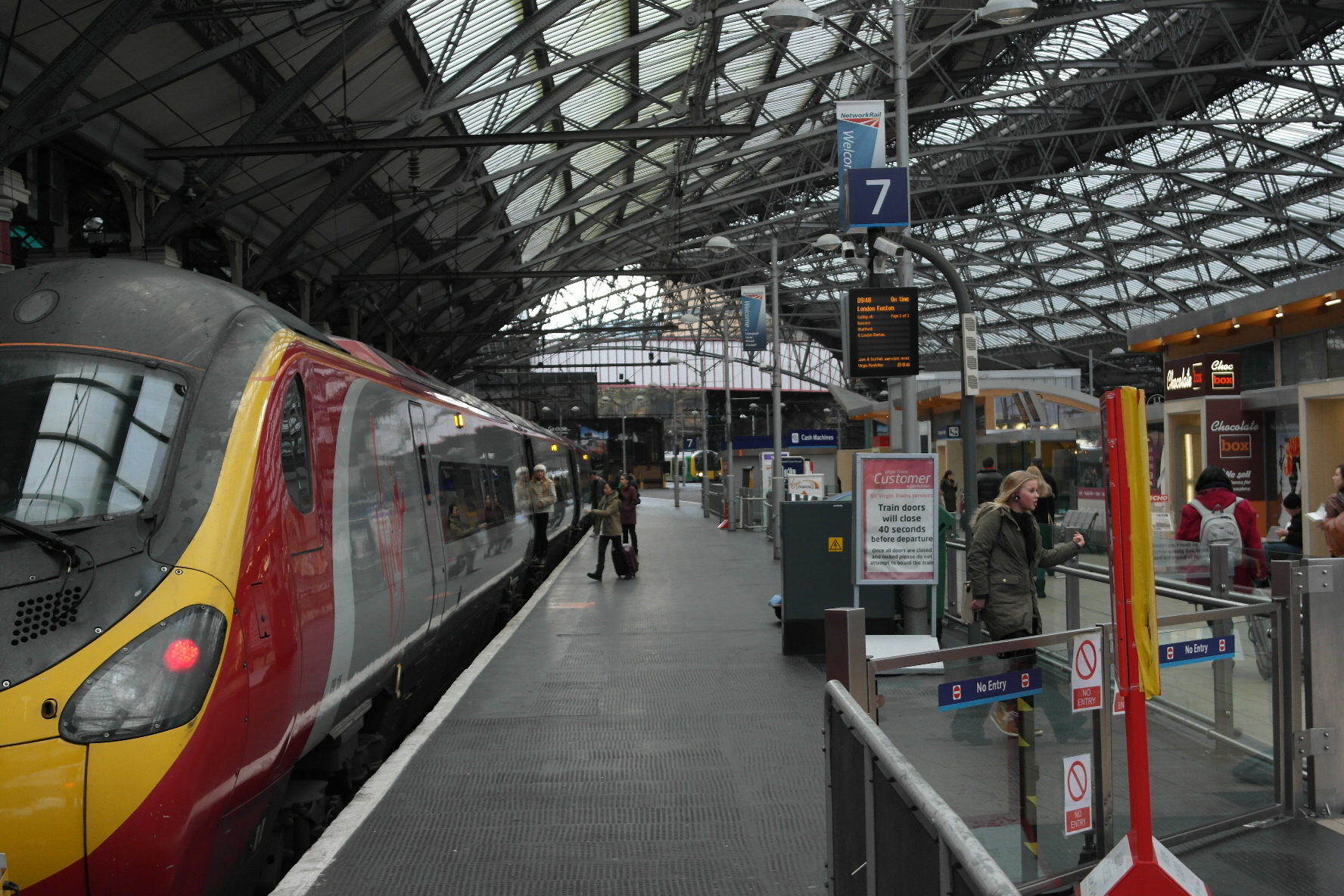
Train shed, Liverpool Lime Street railway station
(1867–96 and 1879; Grade II)

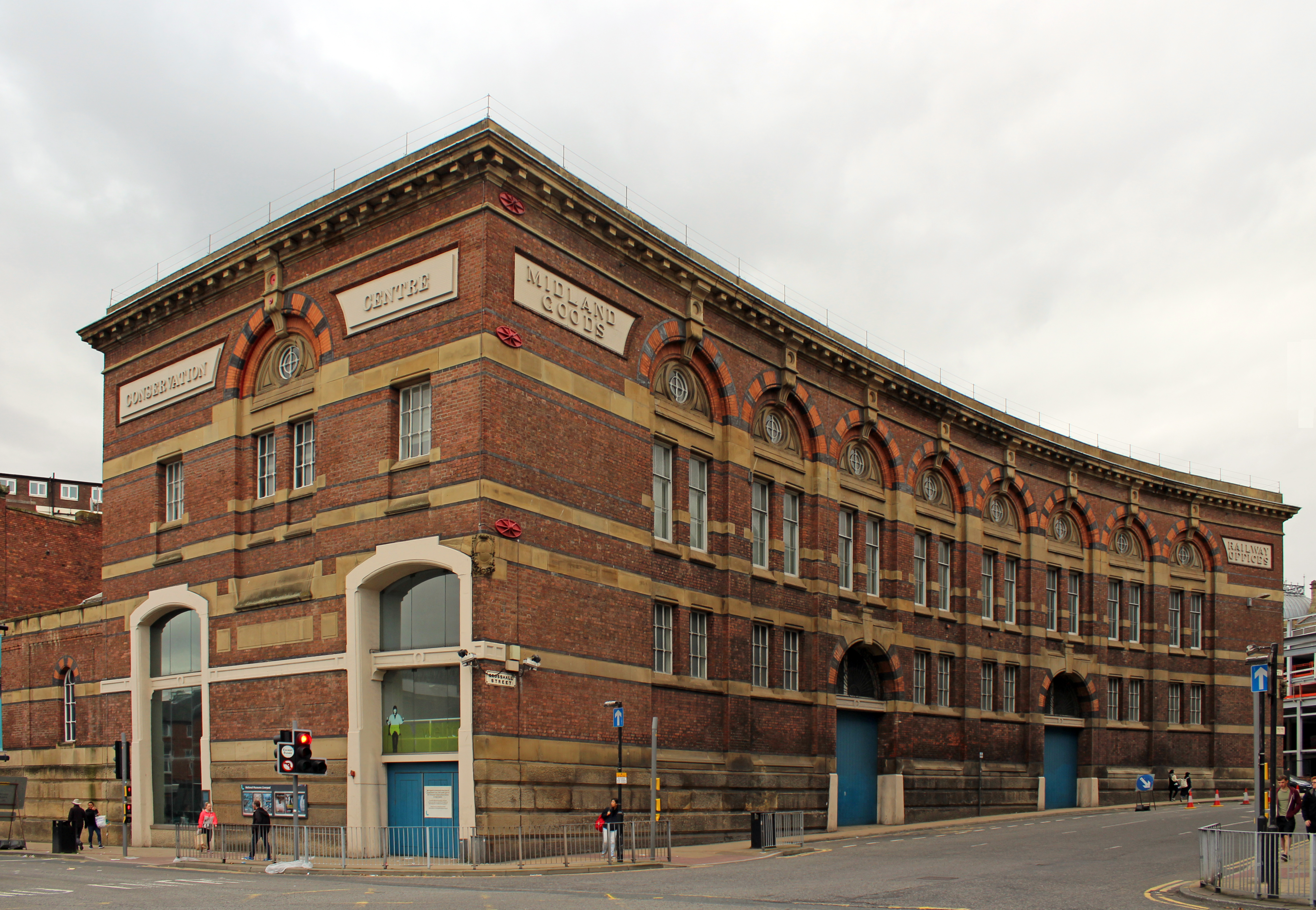
Midland Railway goods warehouse, Victoria Street
(1872; Grade II)

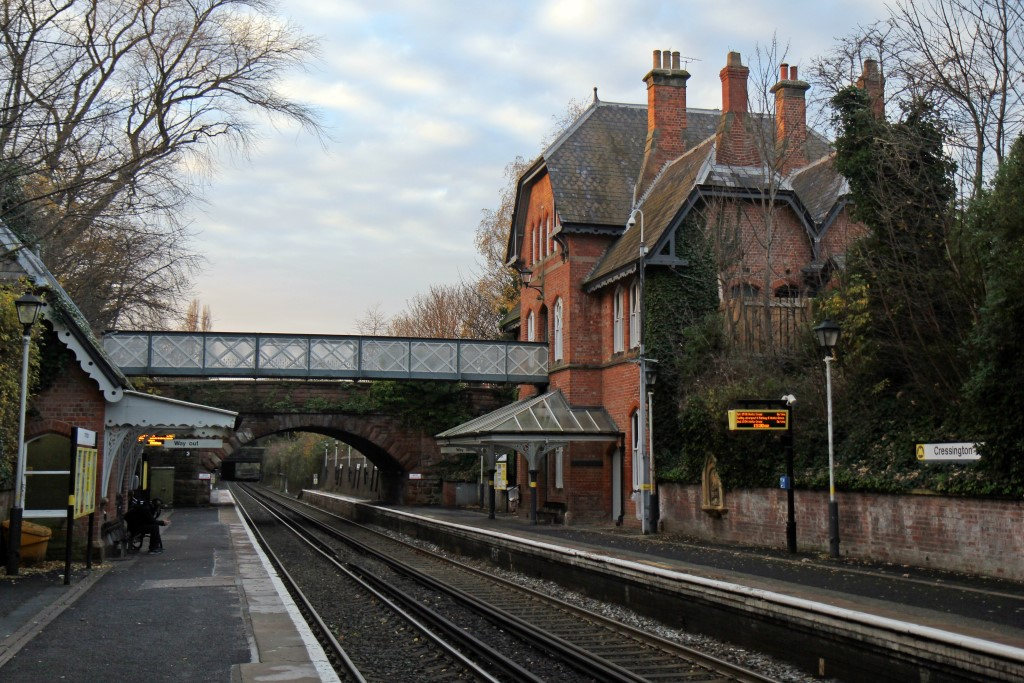
Cressington Railway Station, Aigburth
(1873; Grade II)

=== Victorian cemeteries and parks ===
English Heritage National Register of Historic Parks describes Merseyside's Victorian Parks as collectively the "most important in the country". The city of Liverpool has ten listed parks and cemeteries, including two Grade I and five Grade II*, more than any other English city apart from London.

The Victorian era saw the creation of many of the city's best parks. Prince's Park (1842–43; Grade II*), planned by Joseph Paxton and James Pennethorne covering 110 acres (45 hectares), was a private development by local industrialist Richard Vaughan Yates, and included the development of middle class housing surrounding the park; eighty years after its opening the City Council acquired it. There developed in the late 1860s the concept of a 'ribbon of parks' surrounding the centre of Liverpool; these were all paid for by the City Council: Newsham Park (1864–68; Grade II) by Edward Kemp; Stanley Park (1870; Grade II) by Edward Kemp, buildings for the park were designed by the corporation surveyor E.R. Robson; Sefton Park (1867–1872; Grade I) by Édouard André & Lewis Hornblower, covers 269 acres (109 hectares) the main building in Sefton Park is the Palm House (1896) by Mackenzie & Moncur paid for by Henry Yates Thompson, many of the buildings in Sefton Park are by the corporation surveyor Thomas Shelmerdine, for example the Ullet Road gates. Also by Mackenzie & Moncur is the Isla Gladstone Conservatory, Stanley Park.

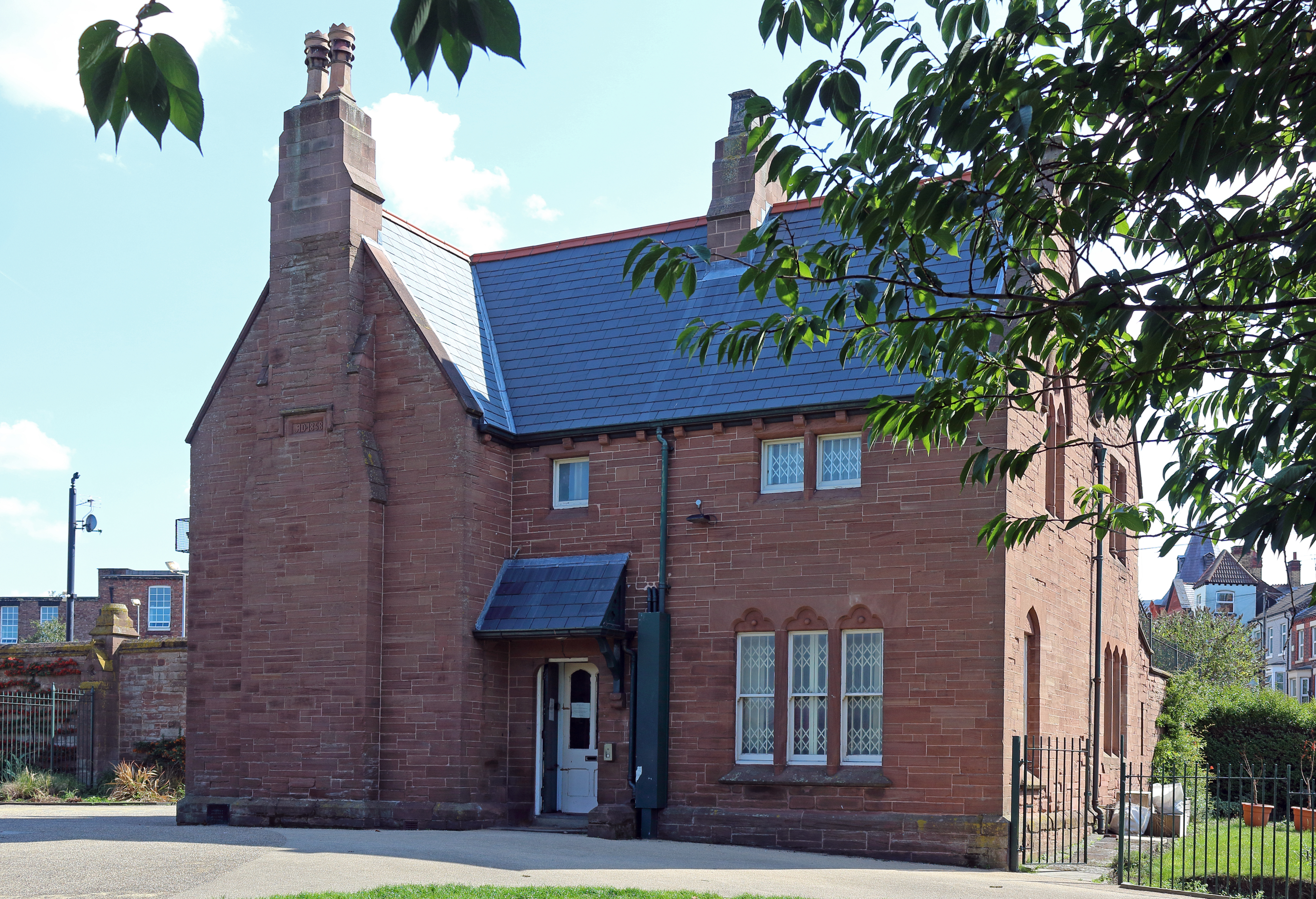
Lodge to Stanley Park, Anfield Road, Anfield
(1868; Grade II)

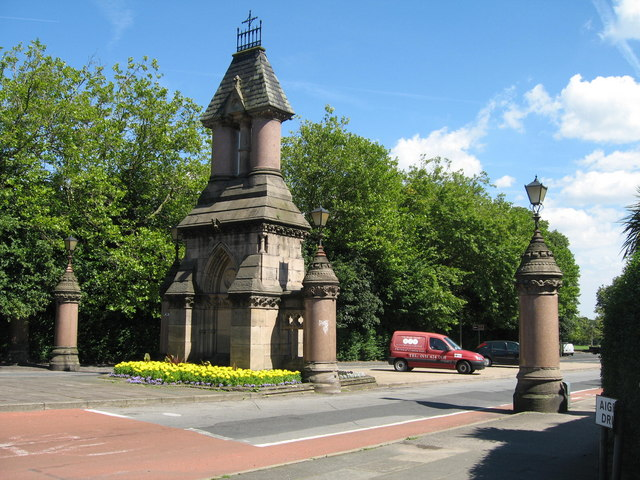
Gates Ullet Road, Sefton Park
(1871; Grade II)

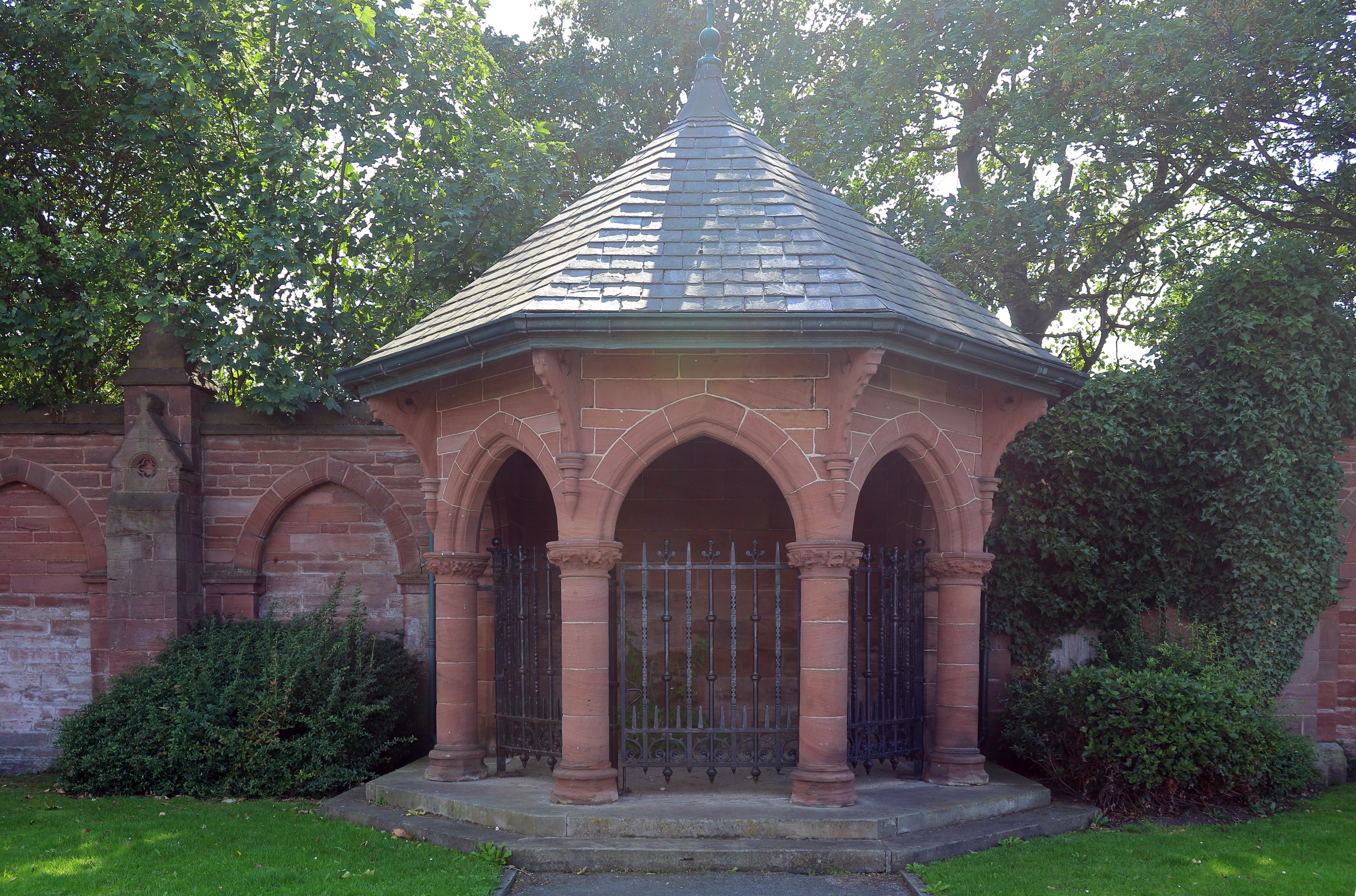
Western Shelter, Stanley Park
(c1870; Grade II)

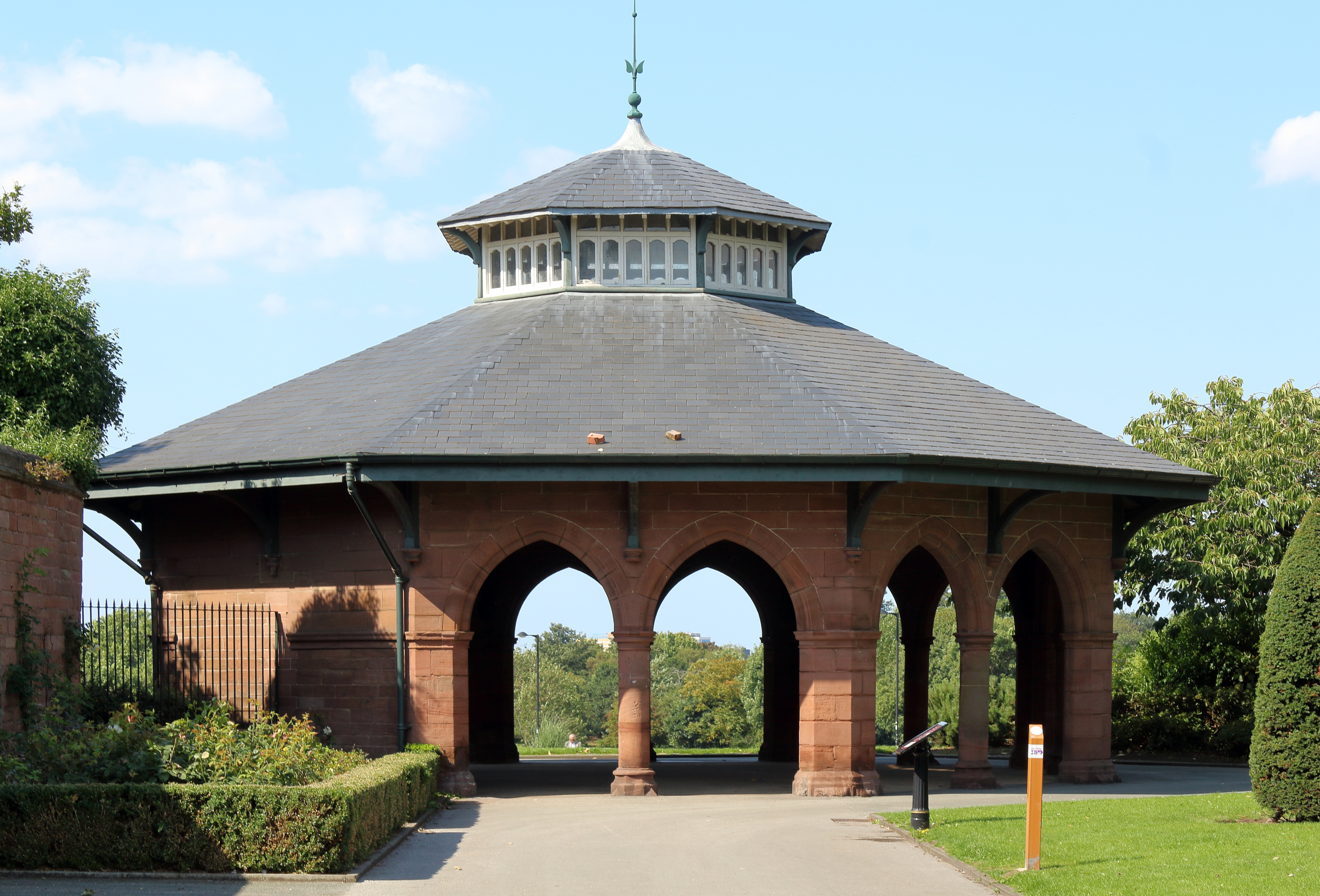
Pavilion at the east end of the screen wall, Stanley Park
(c1870; Grade II)

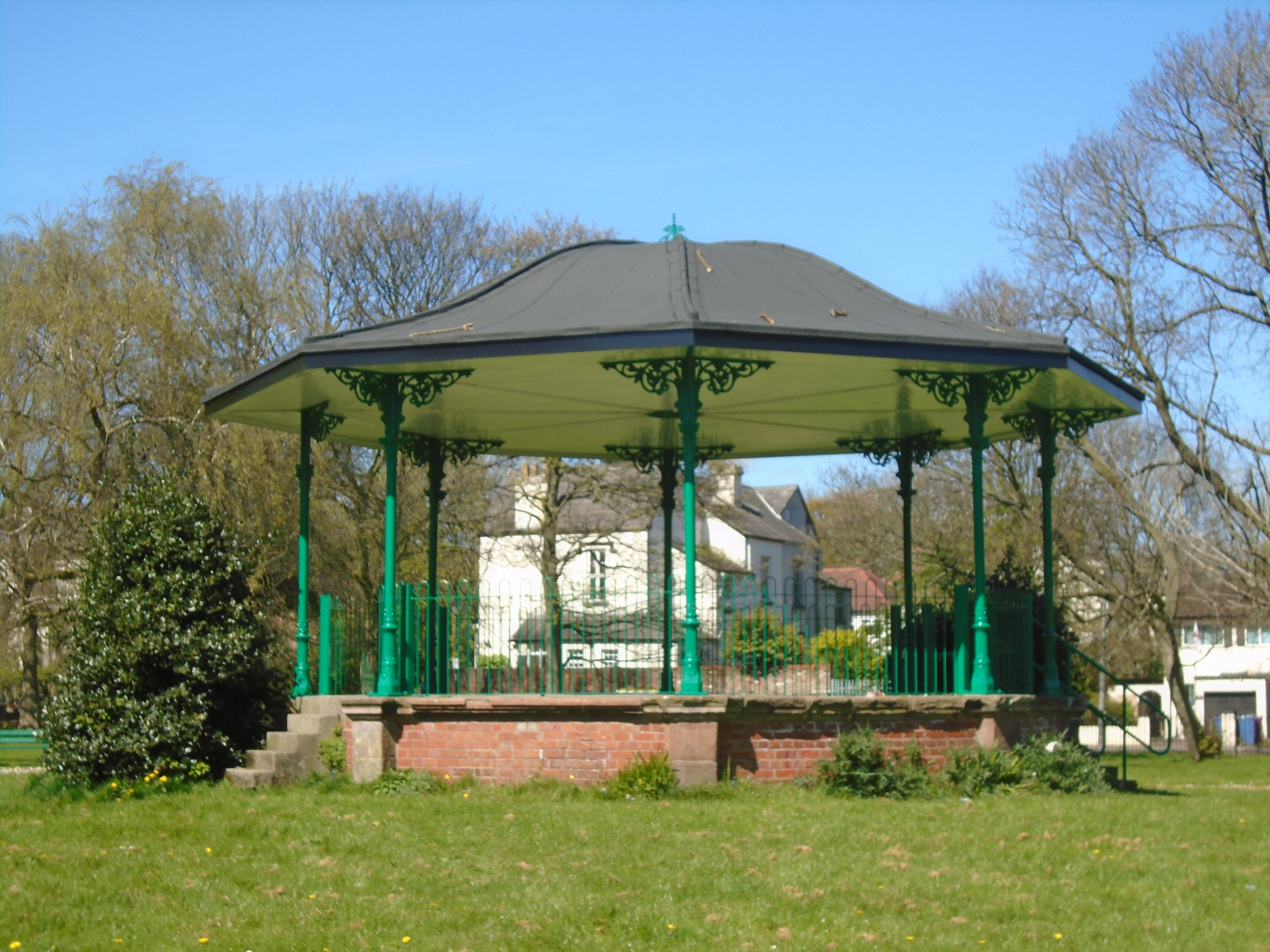
Newsham Park Bandstand
(1880s; Grade II)

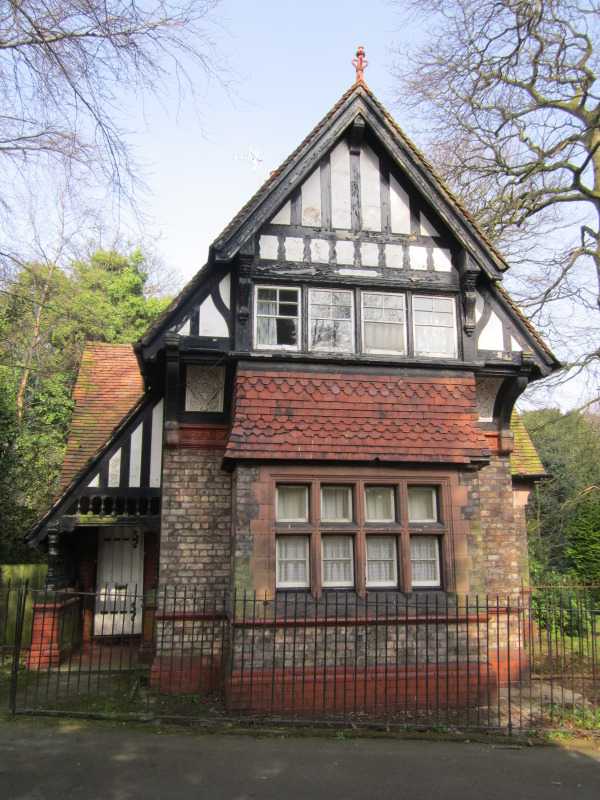
Lodge, Reynolds Park, Church Road, Woolton
(1883; Grade II)

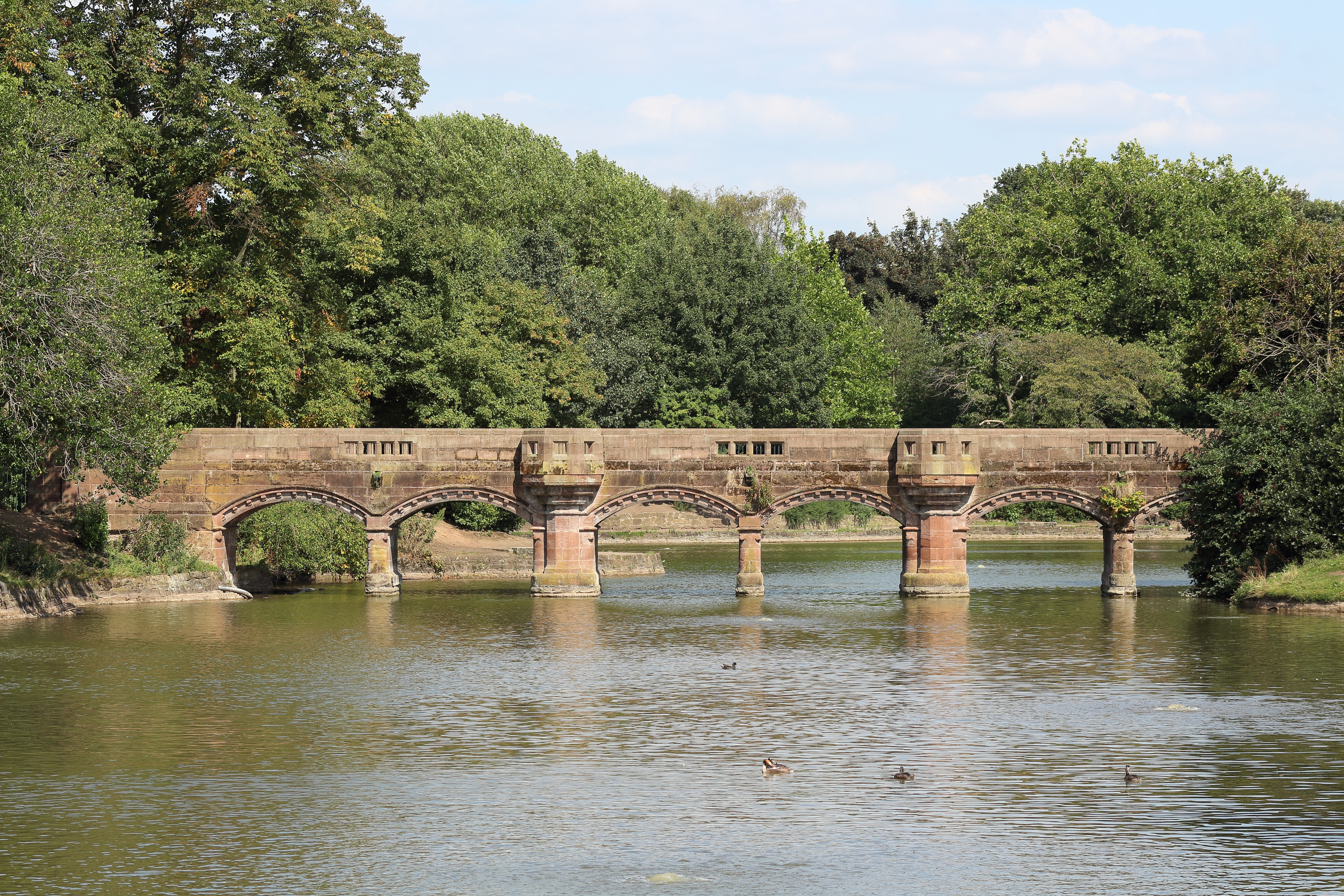
Bridge, Stanley Park
(late 19th century; Grade II)

The best cemeteries for Victorian architecture are Toxteth Park Cemetery established 1855–56, the architect was Thomas D Barry, landscaping by William Gay, listed Grade II and Anfield Cemetery that was laid out 1856–63, covering 140 acres (57 hectares) the cemetery landscape is listed Grade II* and was the work of Edward Kemp, many of the buildings, including entrance lodges, Lansdowne House used as the registrar's offices, chapels only the non-conformist chapel survives (the Anglican chapel has been demolished) and the catacombs are by architects Lucy & Littler and monuments have individual listings. For example, the McLennan monument is in the Egyptian revival style and is listed grade II. Everton Cemetery was the layout and buildings designed by Thomas D. Barry and Sons. West Derby Cemetery opened (1884) has a fine entrance lodge, the landscape is Grade II by William Wortley and the architect was F. Bartram Payton. One of the first Crematoria (1894–96) in the country is in Anfield Cemetery, designed by James Rhind.

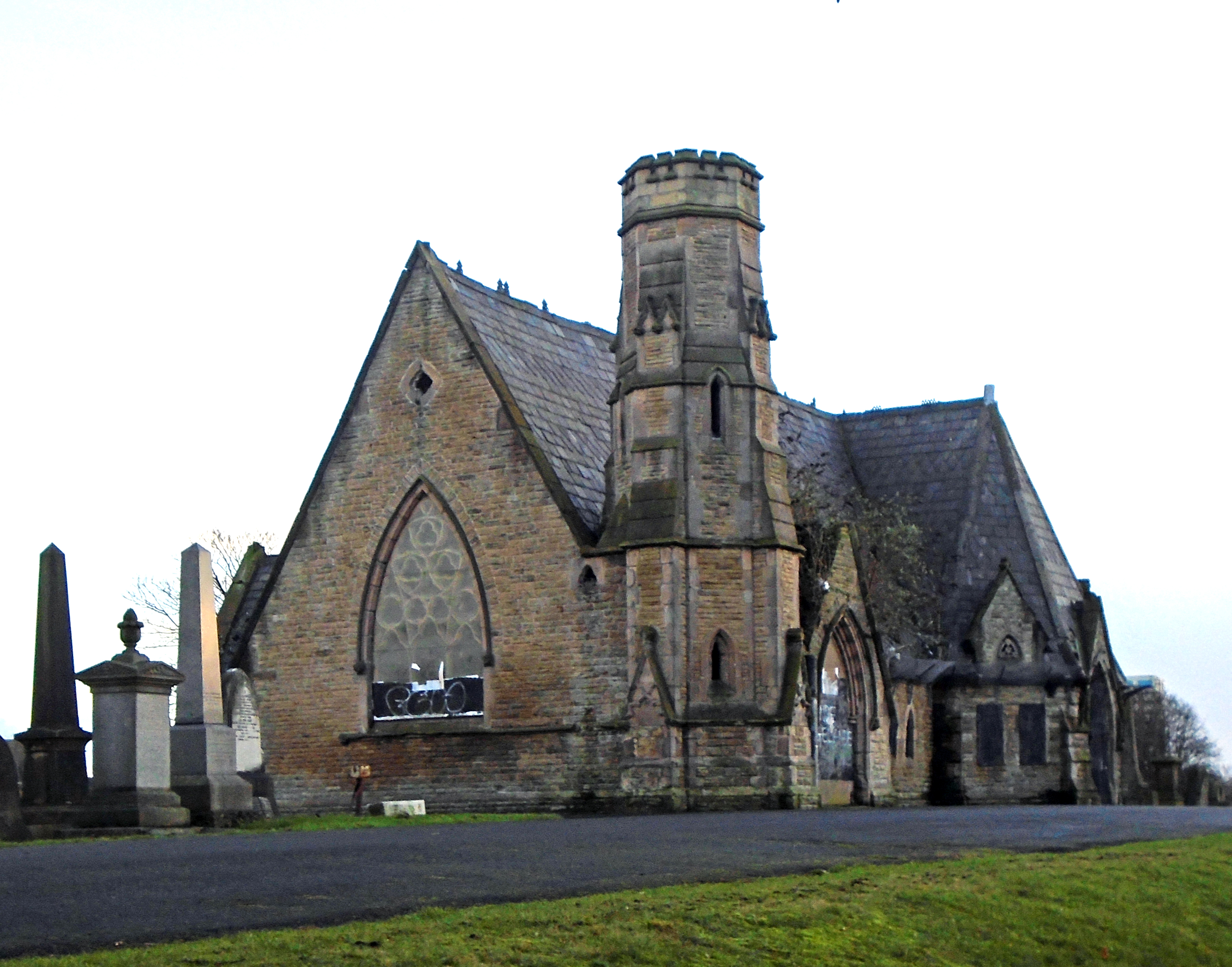
Anglican Chapel, Toxteth Park Cemetery
(1855–56; Grade II)

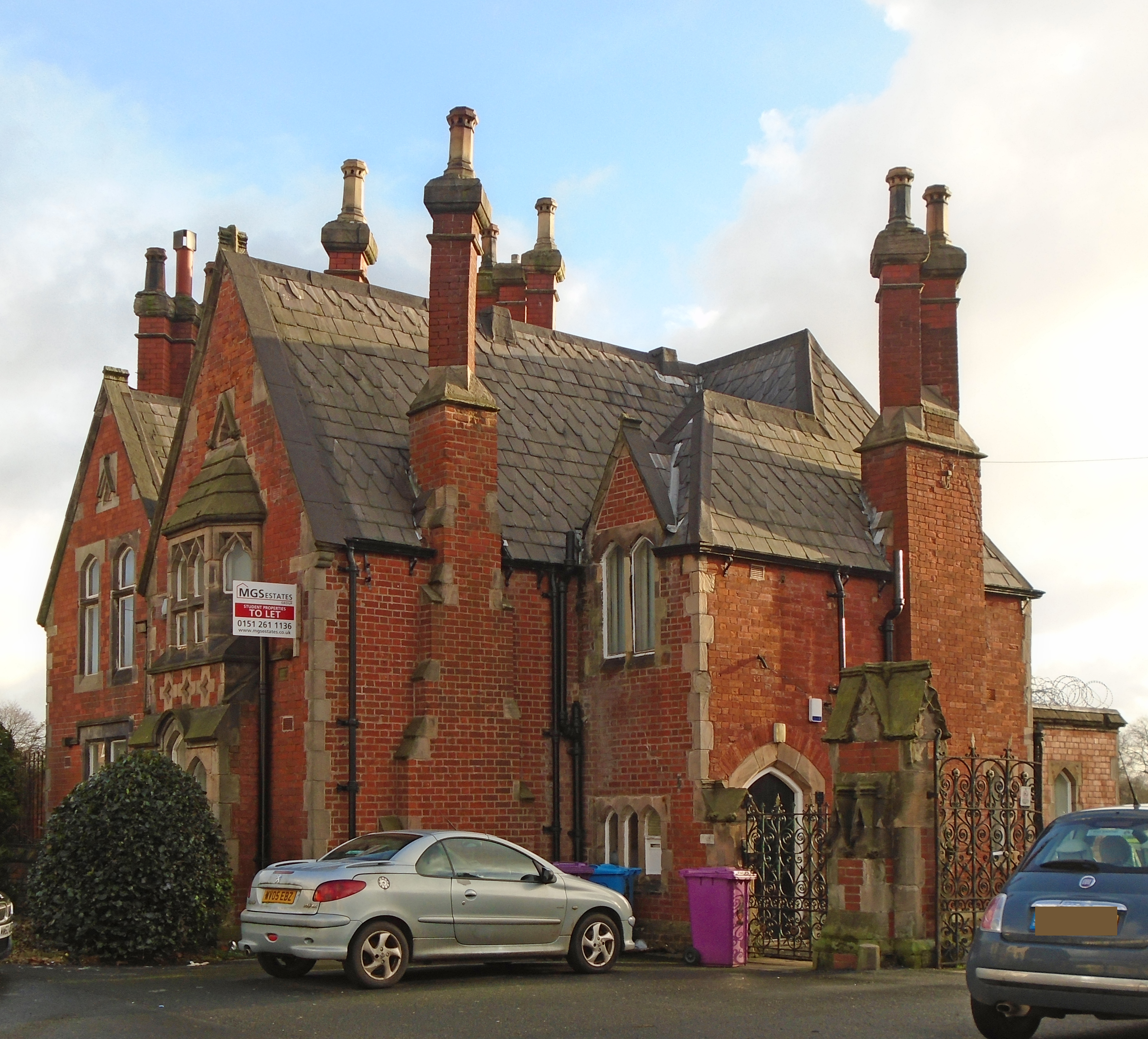
The Eastern Lodge, main entrance, Toxteth Park Cemetery
(1856; Grade II)

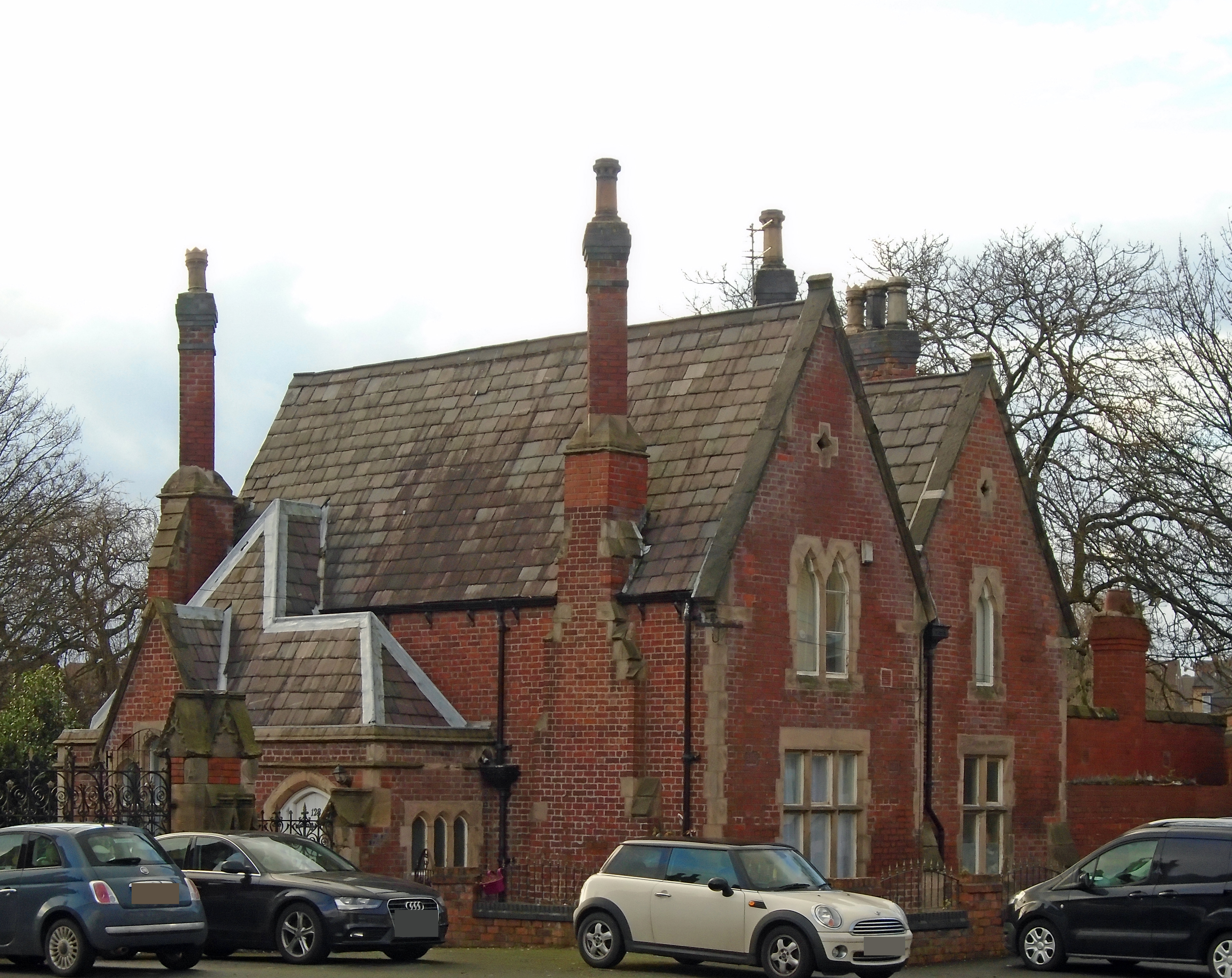
The Western Lodge, main entrance, Toxteth Park Cemetery
(1856; Grade II)

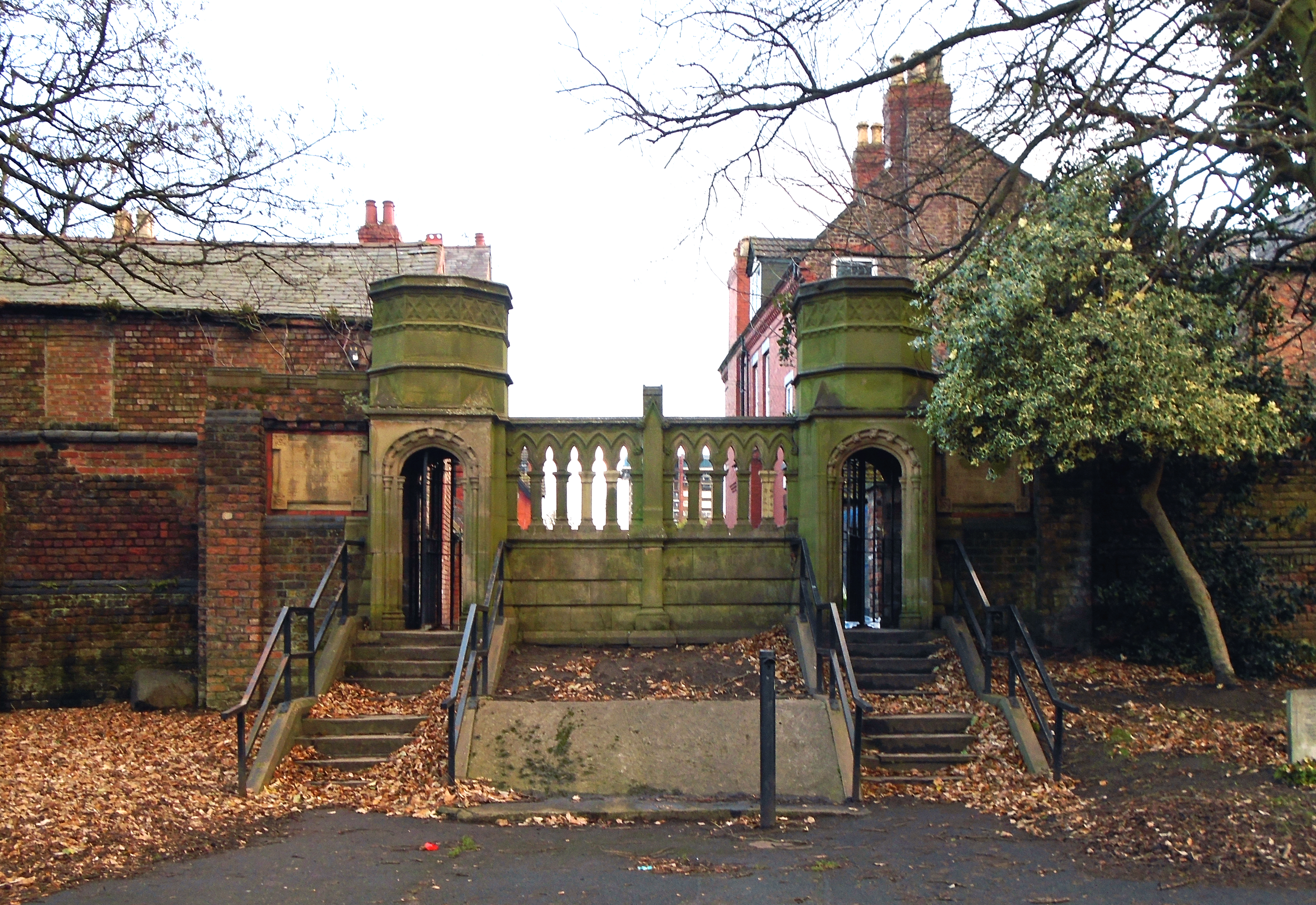
Arundel Avenue entrance to Toxteth Park Cemetery
(1856; Grade II)

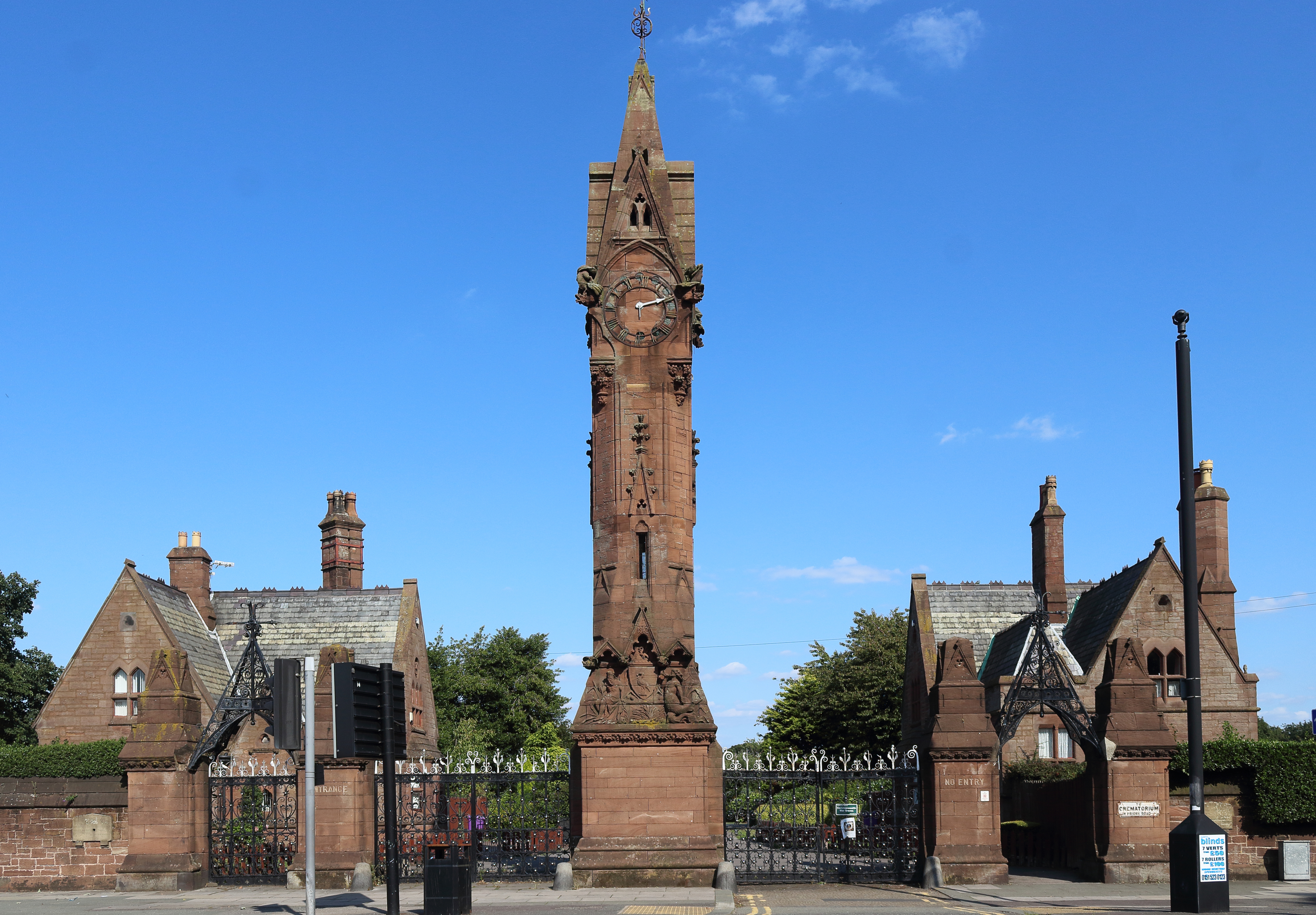
Main entrance, Anfield Cemetery
(1862; Grade II)

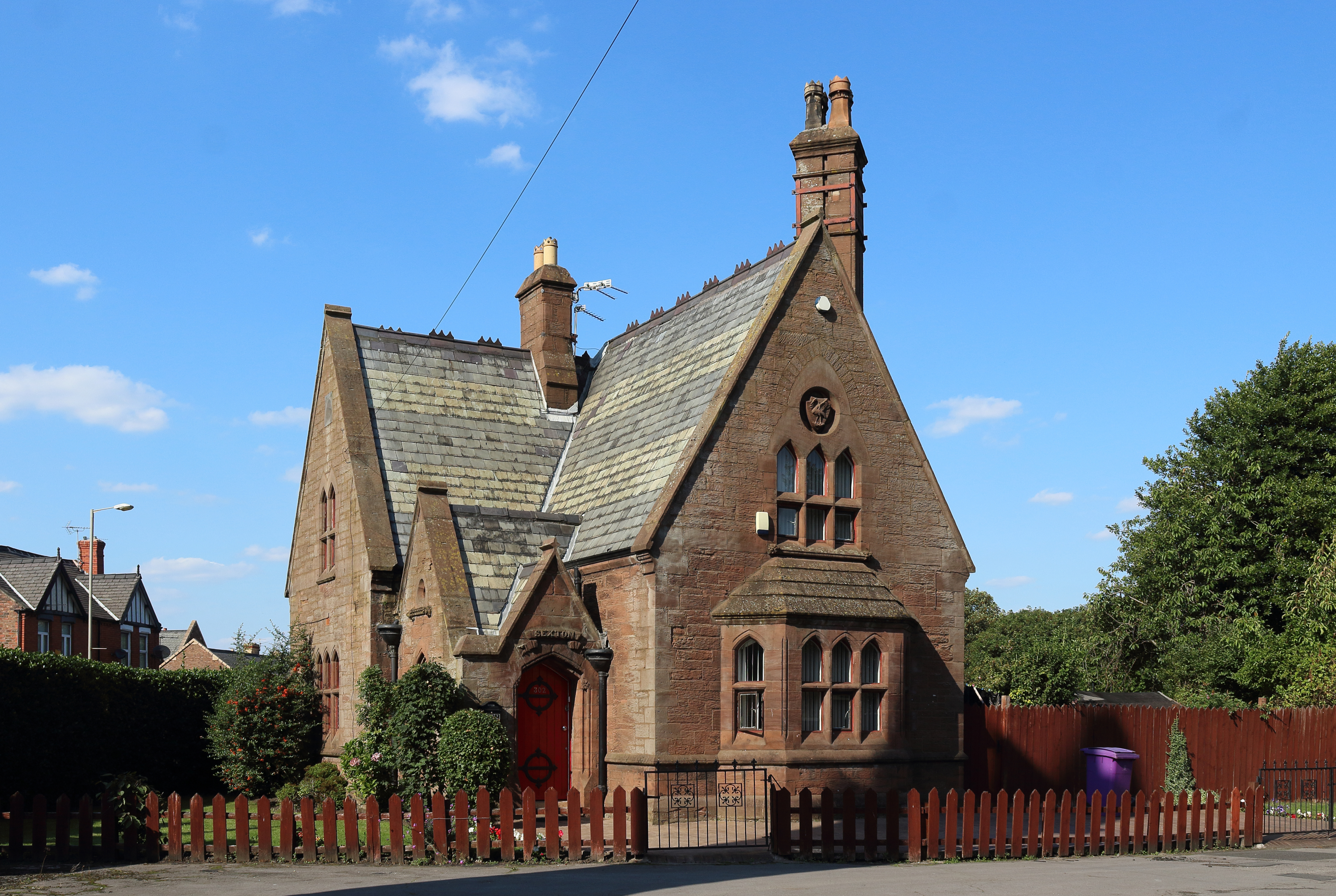
North Lodge, Anfield Cemetery
(1862; Grade II)

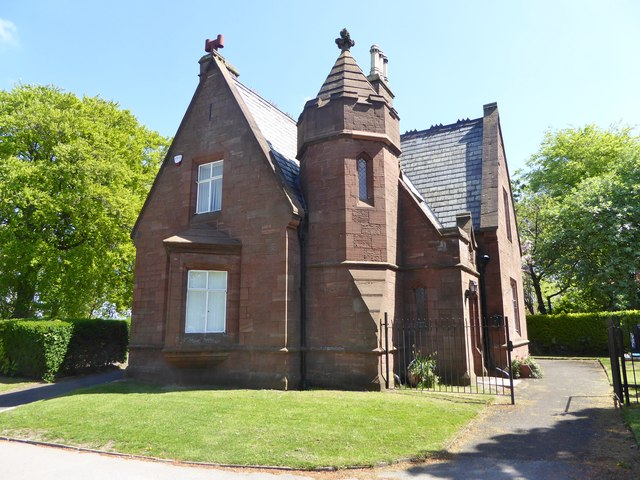
Priory Lodge, Anfield Cemetery
(1862; Grade II)

=== Victorian buildings for entertainment, sport & leisure ===
In Lord Nelson Street is the former Socialist Hall of Science, part of an Owenite group, later used as a concert hall. The Lamb Hotel, High Street, Wavertree, looks Georgian but was built in the 1850s. Marlborough House (1852–53), #52, Bold Street, on the corner of Bold Street and Concert Street, the ground floor was shops the upper floors functioned as a Music hall, by Arthur Hill Holme. The oldest extant theatre in the city is the Liverpool Playhouse, originally built 1866, remodelled 1895 and a new auditorium built-in 1911 by Stanley Davenport Adshead. The Philharmonic Dining Rooms on Hope Street built (c. 1898 – 1900) designed by Walter W. Thomas, not only have a flamboyant exterior with Art Nouveau style ironwork and intricate internal decor but are also noteworthy for their ornate Victorian toilets, which have become a tourist attraction in their own right. The former Reform Club (1879) home to the Liberal Party in Liverpool, by Edmund Kirkby, is a red brick palazzo, also in Dale Street the former Conservative Club (1880–83), centre of the Conservative Party in Liverpool, was designed by F & G Holme in the French Second Empire style. The Masonic Hall (1872) on Hope Street by Danson & Davies, in the style of an Italian palazzo. Swimming baths of this era that survive in the city are Steble Street Baths (1874), Toxteth and Woolton Baths (1893), Quarry Street South, designed by Horton & Bridgford of Manchester. The pavilion of Aigburth Cricket Ground (c.1880–82) was designed by Thomas Harnett Harrison.

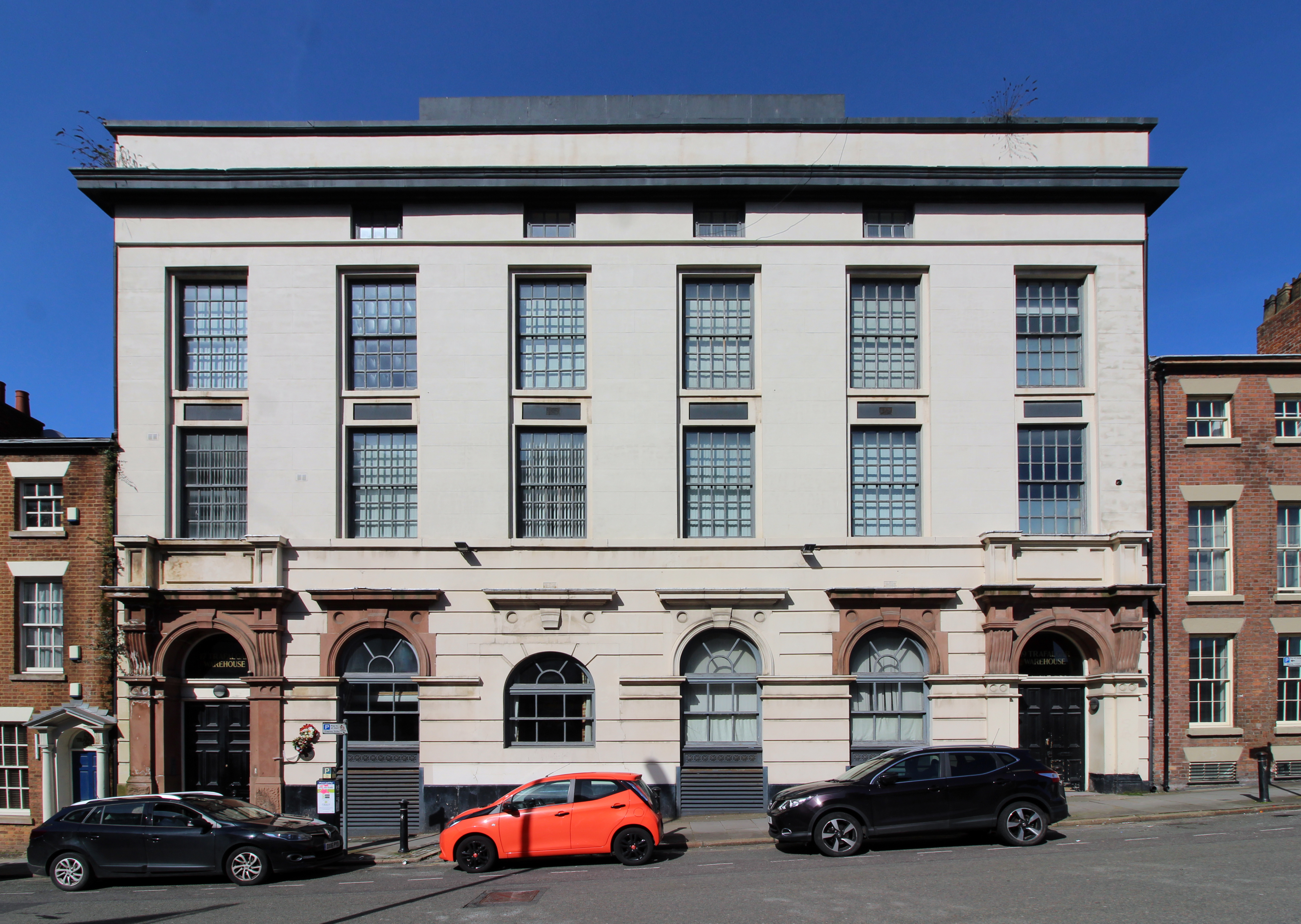
Former Socialist Hall of Science, later concert hall, 17-19 Lord Nelson Street
(c.1840; Grade II)

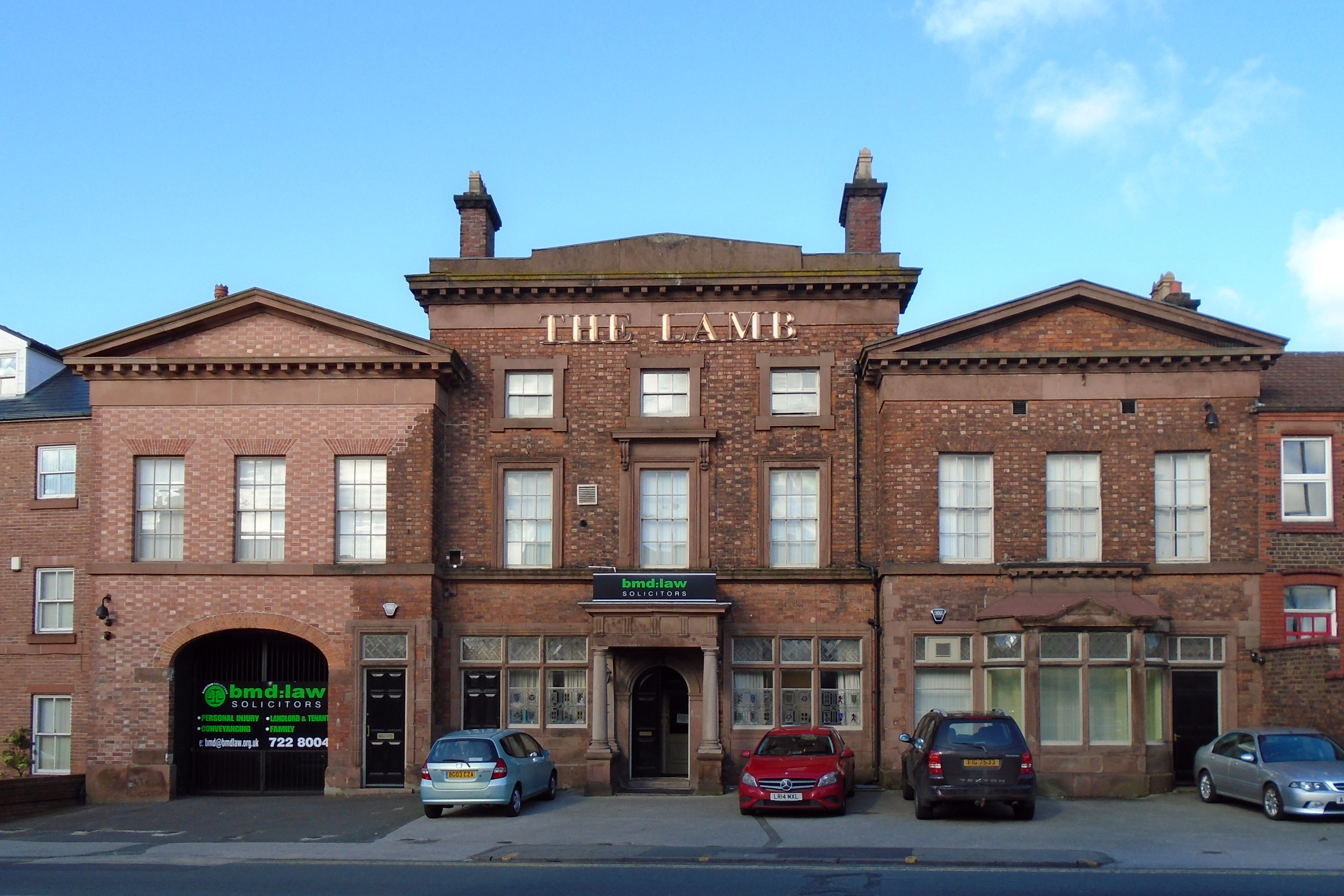
The Lamb Hotel, High Street, Wavertree
(1850s; Grade II)

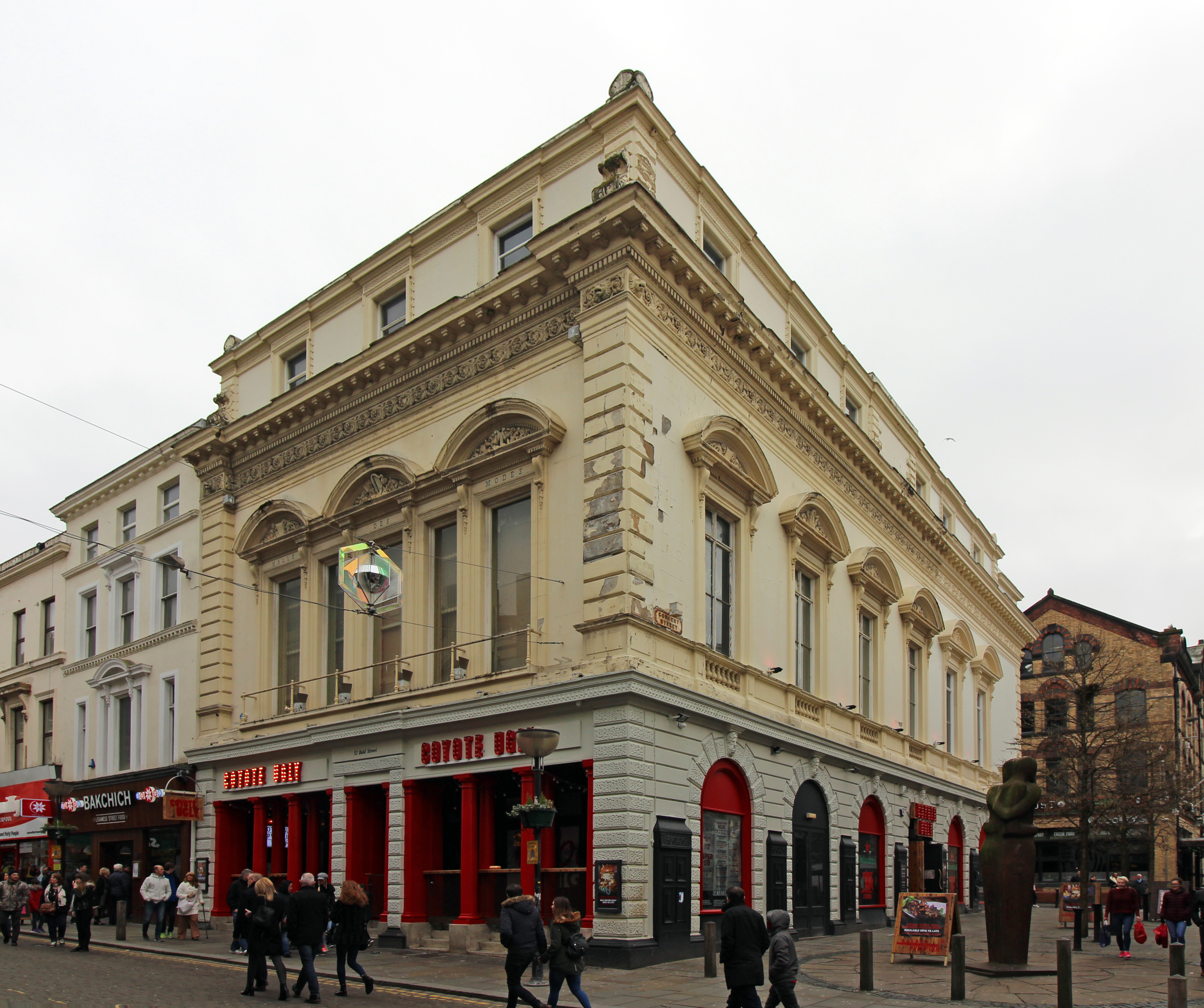
Former Music Hall Marlborough House, Bold Street, by Arthur Hill Holme
(1853; Grade II)

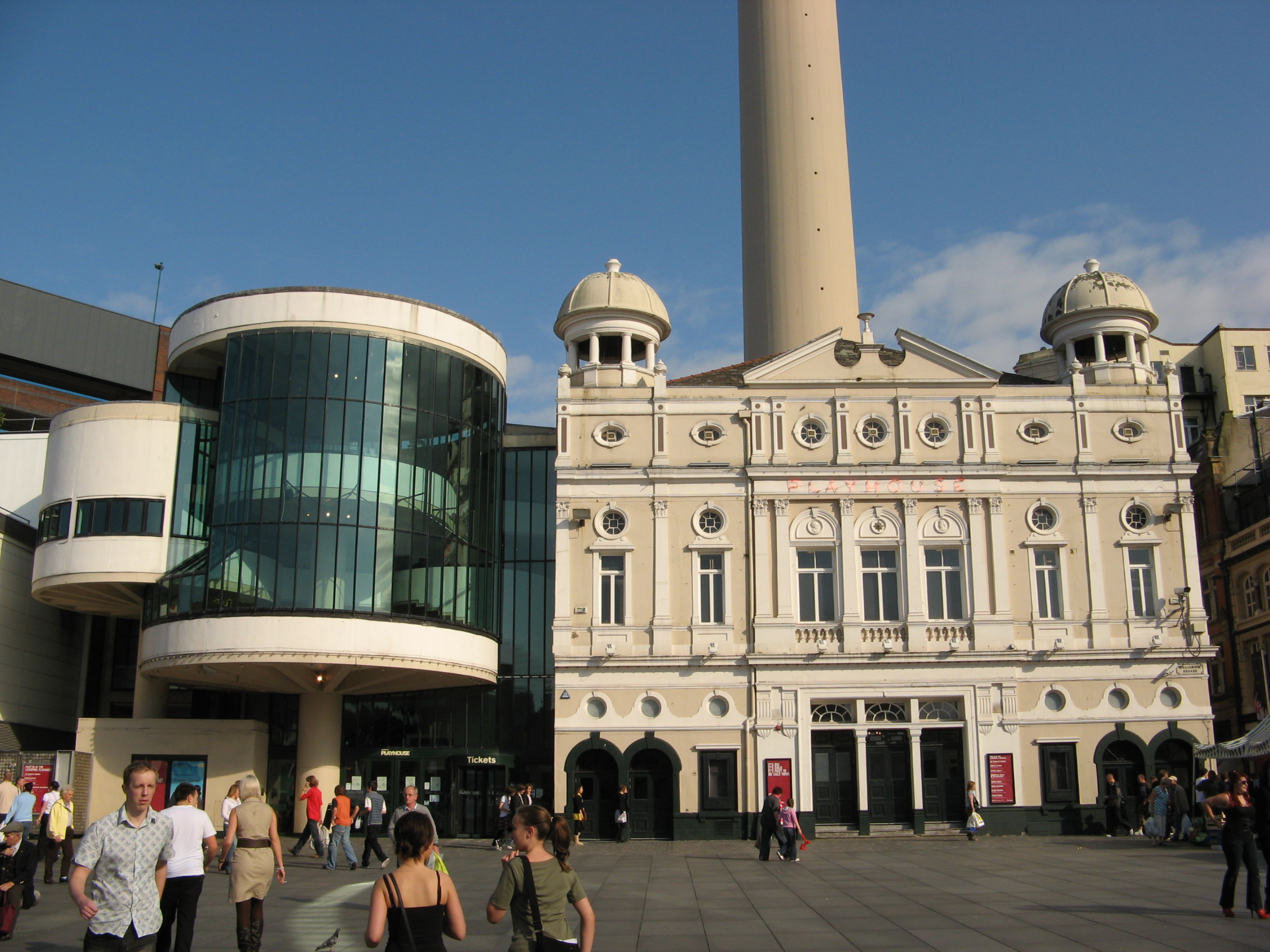
Playhouse Theatre, Williamson Square
(1866; Grade II*)
(modern extension 1968)

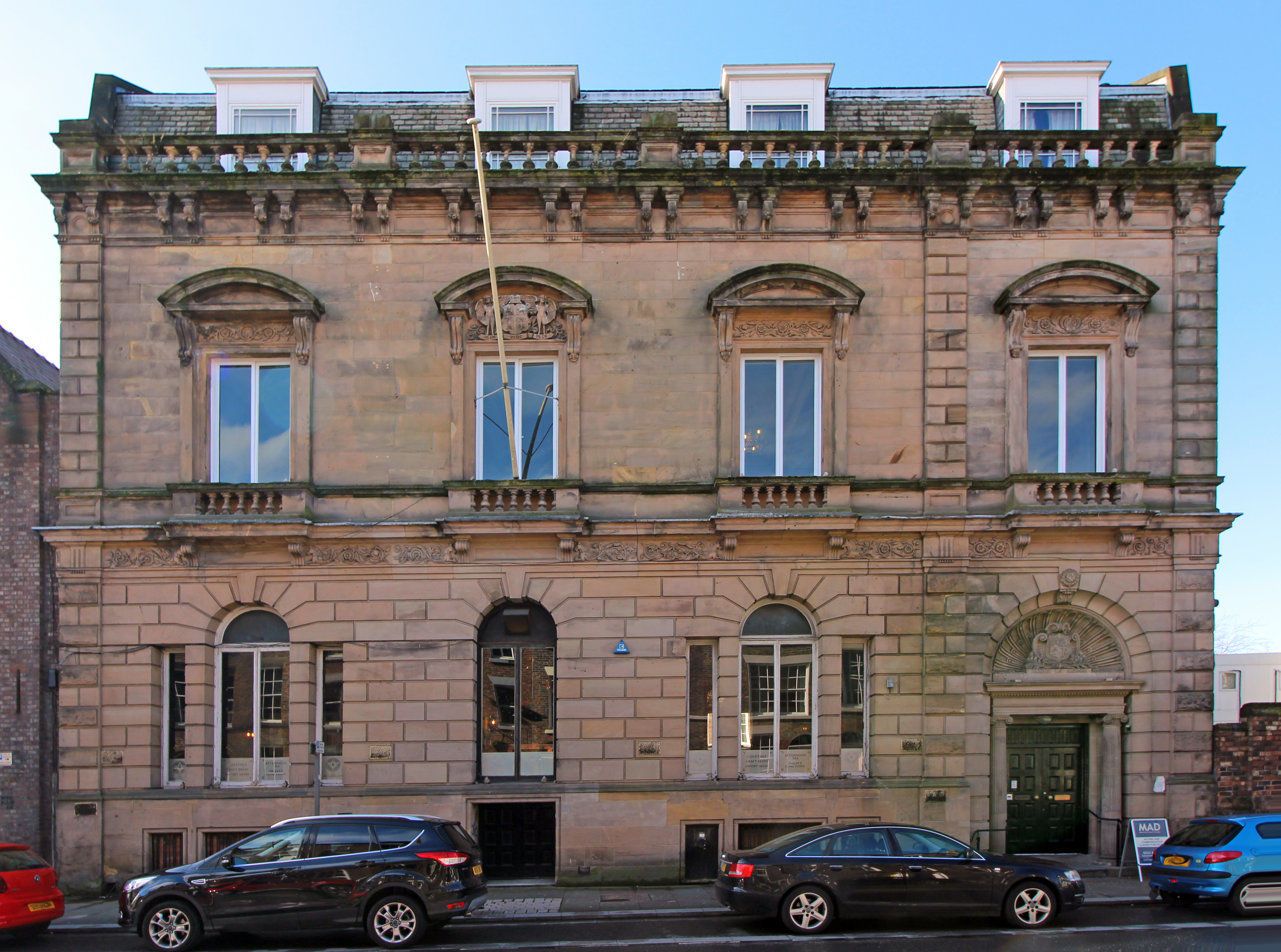
Masonic Hall, Hope Street
(1872; Grade II)

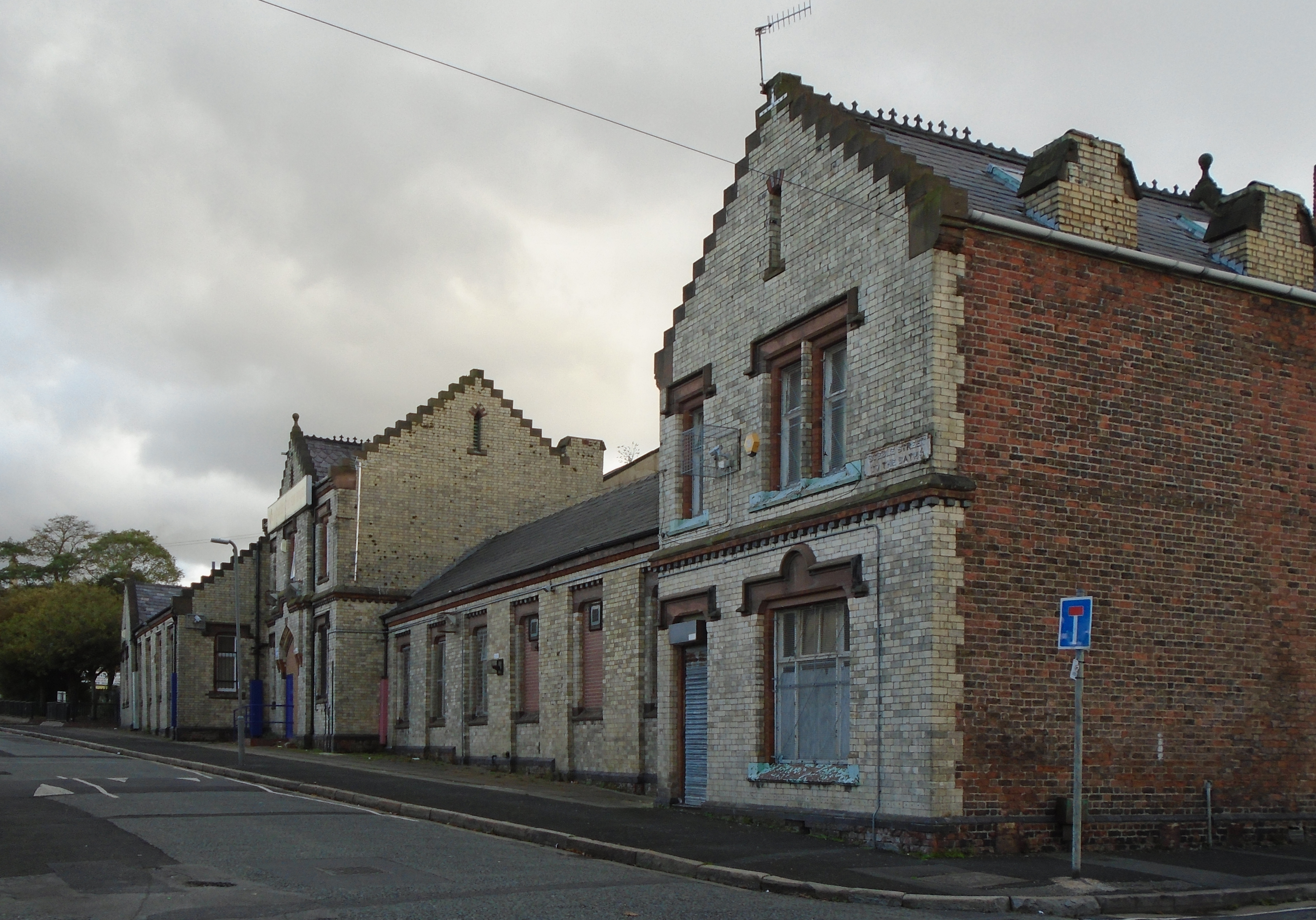
Steble Street Baths, Toxteth
(1874; unlisted)

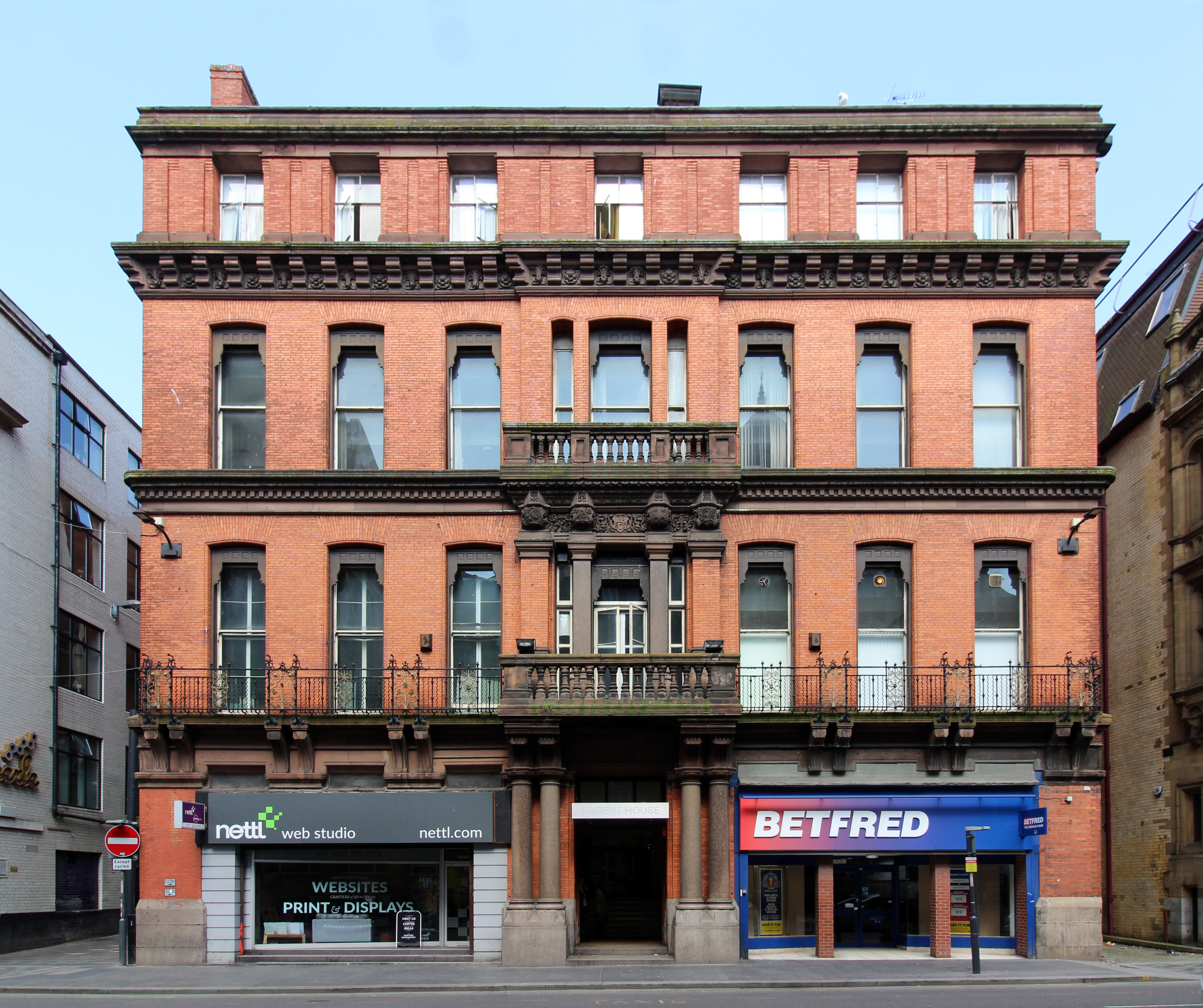
Former Reform Club, 31 Dale Street
(1879; Grade II)

=== Victorian industrial buildings ===
Liverpool's industries largely depended on goods imports through the docks, for example, sugar for Hartley's Jam Factory. Partially surviving Victorian industrial buildings include: Heap's Rice Mill was a rice processing mill and warehouse complex, early-mid-19th century, with late-19th and early 20th century additions and alterations, using rice from Burma and south-east Asia. The former Gateacre Brewery was constructed c.1867. The former Higsons Brewery on Stanhope Street dates from 1887 by James Redford, it was extended in 1902, in bold red brick and terracotta decoration in a Renaissance style, it was built for Robert Cain who also commissioned the Philharmonic Dining Rooms and The Vines Pub. The former Hartley's Jam Factory, built 1886 to designs by James F. Doyle for William Pickles Hartley The former Ogden's Tobacco Factory (1900), in Boundary Lane, Everton was designed by Henry Hartley. The surviving former office block with its clock tower is now apartments, the rest of the factory has been demolished and replaced by housing.

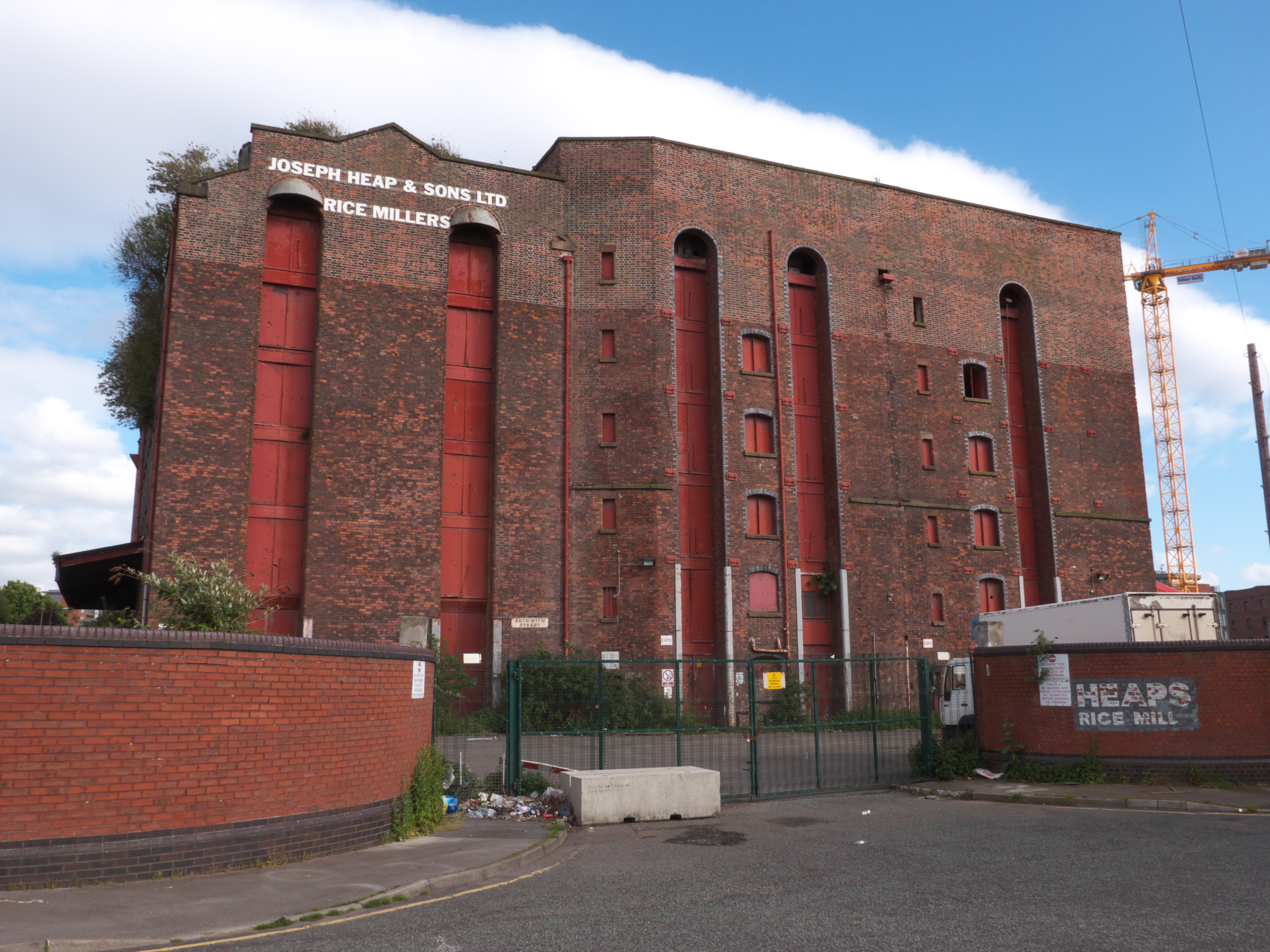
Heap's Rice Mill, Beckwith Street
(early-mid 19th century; Grade II)

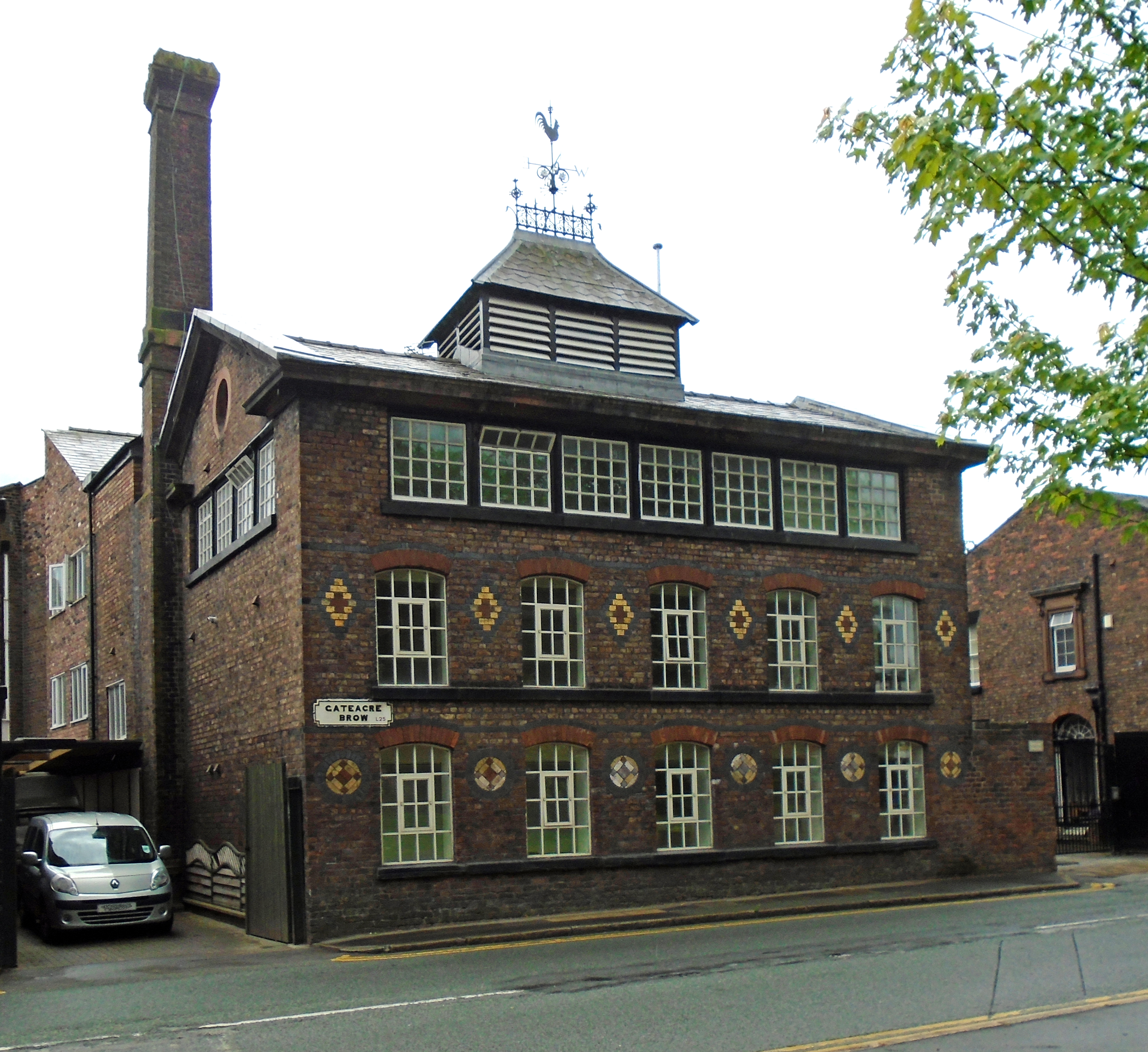
Former Gateacre Brewery, Gateacre Brow, Gateacre
(c.1867; Grade II)

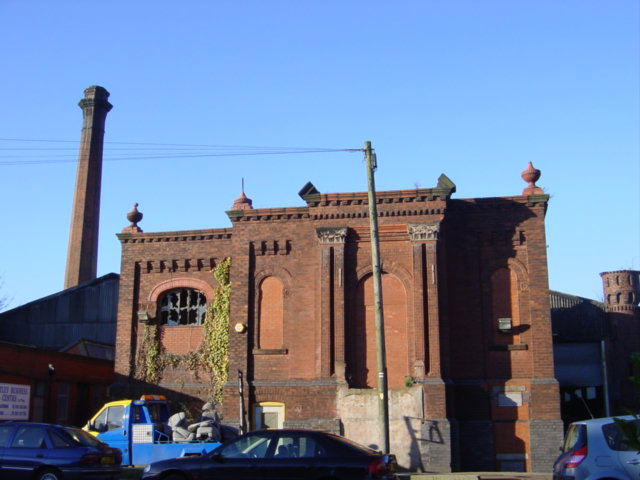
Former Hartley's Jam Factory, Long Lane, Fazakerley
(1886; Grade II)

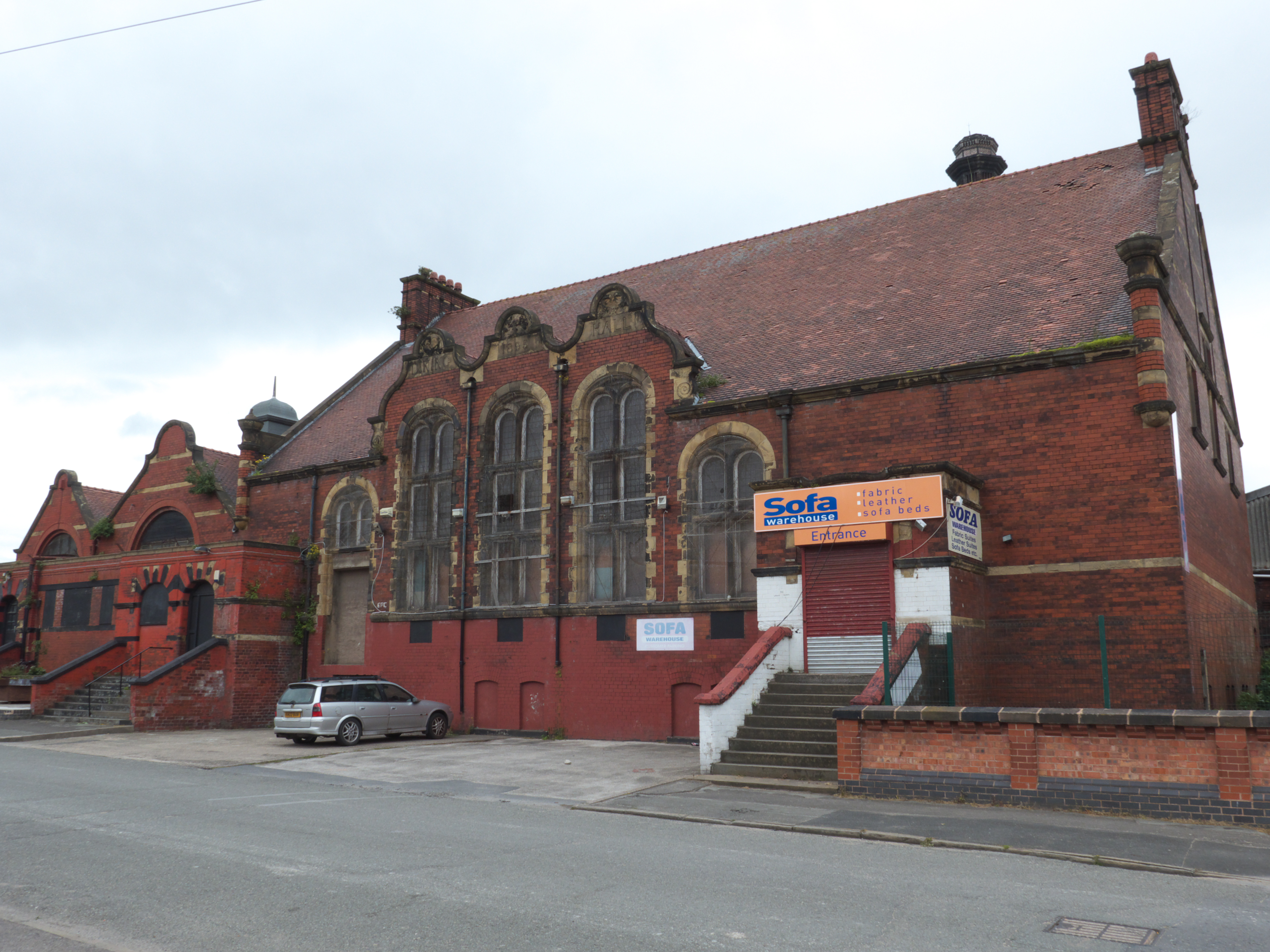
Former Dining Hall, Hartley's Jam Factory, Long Lane, Fazakerley
(1886; Grade II)

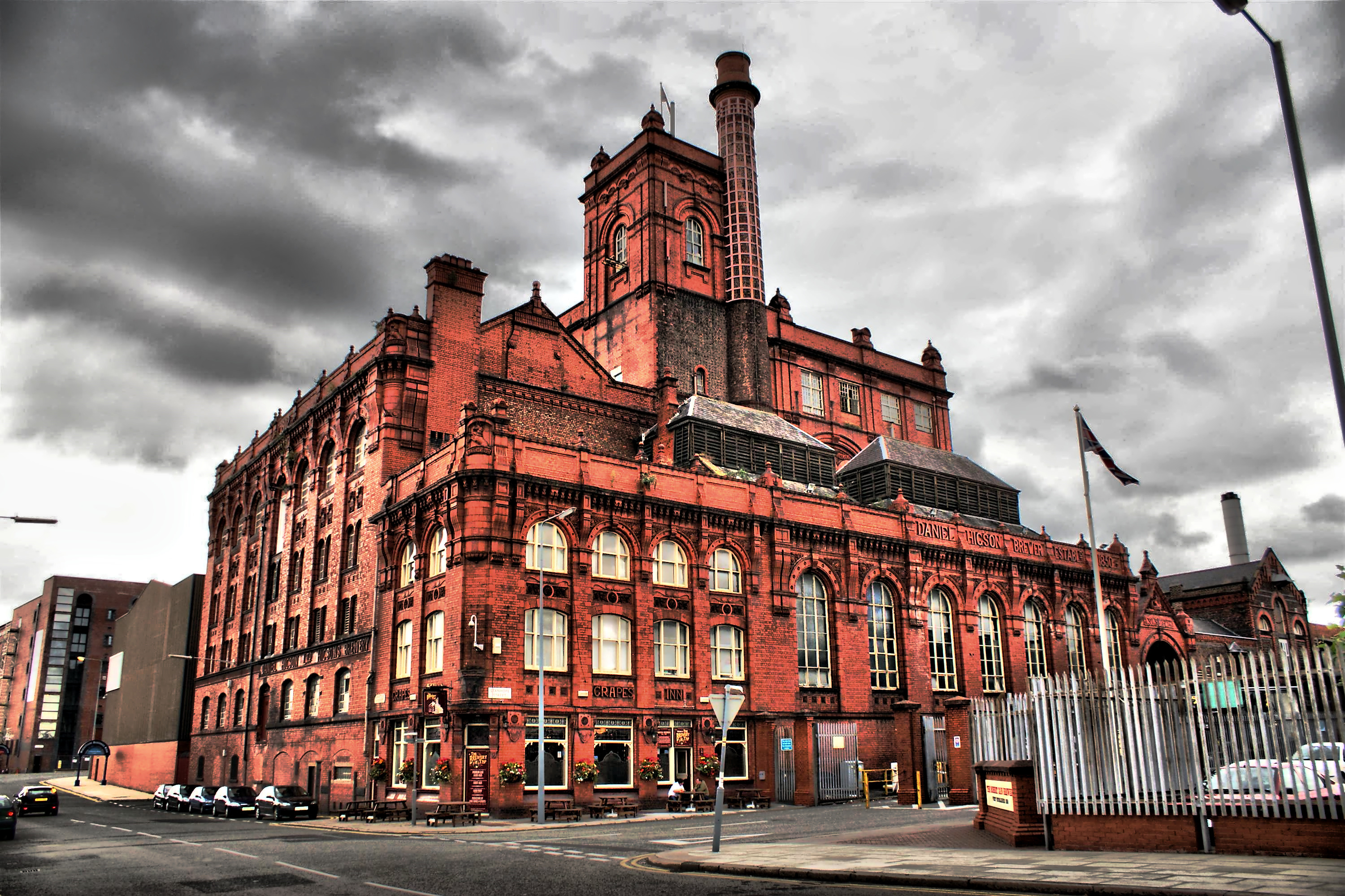
Former Cain's later Higson's Brewery, Stanhope Street
(1887 & 1902; Grade II)

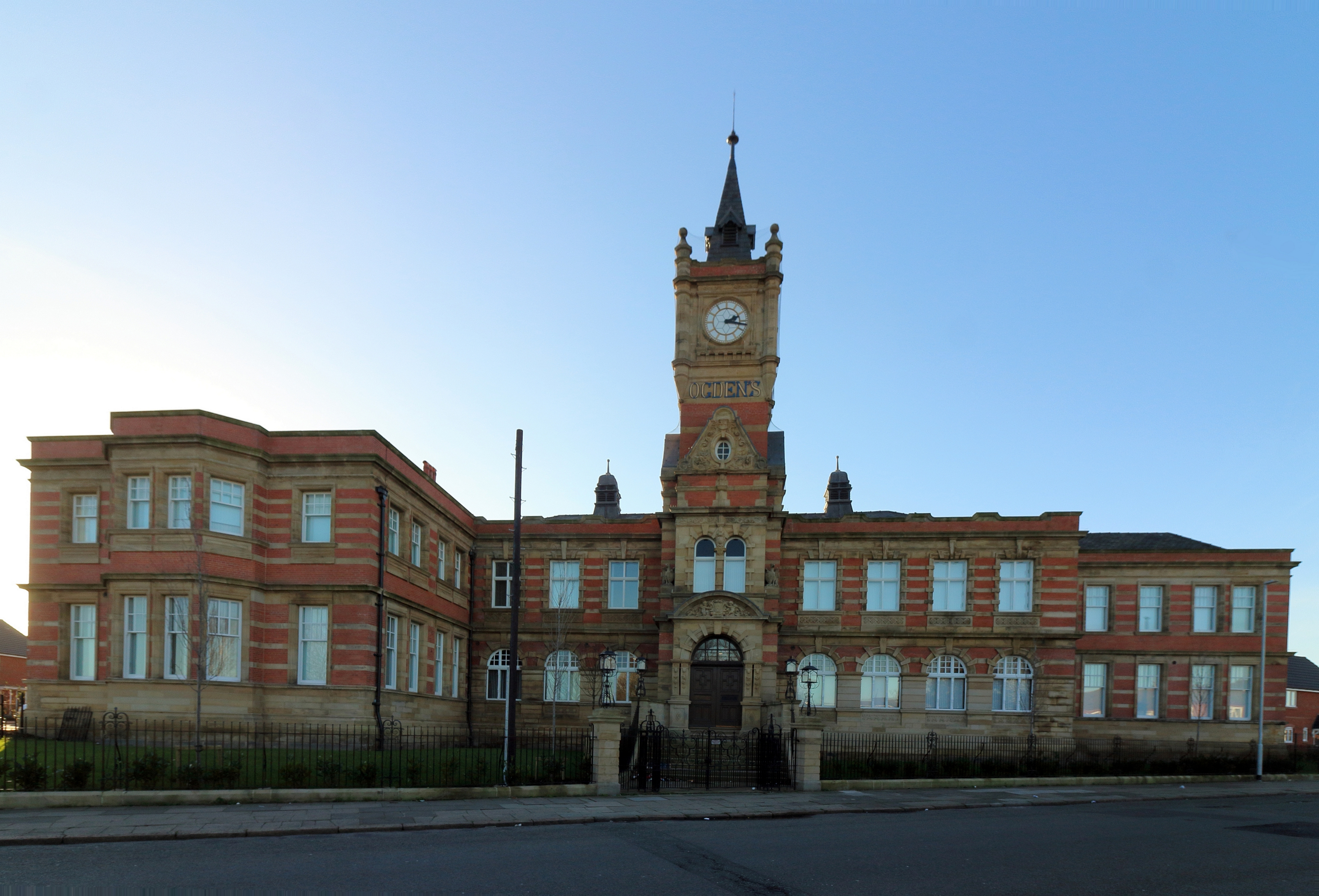
Office Block, former Ogden's Tobacco Factory, Boundary Lane, Everton
(1899; Grade II)

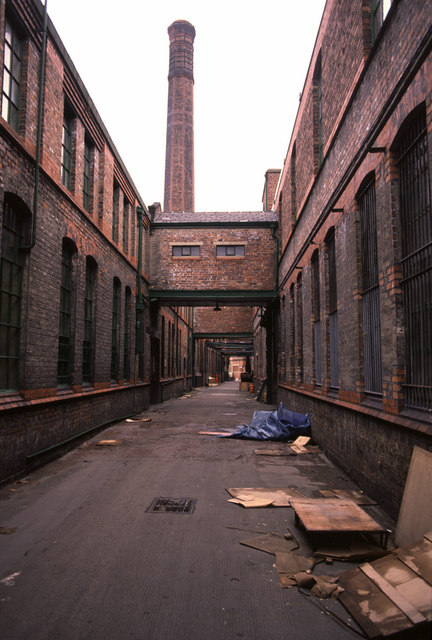
Ogden's Tobacco Factory
(1899; demolished)

=== Victorian domestic buildings ===
The suburbs of Liverpool that attracted the wealthy were Allerton, Aigburth, Mossley Hill, West Derby and Woolton. Several park estates with gates and lodges were developed, including Fulwood Park, Grassendale Park, Cressington Park, Sandown Park and Sandfield Park. The streets around the city's parks, especially Princes and Sefton, attracted the wealthy. Wavertree developed housing for the lower middle class. Areas such as Kirkdale, Vauxhall, Everton and the areas of Toxteth next to the docks were where working-class housing was built.

==== Victorian housing in Canning ====
The area around St James Cemetery known as Canning developed during the Georgian period and continued to expand in the late 1830s and 1840s, although the style of the buildings is a continuation of the Georgian style. The Victorian buildings in this area are Gambier Terrace, Mornington Terrace and Falkner Square – conceived in 1831 and built in the 1840s. William Culshaw of Culshaw and Sumners is known to have designed no. 29 Falkner Square and may have designed the whole square. Canning Street, first developed in the 1820s, saw more construction in the 1850s with numbers 45–55 being built, in a bold Italianate style, a departure from the Regency style used elsewhere in the area. Gambier Terrace was extended in the 1870s in a different style.

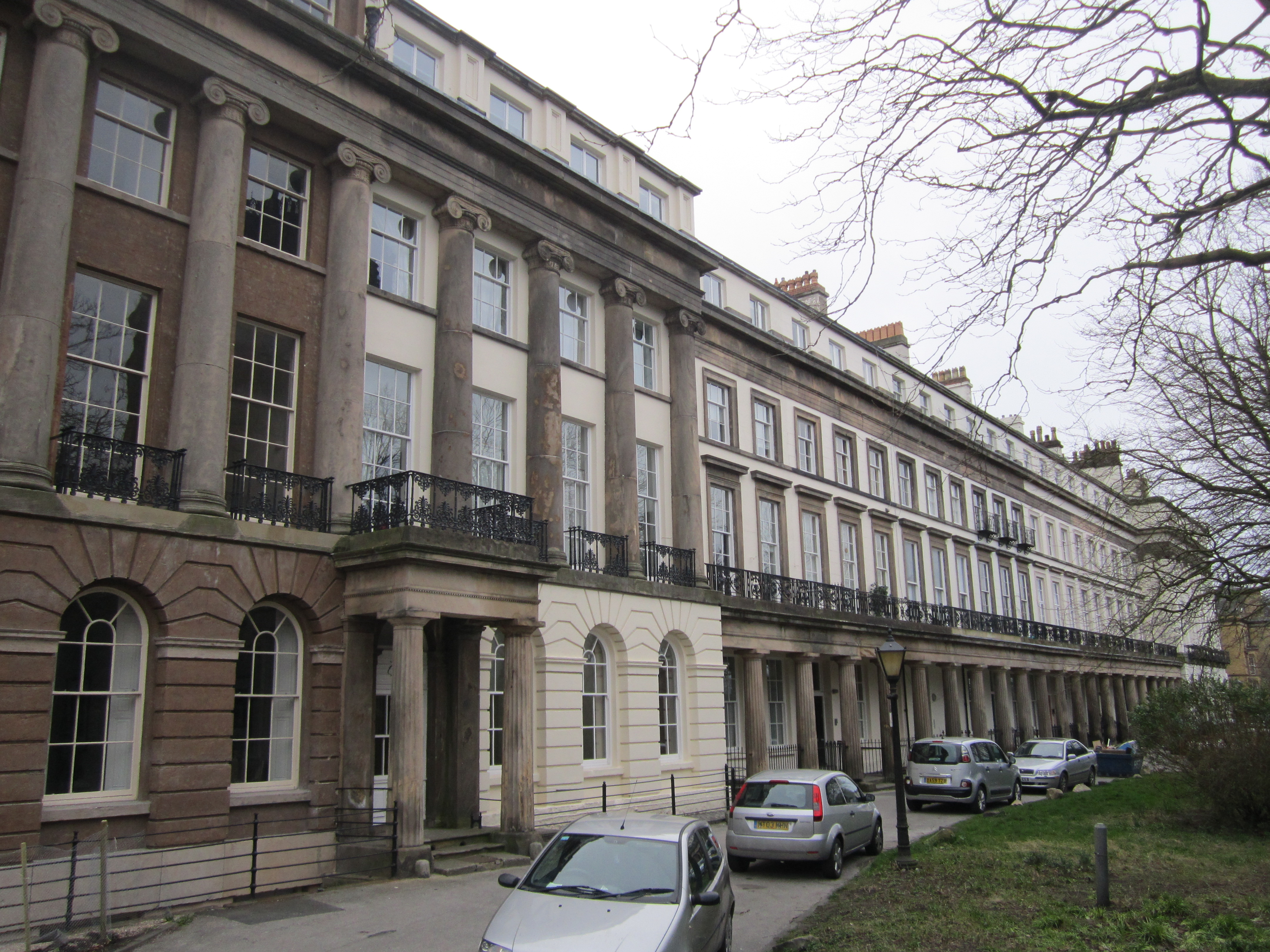
11-10 Gambier Terrace
(1837; Grade II*)

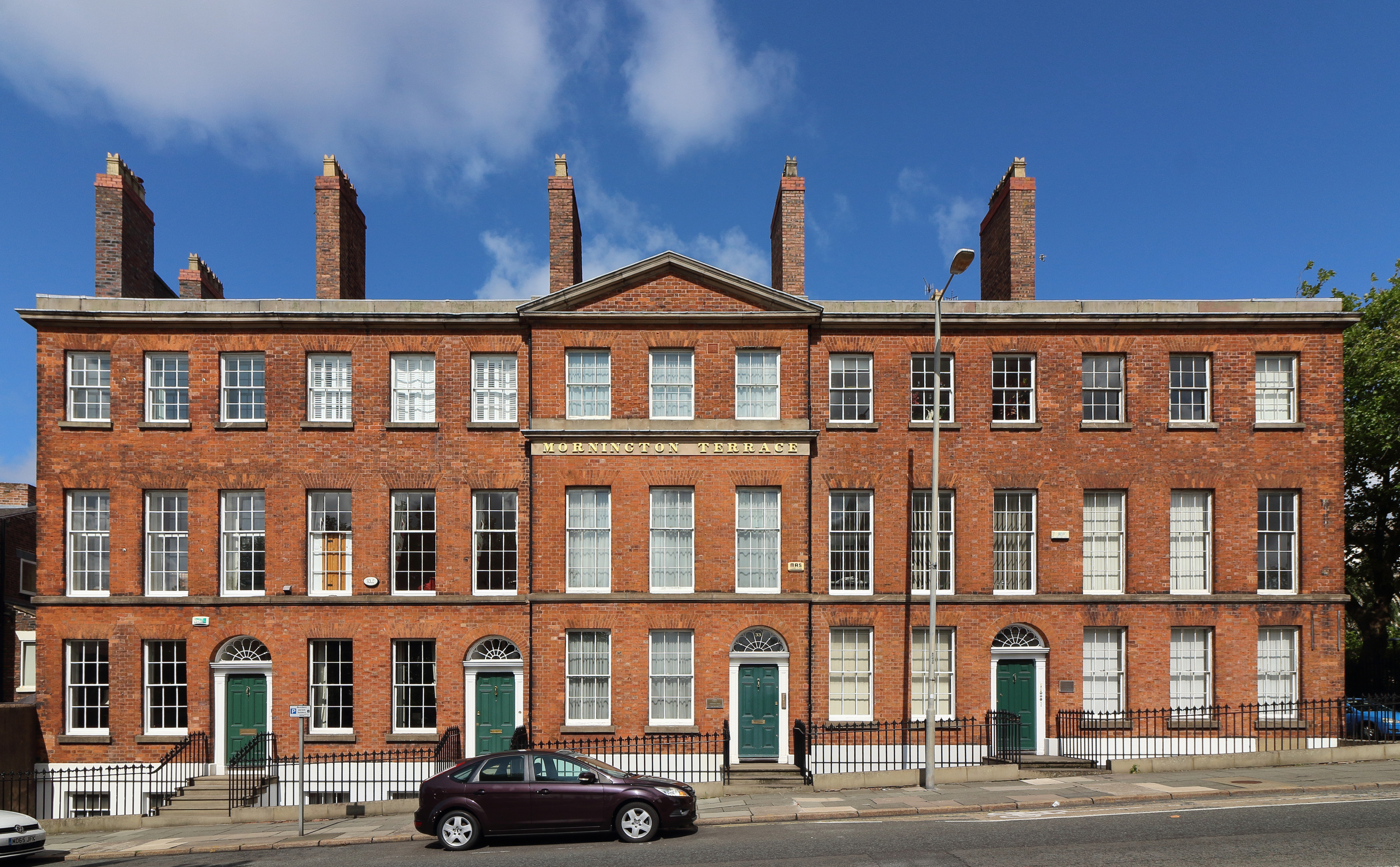
Mornington Terrace
(c.1839-40; Grade II)

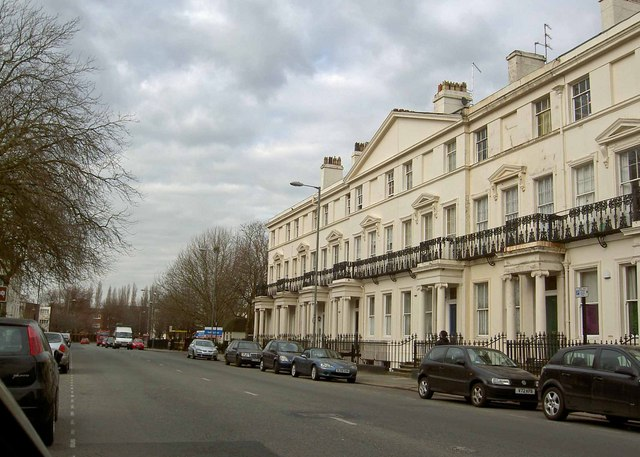
17-24 Falkner Square
(1840s; Grade II)

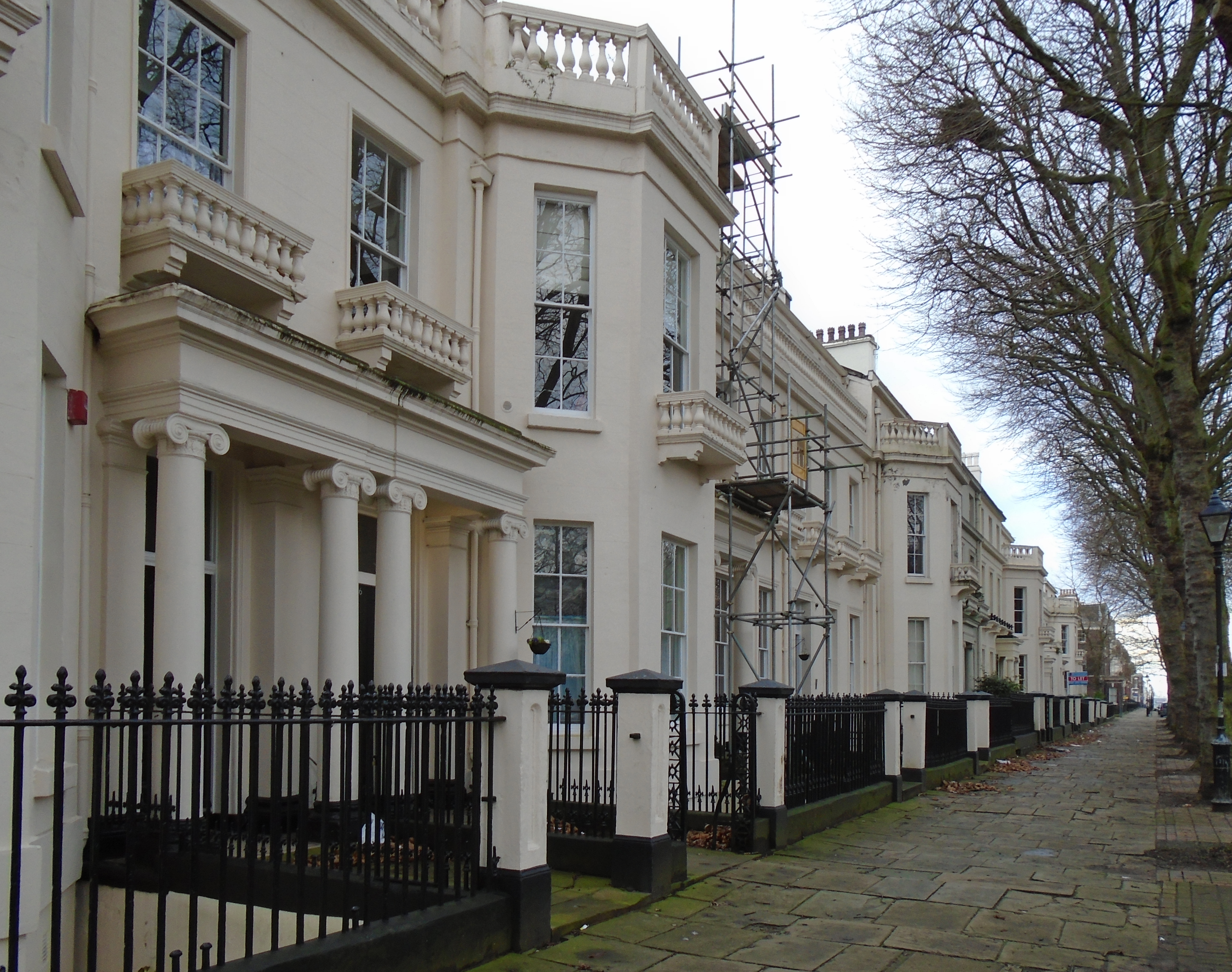
25-36 Falkner Square
(1840s; Grade II)

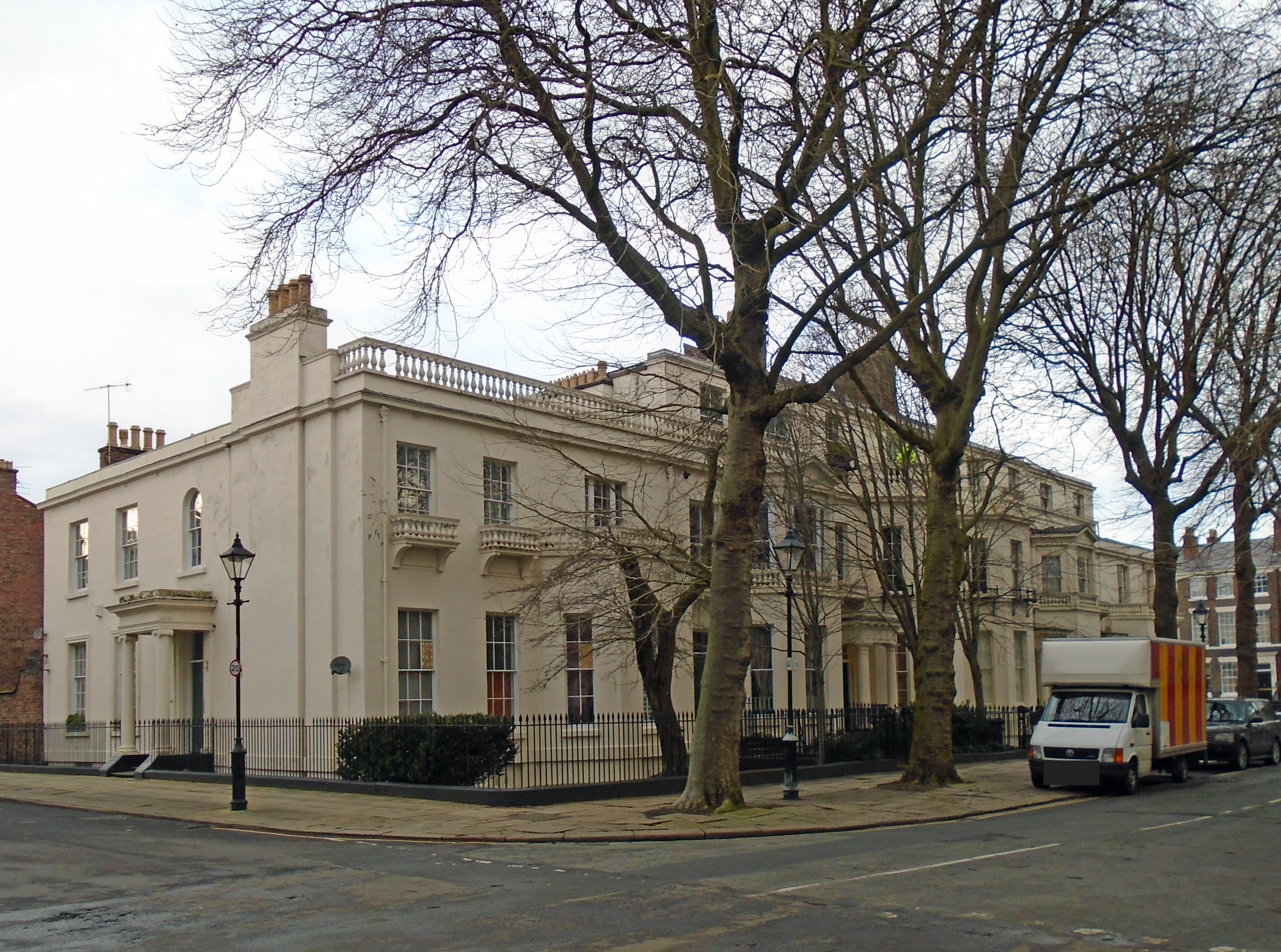
37-40 Falkner Square
(1840s; Grade II)

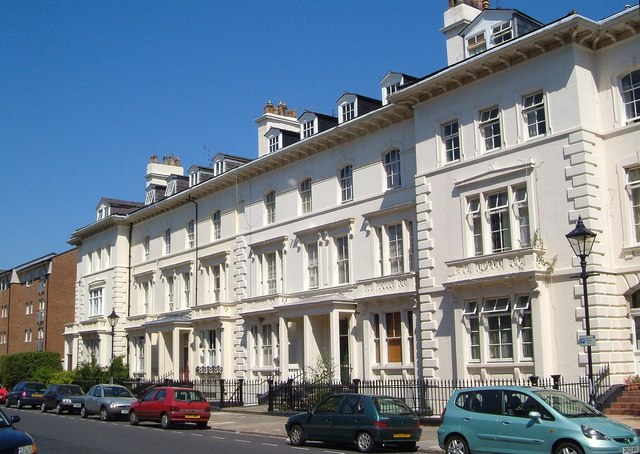
45-55 Canning Street
(1850s; Grade II)

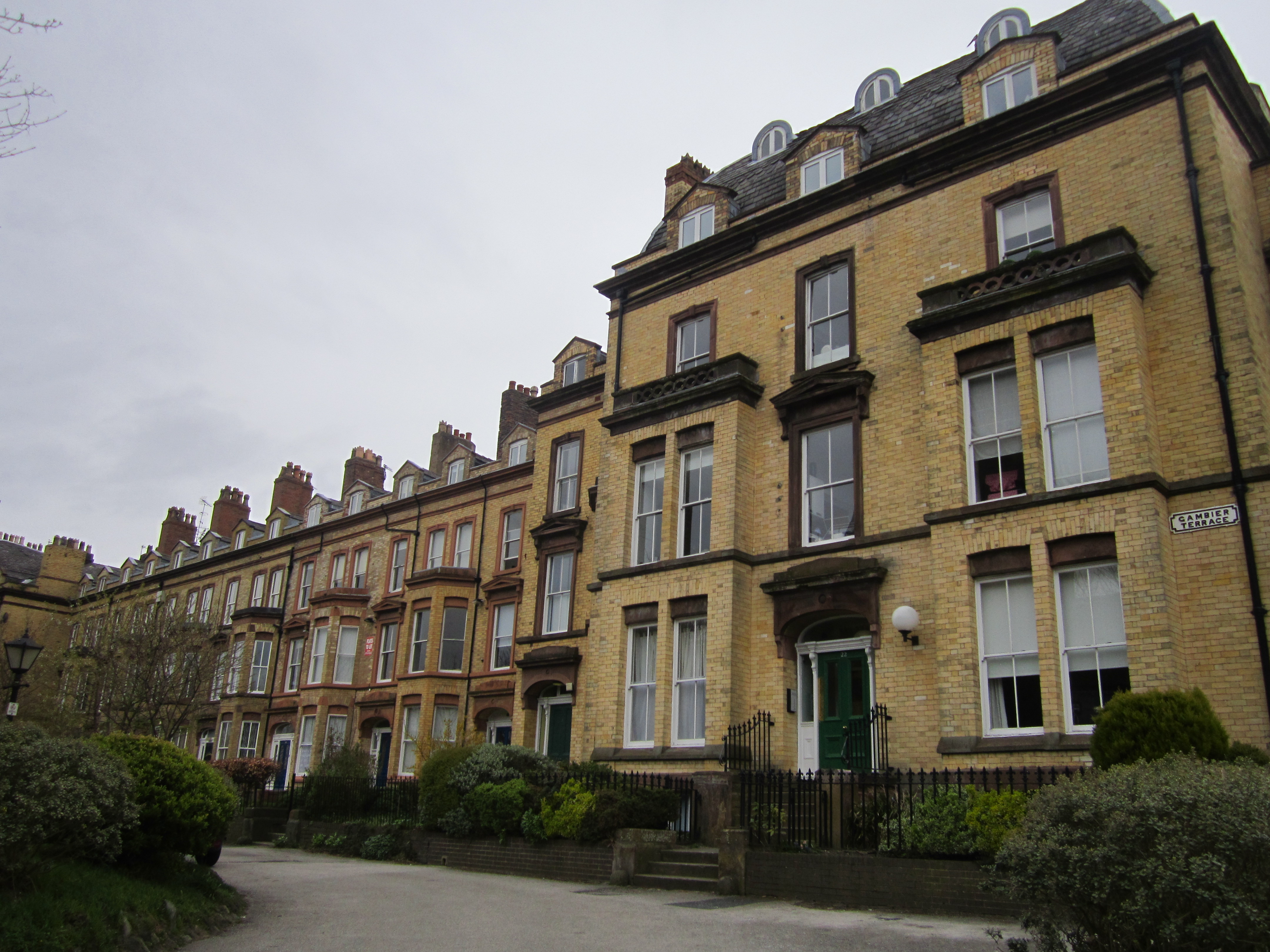
Gambier Terrace
(1870s; unlisted)

==== Victorian Classical, Italianate and Jacobethan houses and terraces ====
St Michael's Manor (also known as Springwood Manor) (1839) and its associated lodge on Woolton Road is a classical style mansion by John Cunningham. Thingwall Hall is an 18th-century building that was remodelled c.1846–47 by Harvey Lonsdale Elmes. Also by Elmes are the classical Lodge on Woolton Road, the Orangery to the now demolished Allerton Tower, and the Lodge to his demolished house of Druid's Cross, Allerton. An Italianate stuccoed house of the 1840s is Hartfield. Lowlands in West Derby is an Italianate house built by Thomas Haigh, architect, for himself. The Gateacre Grange, Rose Brow, Gateacre, is a large gabled Jacobethan house built in 1866 by Cornelius Sherlock for the brewer Sir Andrew Barclay Walker, extended in 1883 to the designs of Sir Ernest George and Harold Peto, and converted to apartments in 2005. The Jacobethan style Camp Hill Lodge (1868) served as an entrance to Camp Hill, once part of the Woolton Hall estate; it was remodelled in 1885, leaving the early elements of the earlier structure to create a Jacobethan look, probably by the architect James Rhind who extended the main house at this time.

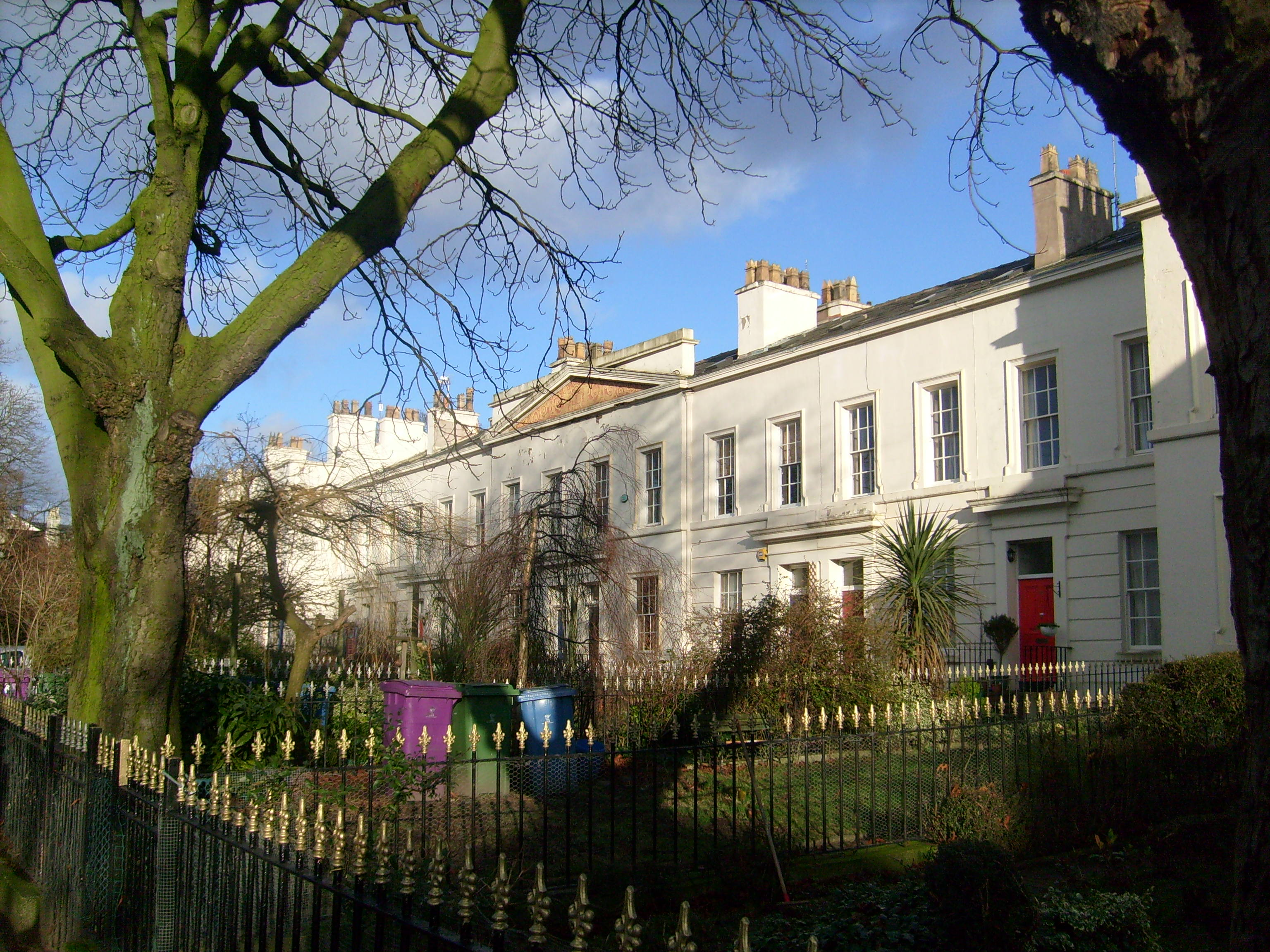
Sandown Terrace, Sandown Lane, Wavertree
(1836–46; Grade II)

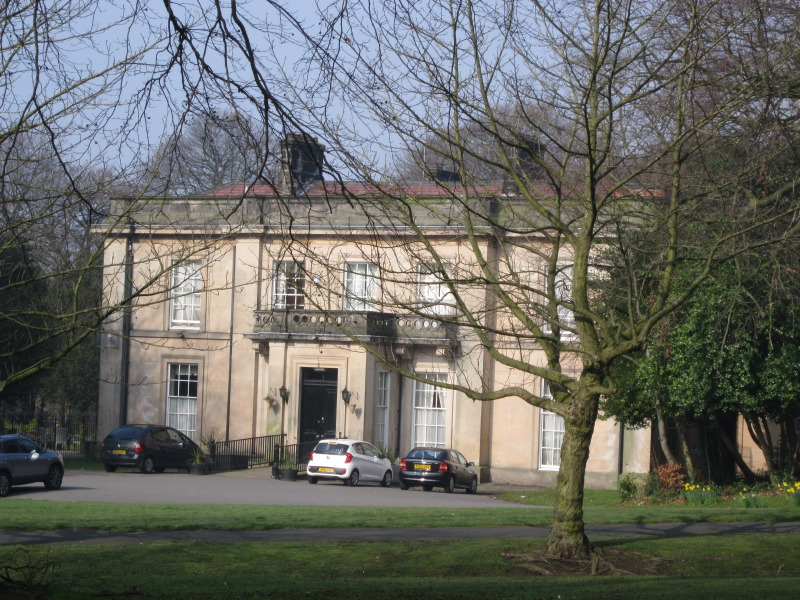
St Michael's Manor (Also called Springwood Manor), Woolton Road, Allerton
(1839; Grade II)

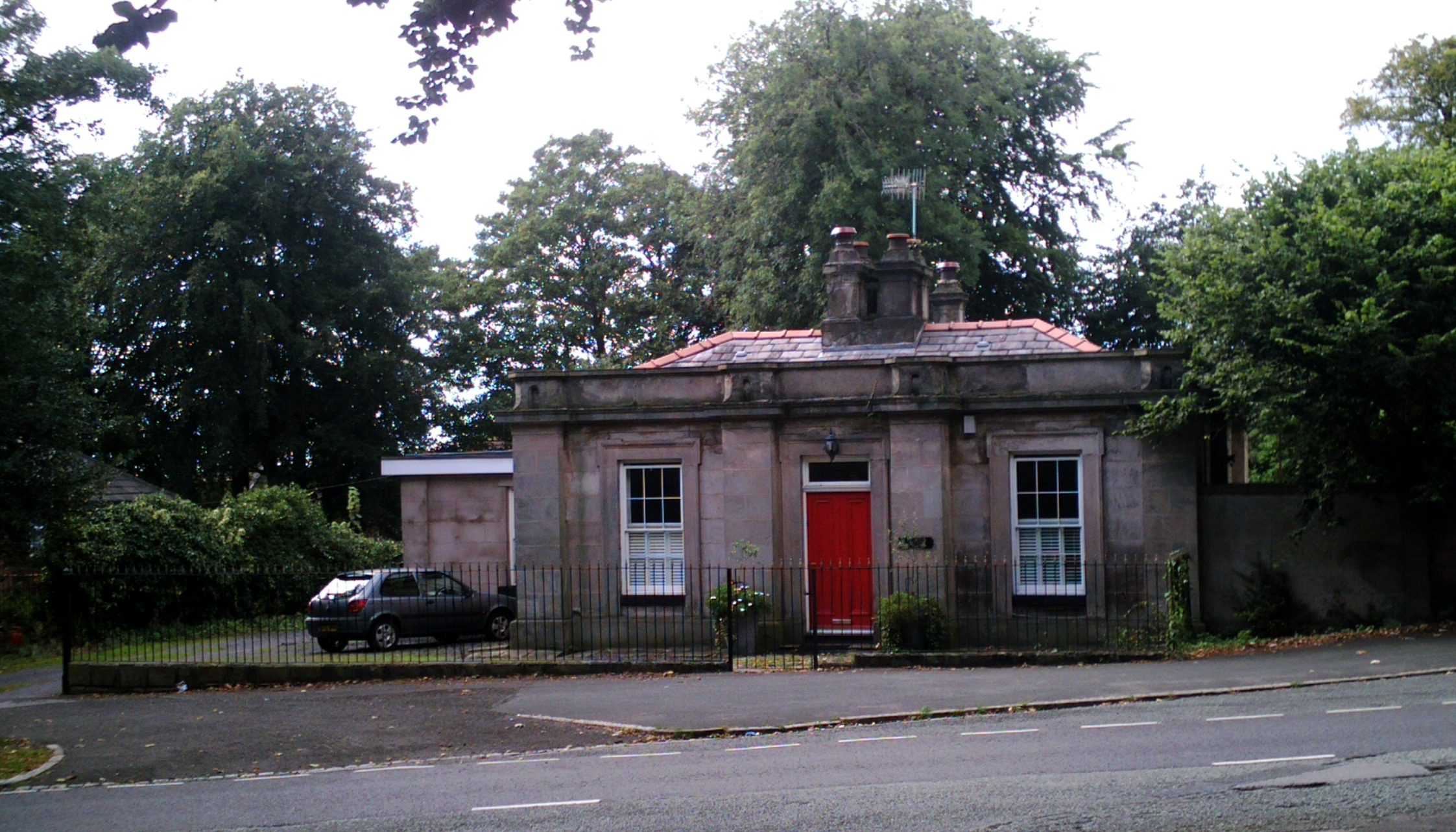
Springwood Lodge, Woolton Road, Allerton
(1839; Grade II)

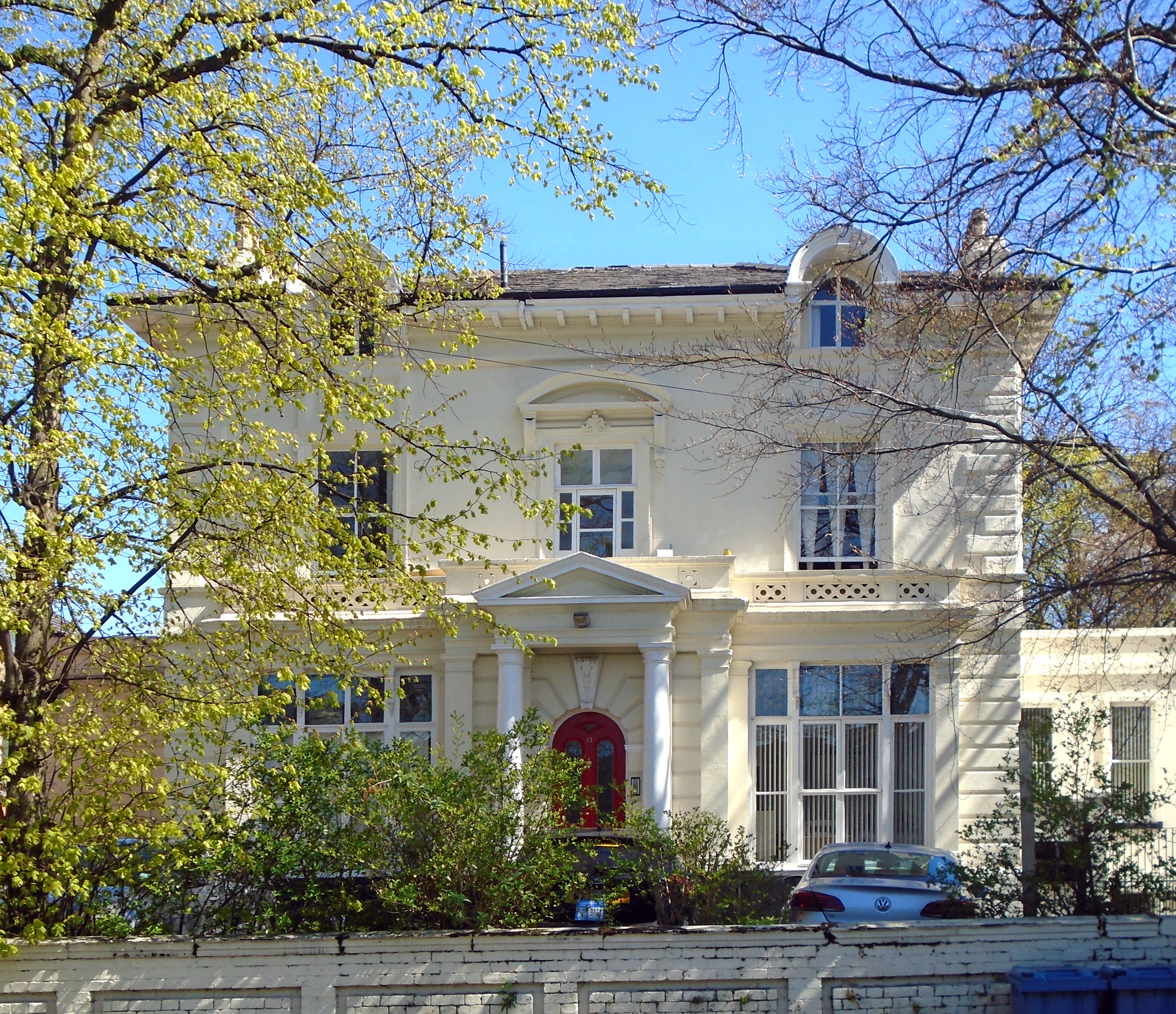
17 Lockerby Road, Fairfield
(1840s; grade II)

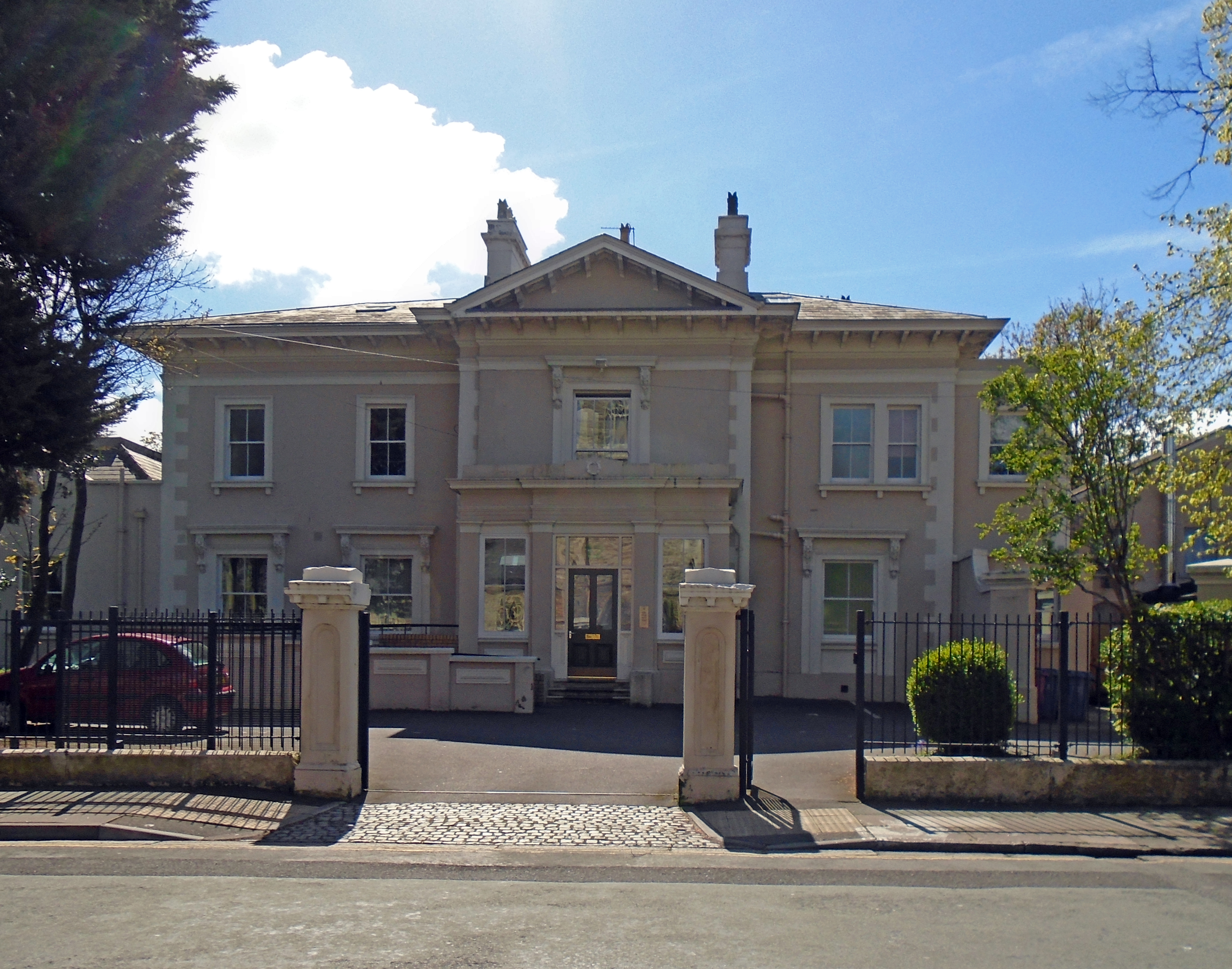
12 Holly Road, Fairfield
(1840s; grade II)

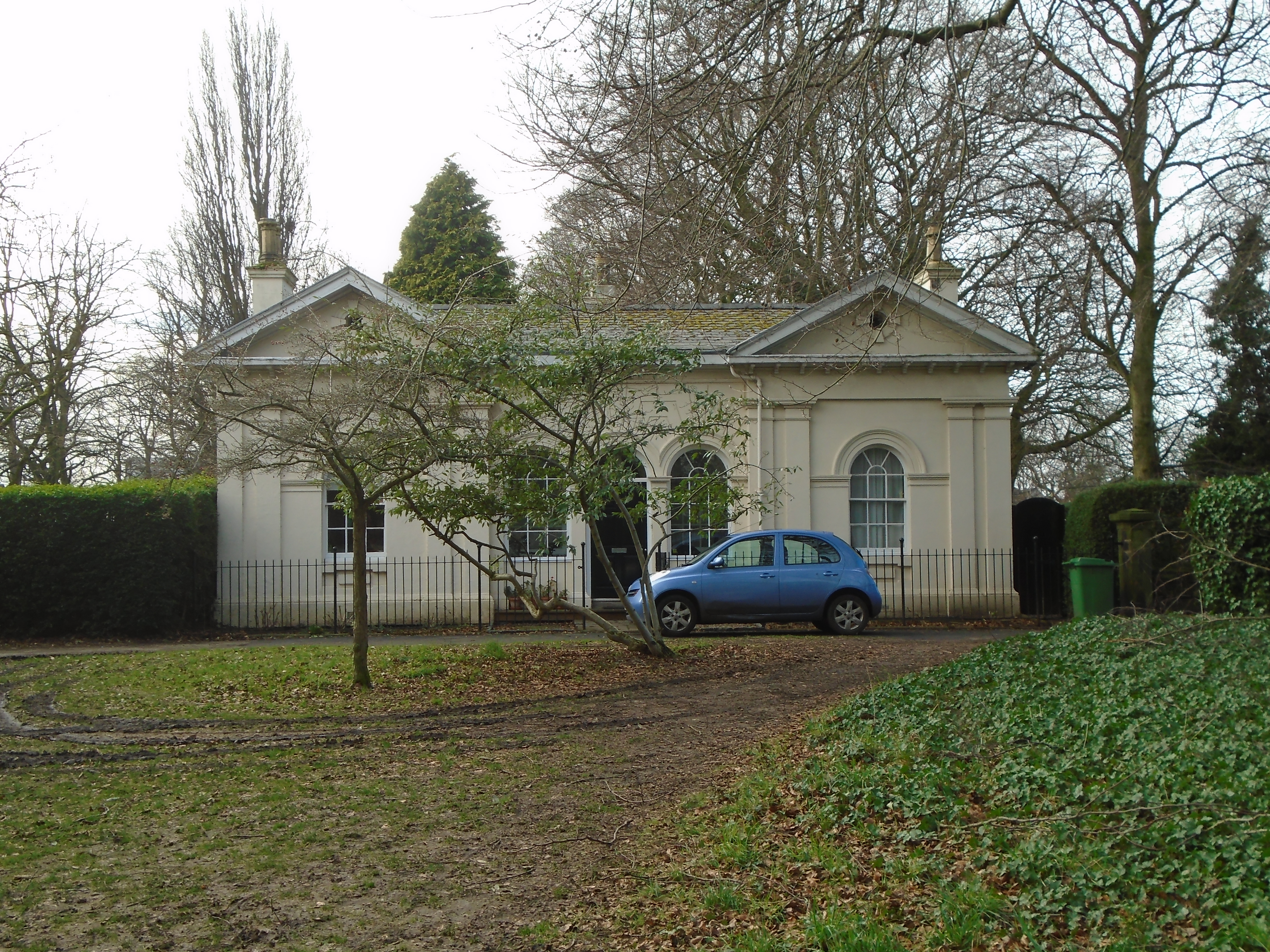
Northern Harthill Lodge, Calderstones Road, Allerton
(1840s; grade II)

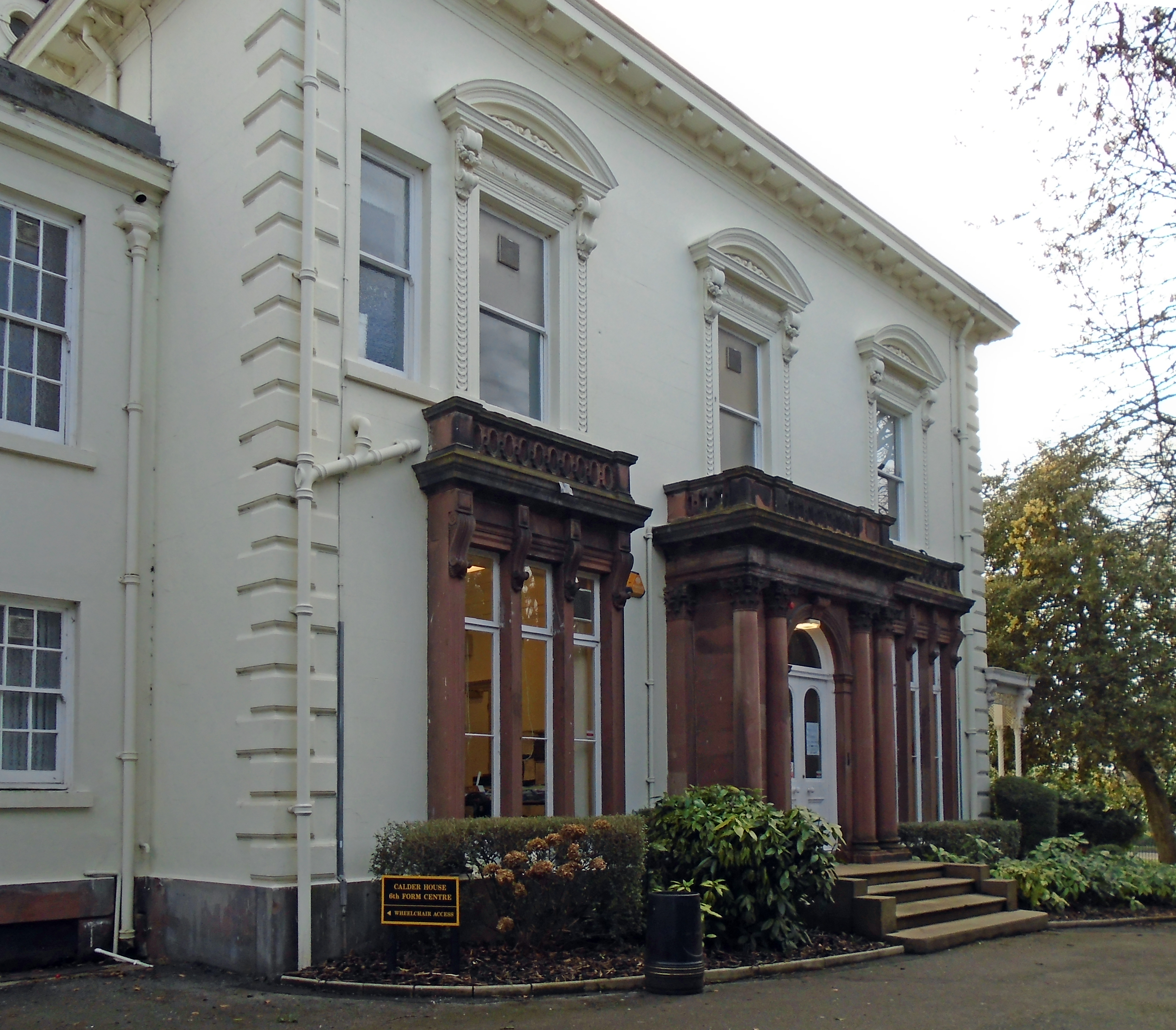
Hartfield House, now part of Calderstones School, Harthill Road, Allerton
(late 1840s; Grade II)

==== Victorian Gothic houses ====
There are several impressive Gothic houses around the city; the Church of England vicarages and Roman Catholic equivalent presbyteries were often Gothic to match their churches. The style was also used to design mansions for the wealthy.

The vicarage for St Margaret's Church (c.1869), Princes Road, is by George Edmund Street. The vicarage of St Matthew & St James (1873), Rose Lane, Mossley Hill, is almost certainly by the architects of the church Paley and Austin; the vicarage of St Agnes & St Pancras (1887) is by Richard Norman Shaw. The vicarage of St John the Baptist (1890), Tuebrook, which has some Jacobethan features, was designed by the architect of the church, George Frederick Bodley.

St. Joseph's Home, Childwall, originally a residential home for Roman Catholics and now a single-family residence, is by Augustus Pugin (1845–47); it was altered in 1866 by his son E. W. Pugin who remodelled the garden front. Also by E.W. Pugin is the presbytery (1856–57) of St Vincent de Paul, and he designed the Presbytery of St Oswald's, Old Swan. The presbytery (1893) of St Anne's Church, Edge Hill is by Pugin & Pugin. The presbytery of St Clare's Arundel Avenue (1890) was designed by Leonard Stokes. The Lodge to Crosteth Park in West Derby is probably designed by William Eden Nesfield.

Harthill Lodge, with its decorative bargeboards, was an entrance to the demolished Hart Hill; now it leads to Calderstones Park. The Dell (1850), Beechwood Road South, Aigburth, is a stucco Tudor Gothic villa. For the three surviving Gothic-style houses by Alfred Waterhouse, see the section above. Broughton Hall (1858–59), by Walter Scott, designed for merchant Gustavus C. Schaube of Hamburg, has notable interiors. Holmestead, Mossley Hill was originally built c. 1845 by A.H. Holme but extensively remodelled and extended in 1869–70, probably by Culshaw & Sumners who added the tower; there is a fine Lodge to the house of c. 1845. Cleveley Cottage (1865), on Allerton Road, was designed by Sir George Gilbert Scott for cotton merchant Joseph Leather. Quarrybank House and its Lodge (1866–67), designed by Culshaw and Sumners, was built for James Bland, a timber merchant, and is now a school. Greenbank Lodge (c. 1870), on Greenbank Drive, was designed by André and Hornblower. Streatlam Tower (1871), 5 Princes Road, was designed by W & G Audsley for wool merchant James Lord Bowes, to house his collection of Japanese art. An oddity is The Octagon (1867), Grove Street, built by Dr J.W. Hayward; vaguely Gothic, it was built to demonstrate the designer's theories on heating and ventilation.

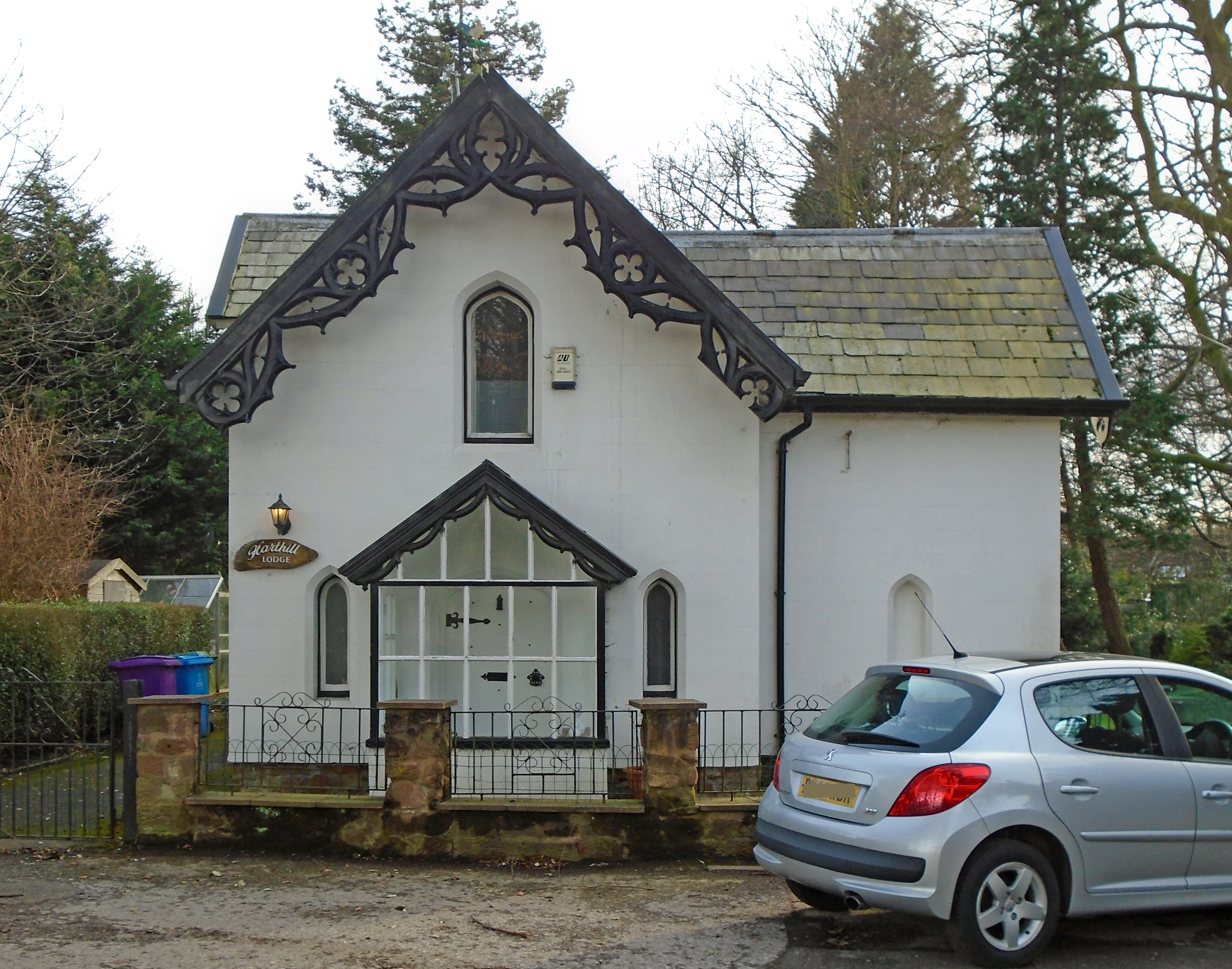
Southern Harthill Lodge, Harthill Road, Allerton
(1840s; grade II)

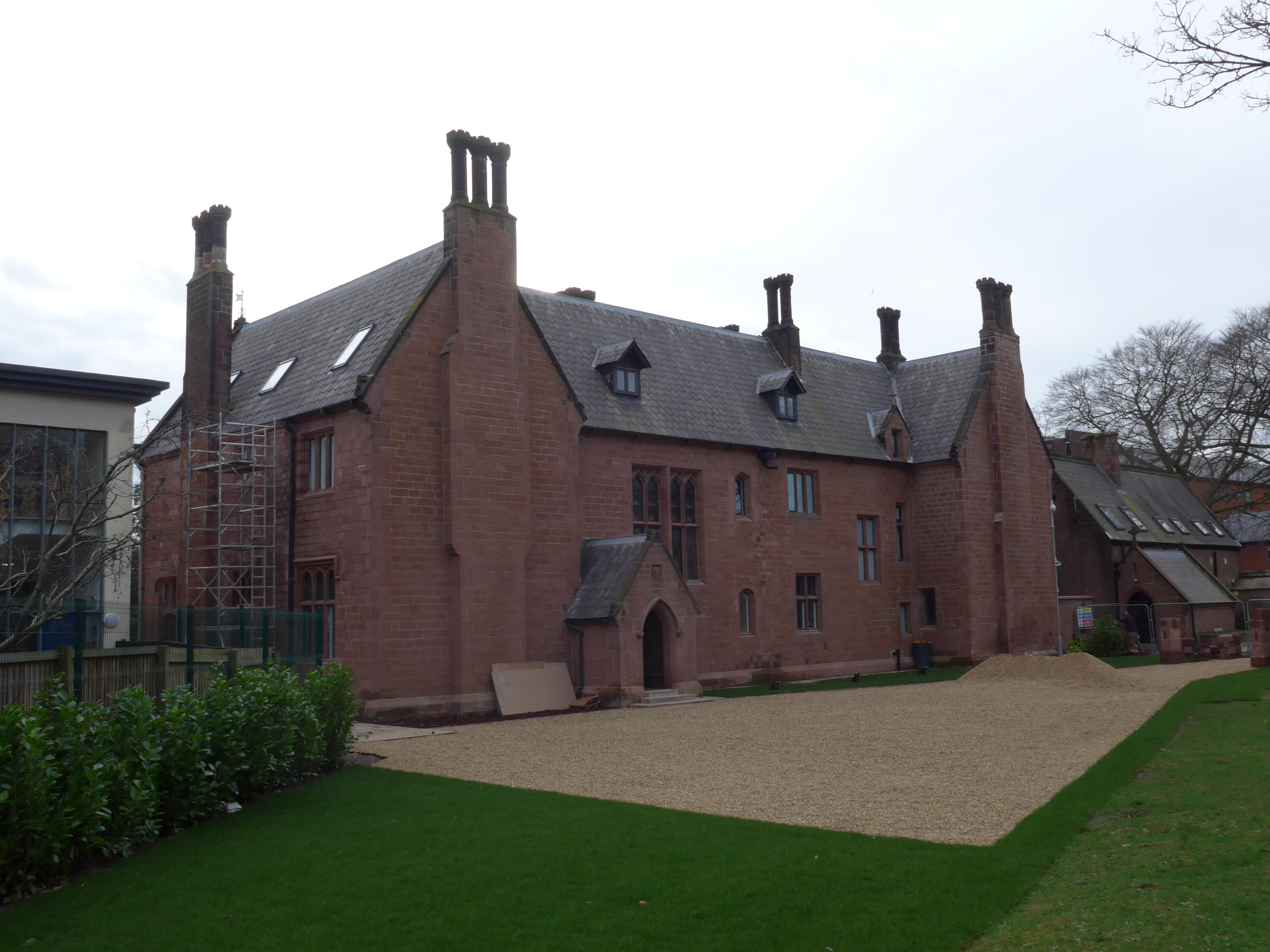
Saint Joseph's Home, Woolton Road, Childwall, by Augustus Welby Northmore Pugin, altered by Edward Welby Pugin
(1845–47 & 1866; Grade II*)

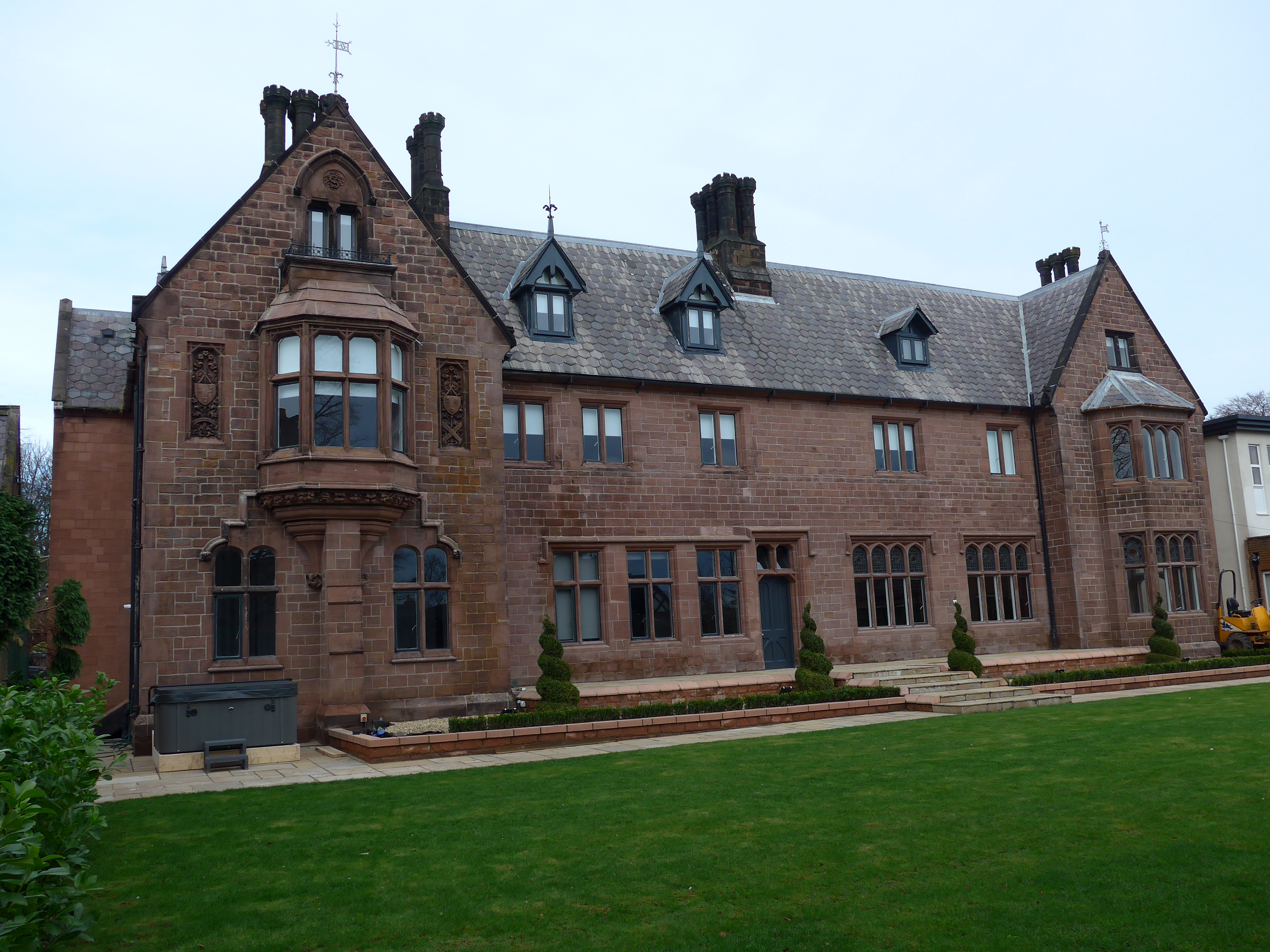
Saint Joseph's Home, Woolton Road, Childwall, Garden front showing 1866 alterations by Augustus by Edward Welby Pugin
(1845–47 & 1866; Grade II*)

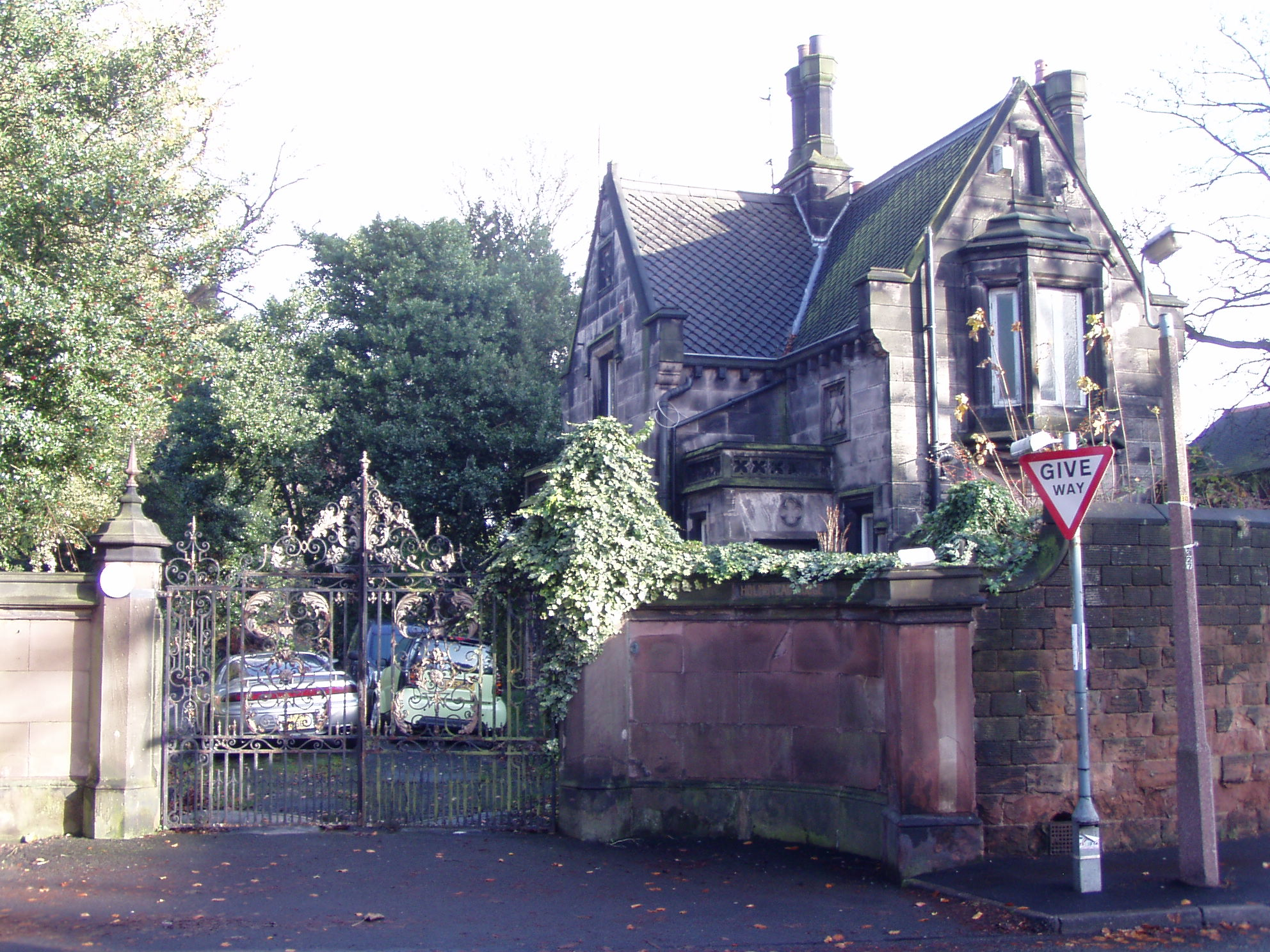
Lodge to Holmstead, Rose Lane, Mossley Hill
(c.1845; Grade II)

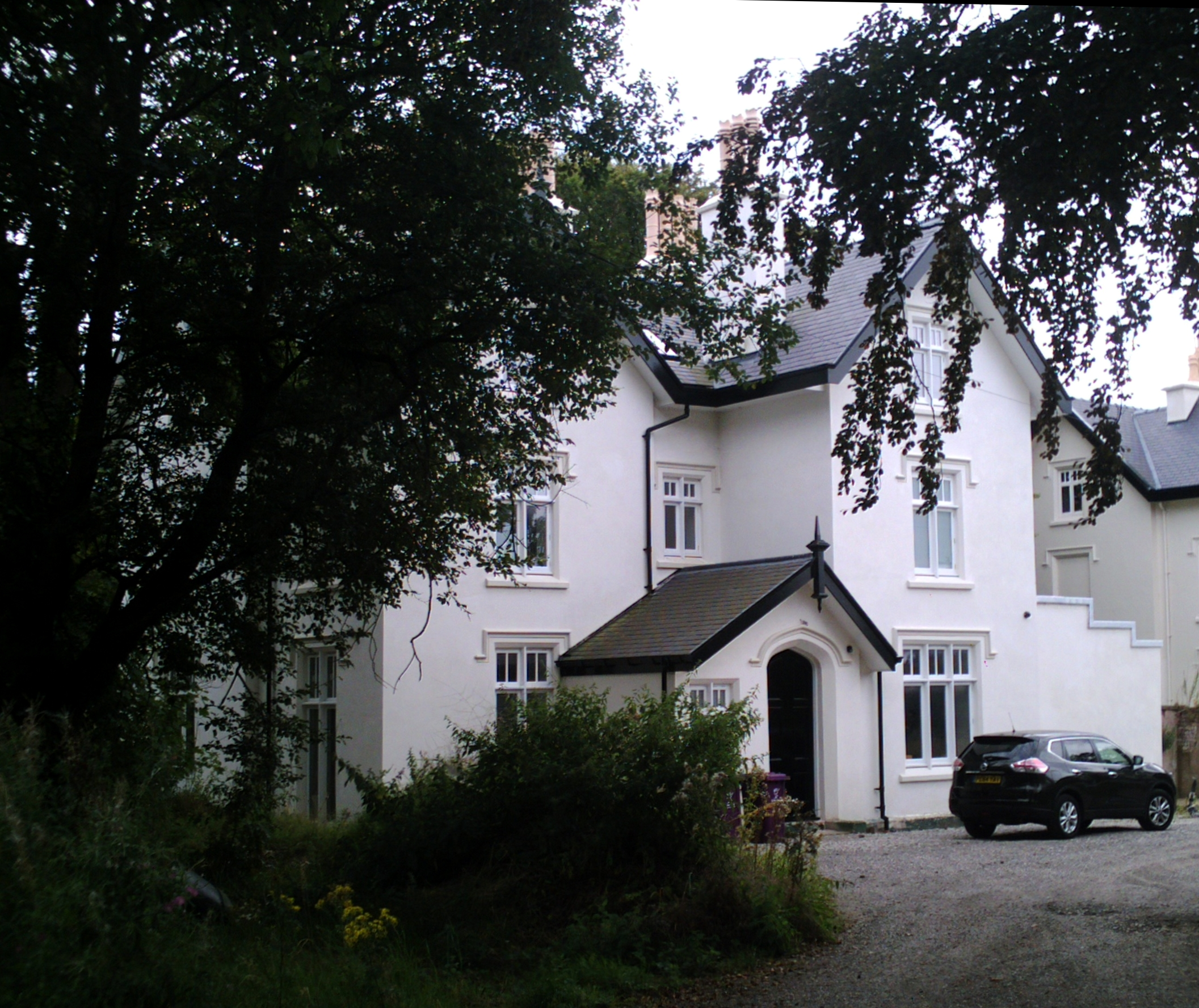
The Dell, Beechwood Road South, Aigburth
(c.1850; grade II)

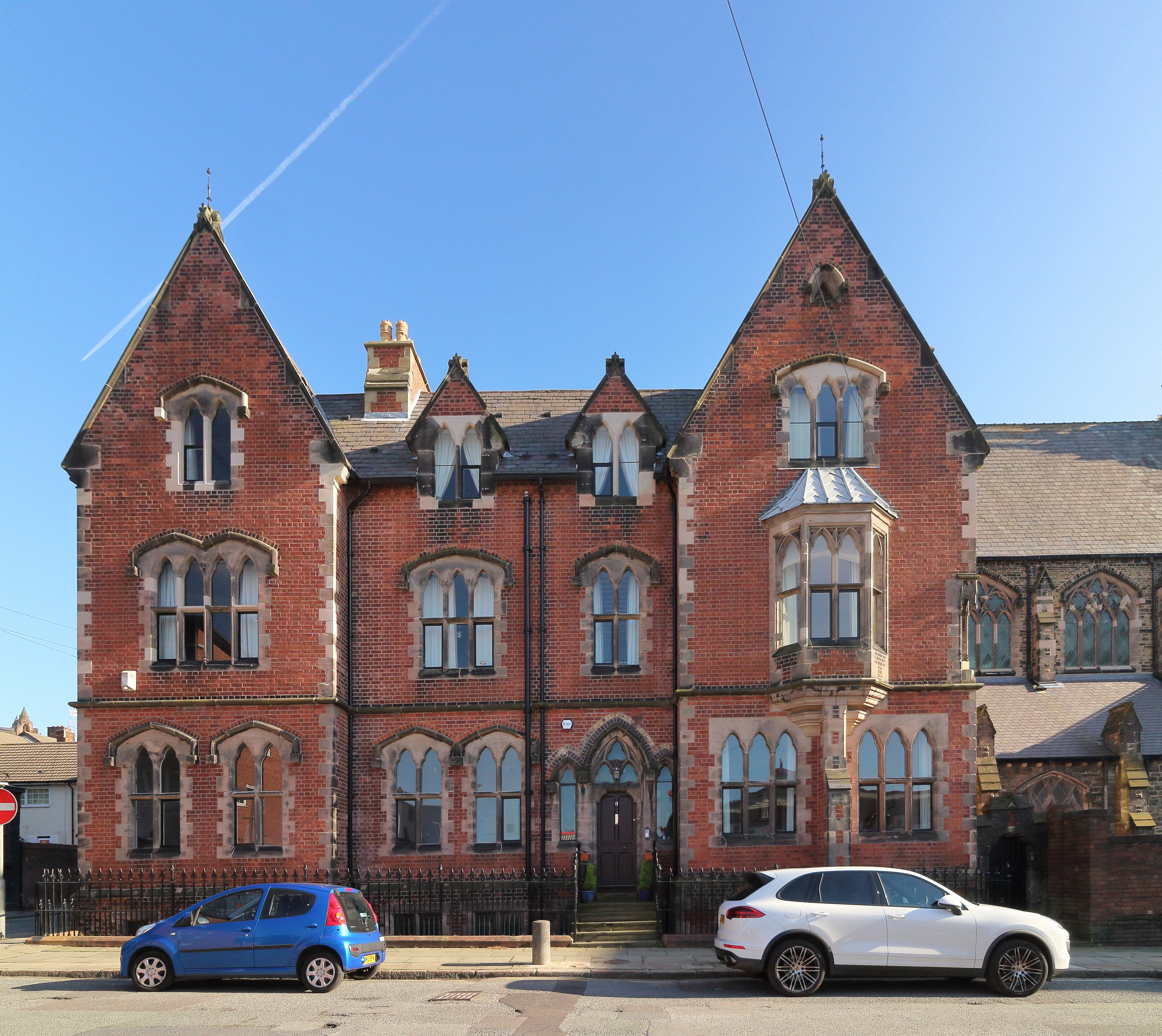
Presbytery of St Vincent de Paul, Hardy Street
(1856–57; Grade II)

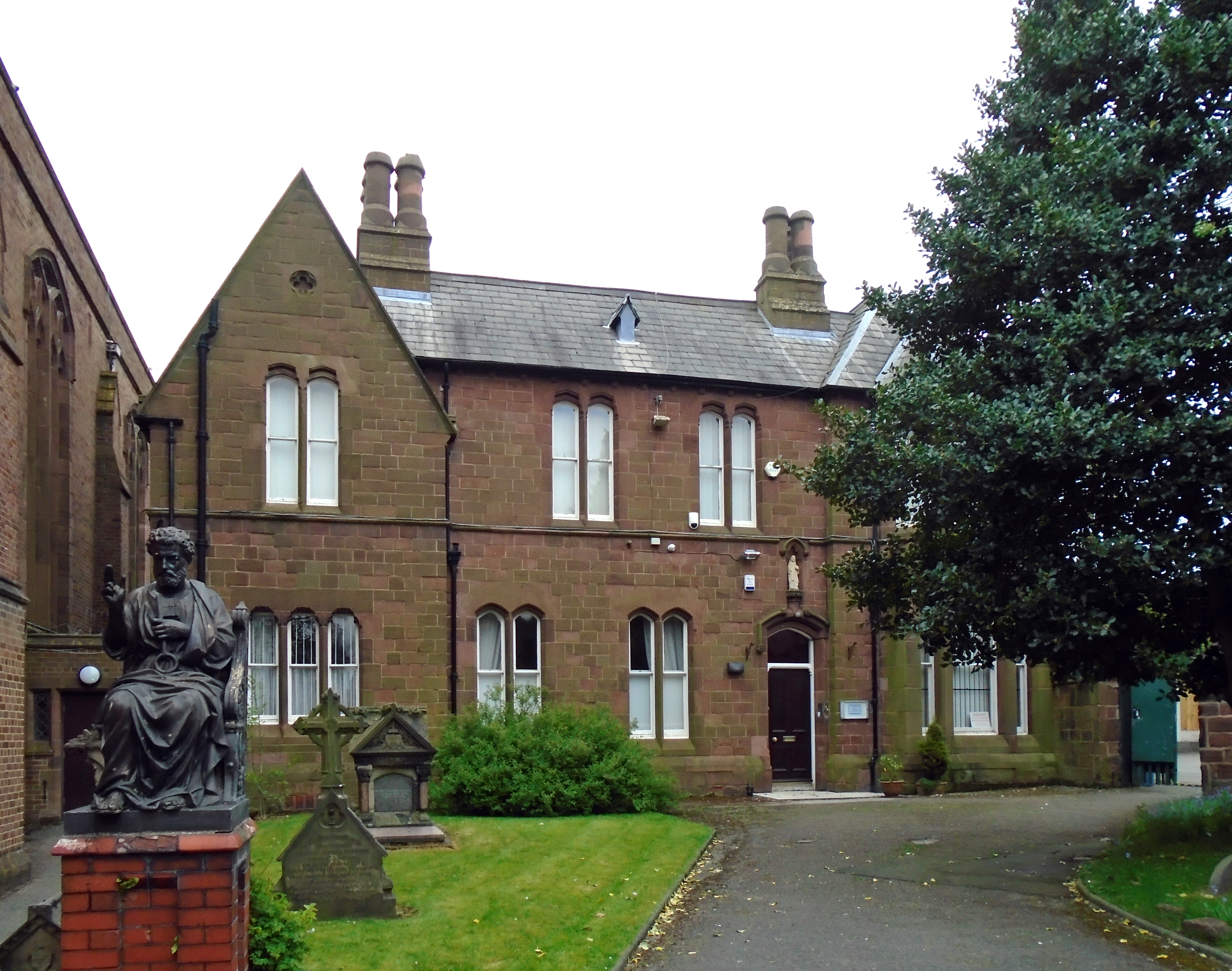
Presbytery of St Oswald's, Old Swan
(1857; Grade II)

==== Victorian workers' housing ====
Workers' housing includes Stanley Terrace and Gordon Place, in Mossley Hill just off Bridge Road, early surviving terraces of workingmen's houses from the 1840s. Orford Street in Wavertree is lined by workers' terraced housing. In Gateacre are Church Cottages (1872), 5–8 Belle Vale Road, built in a Tudor revival style. William Pickles Hartley created the Hartley's Village for workers at his factory in nearby Long Lane, started in 1888 and designed by William Sugden & Son.

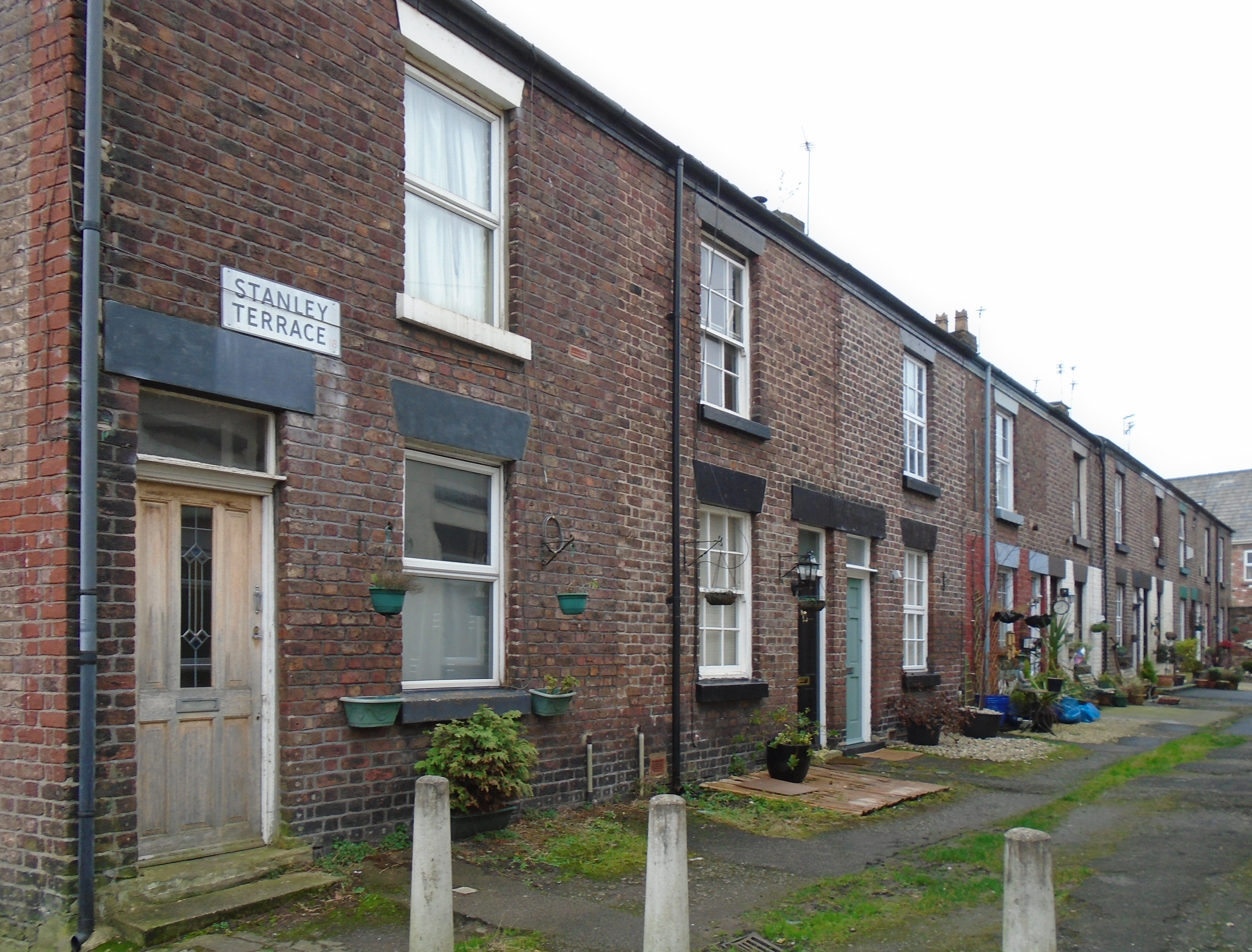
Stanley Terrace, Mossley Hill
(1840s; Grade II)

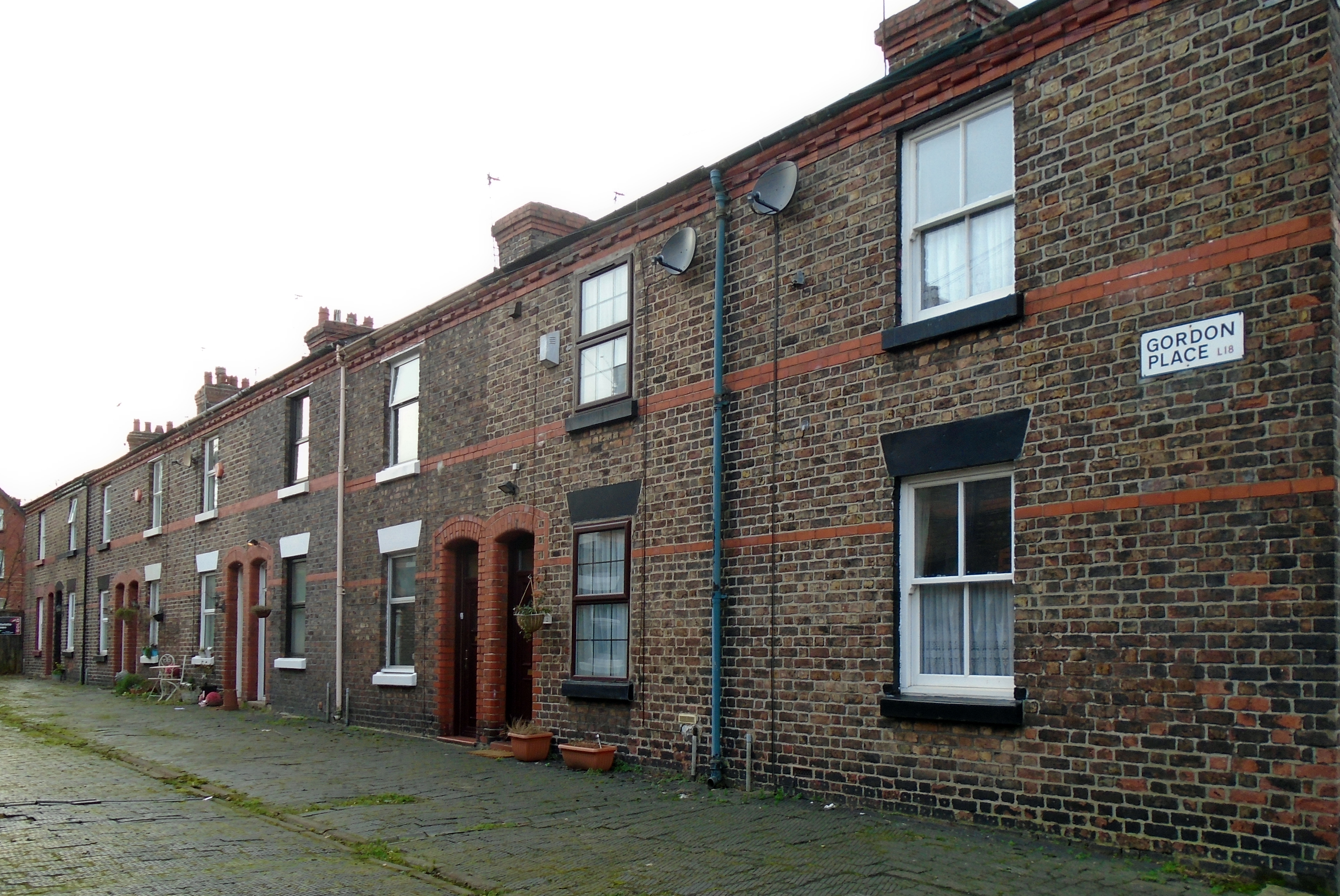
2-16 Gordon Place, Mossley Hill
(1840s; Grade II)

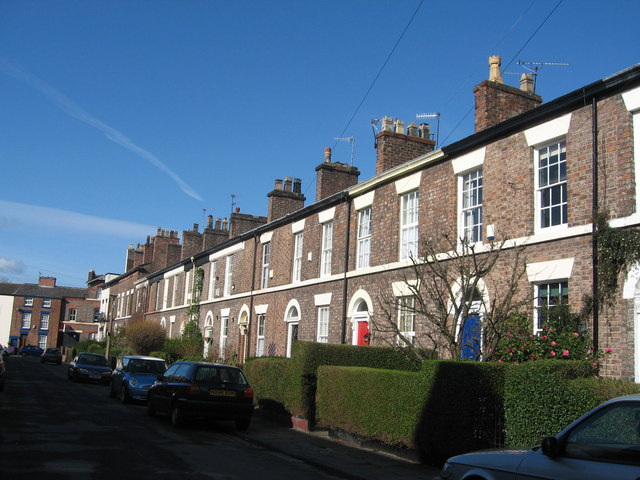
Orford Street, Wavertree
(c.1850; Grade II)

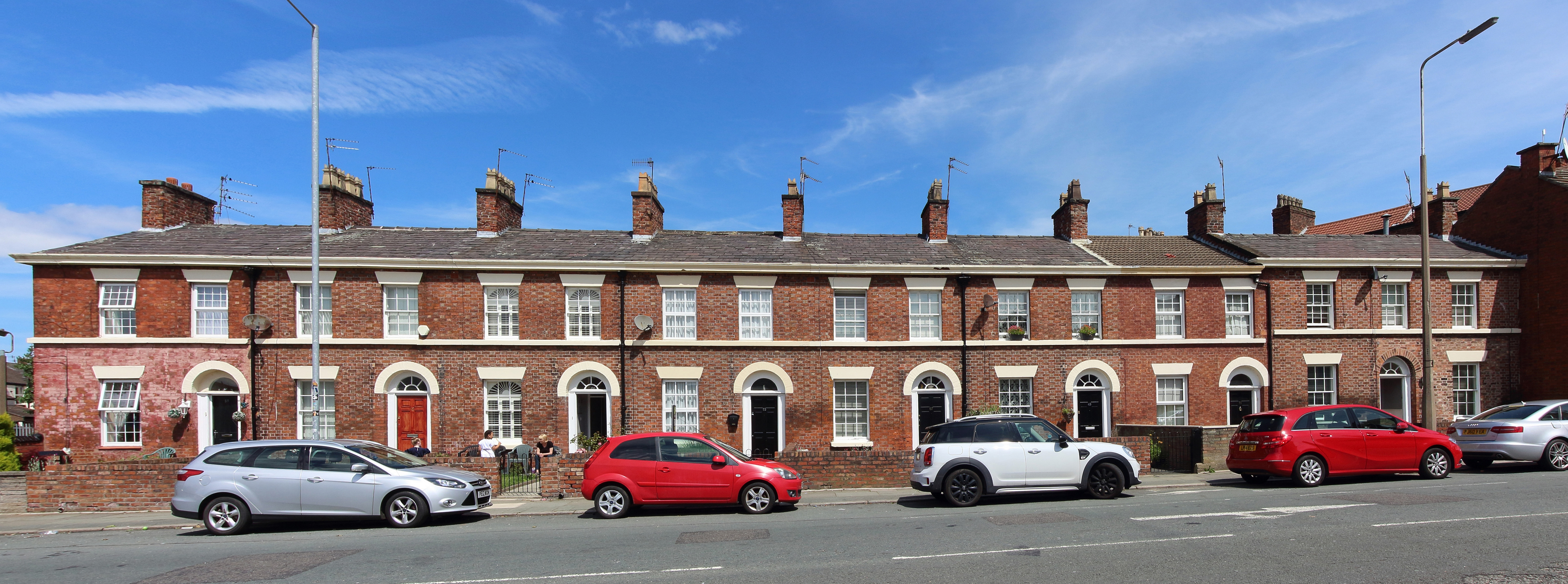
59 - 73 Barlow Lane, Kirkdale
(c.1850; Grade II)

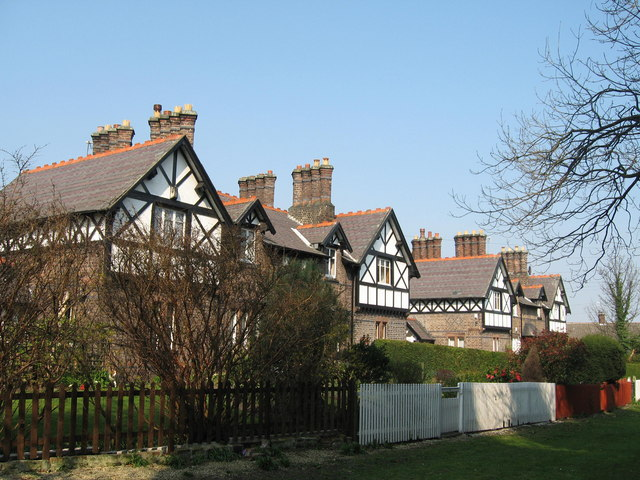
Church Cottages, 5-8 Belle Vale Road, Gateacre
(1872; Grade II)

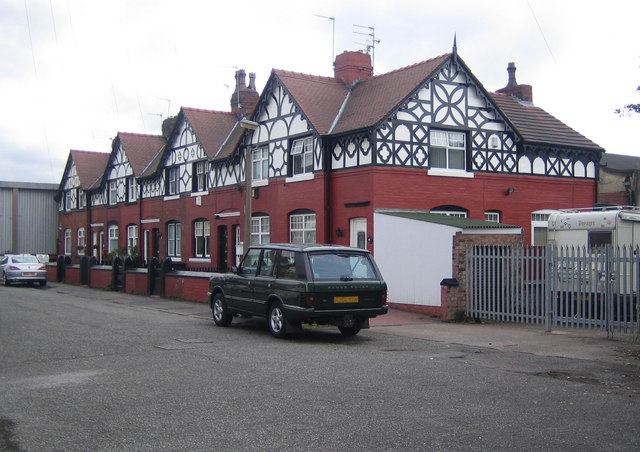
Hartley Village, Fazakerley
(c.1890; Conservation Area)

==== Victorian housing in Sandfield Park, West Derby ====
Sandfield Park, West Derby, one and a half miles south of St Mary's church was one of the most prestigious Victorian housing developments in Liverpool. Developed by T.C. Molyneux from c.1845, several of the mansions have been demolished. Sandfield Tower, now ruinous, is a stone-built Italianate mansion of c.1845, Basil Grange (1880) is a Jacobethan mansion.

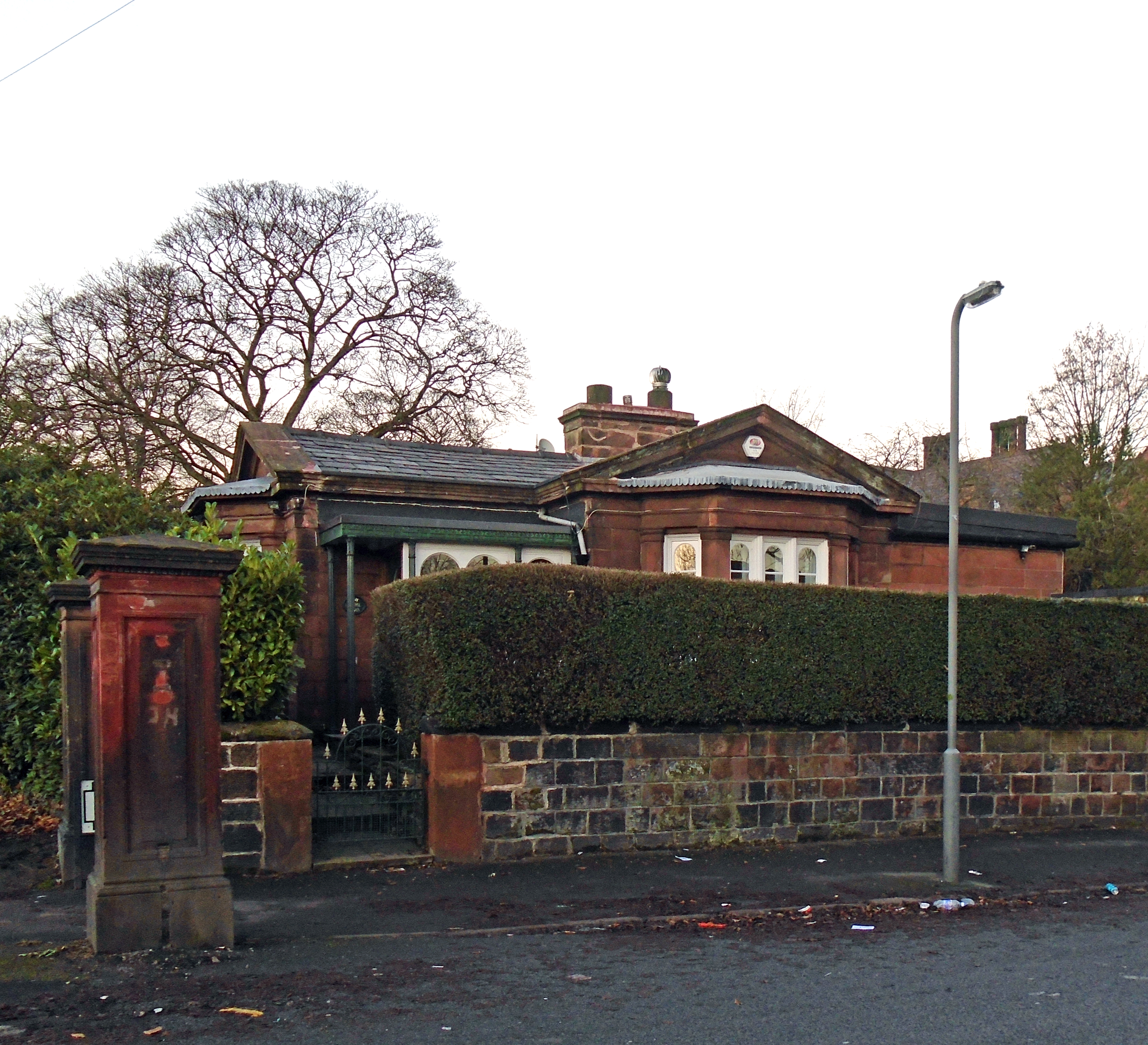
Entrance Lodge too Queen's Drive, Sandfield Park, West Derby
(c.1845; grade II)

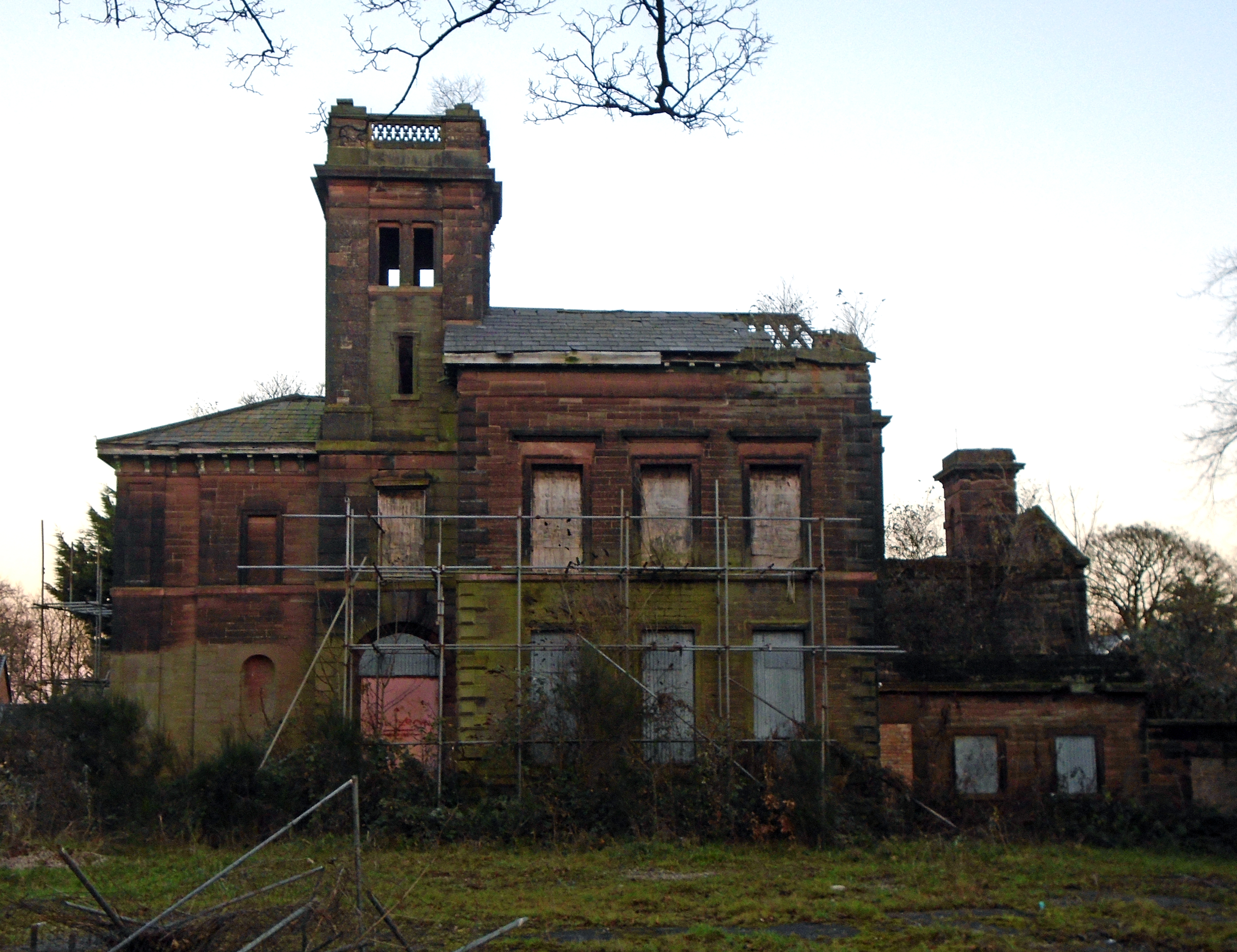
Sandfield Tower also known as Gwalia, Queen's Drive, Sandfield Park, West Derby
(c.1845; grade II)

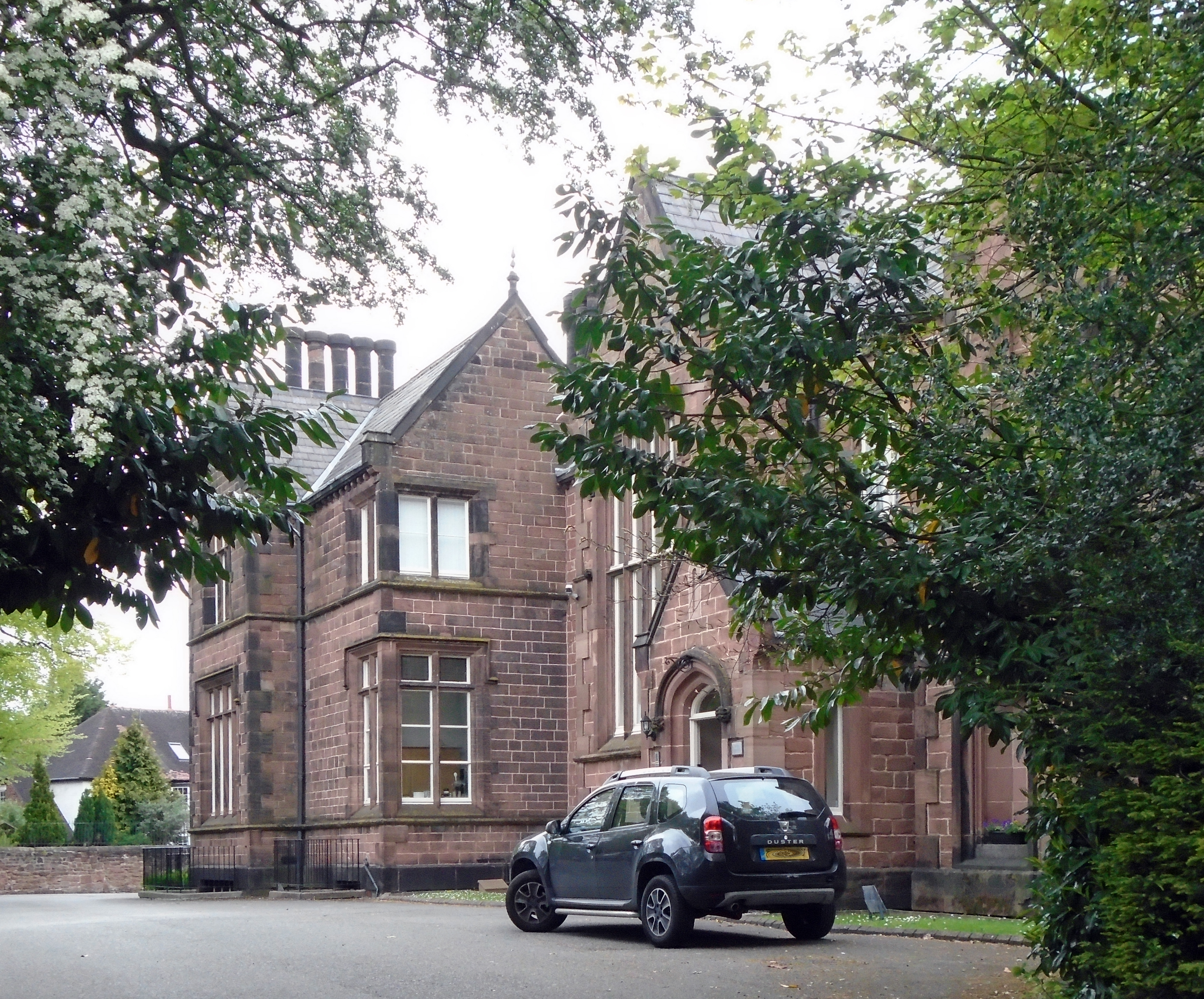
Basil Grange, Queen's Drive, Sandfield Park, West Derby
(1880; grade II)

==== Victorian housing in Sandown Park, Victoria Park, and other areas of Wavertree ====
Sandown Park is a residential estate laid out in the late 1840s designed by Cornelius Sherlock in a picturesque manner. Only a few of the original early Victorian villas survive; the development was aimed at the lower-middle-class. Another housing development just to the south-east of Sandown Park, not a gated community, is Victoria Park, again a lower-middle-class community started in the 1840s but halted after five houses were built, revived under a plan by William Webb that was laid out in 1862. Many of the original houses have been demolished. Also in Mill Lane are four semi-detached villas from the 1840s and 1850s. Sir James Picton designed Sandy Knowe (1847), Mill Lane, in a Jacobethan style as his home, it was converted to flats in 1975. There are several pairs of 1850s semi-detached houses in Olive Lane. Thornhill and Mossfield, on Childwall Road date from the 1850s and are both Italianate villas.

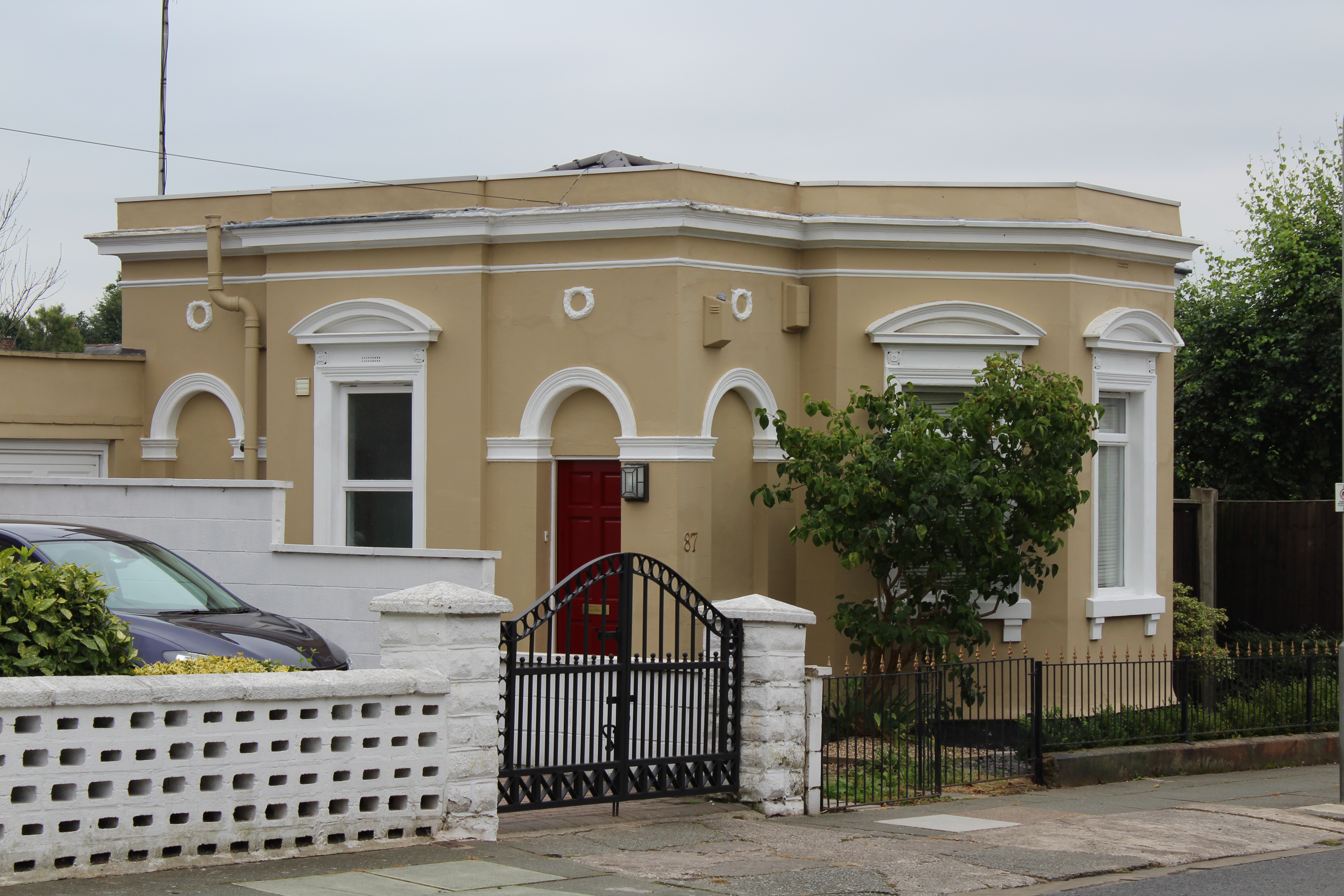
The Lodge, 87 Sandown Road, Sandown Park, Wavertree
(c.1850; Grade II)

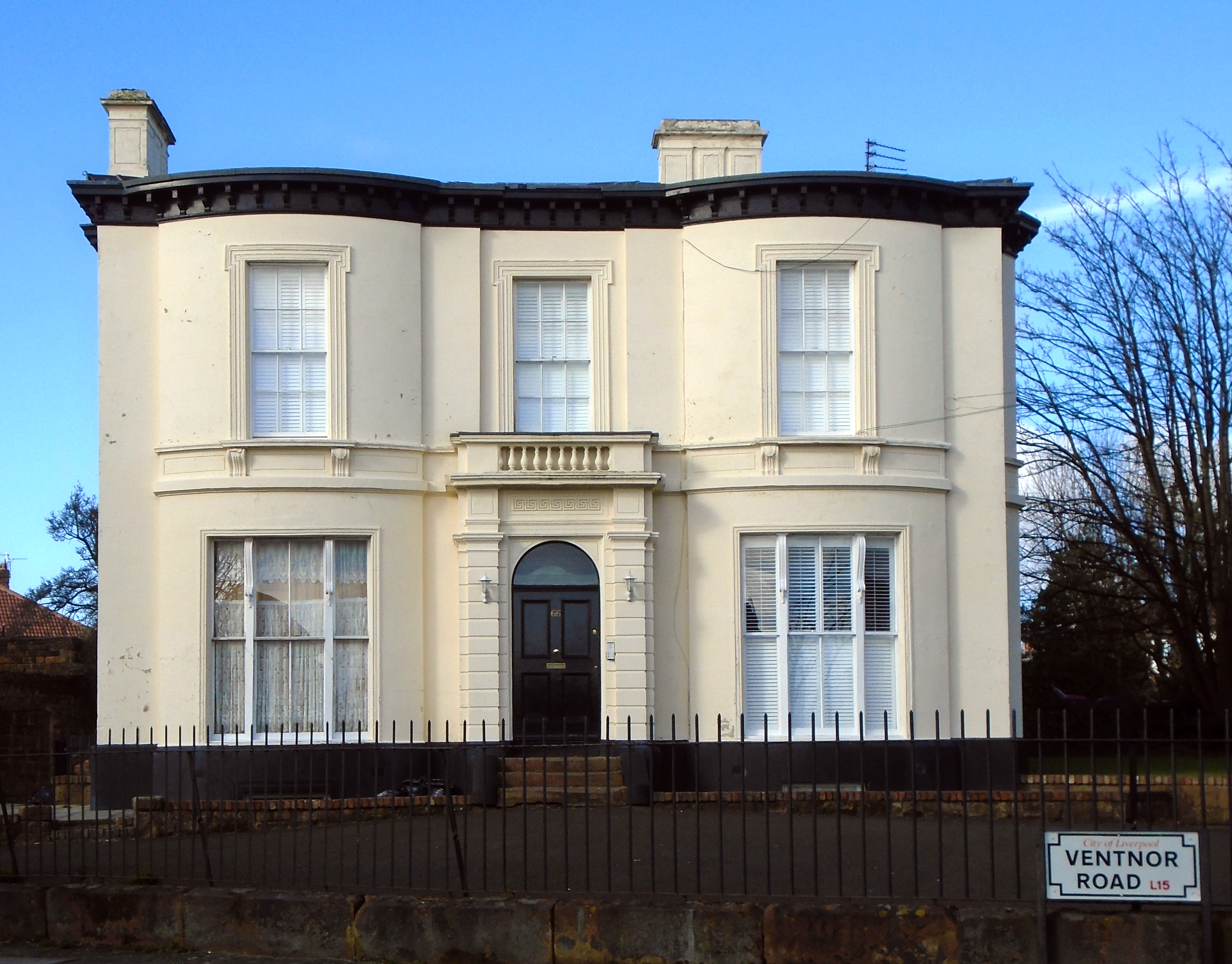
66 Sandown Road, Sandown Park, Wavertree
(c.1850; Grade II)

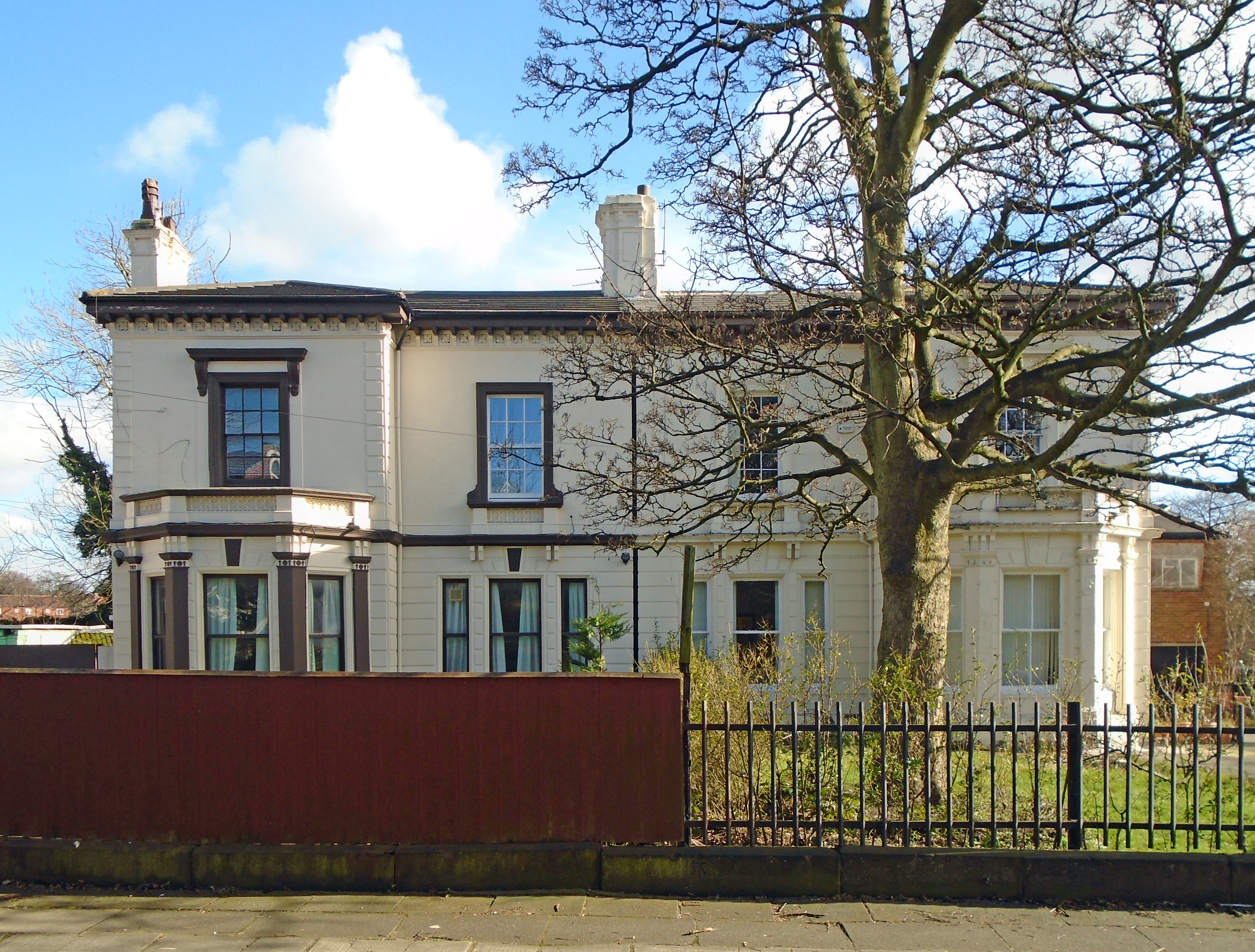
69 & 71 Sandown Road, Sandown Park, Wavertree
(c.1850; Grade II)

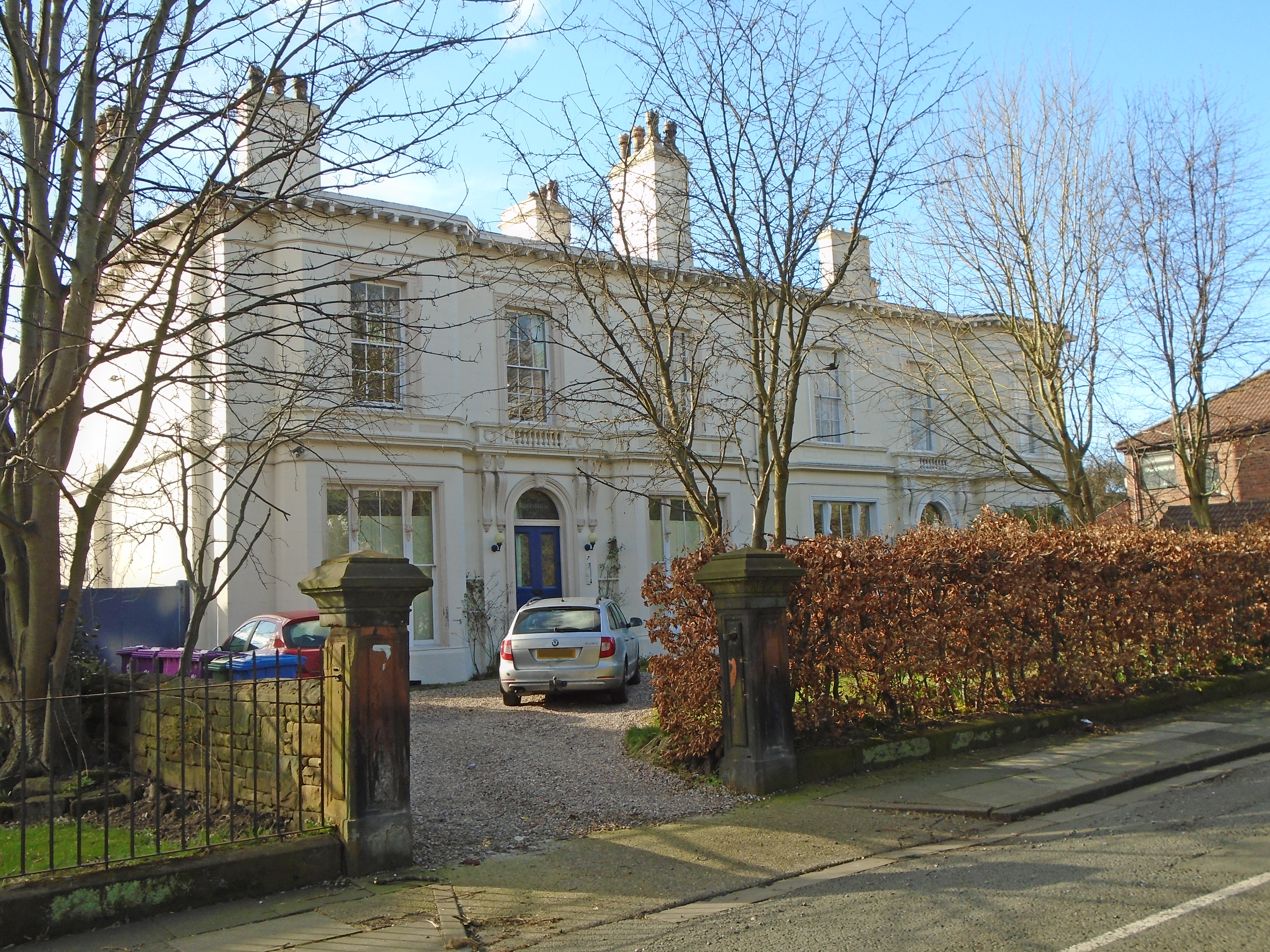
7 & 9 Shanklin Road, Sandown Park, Wavertree
(c.1850; Grade II)

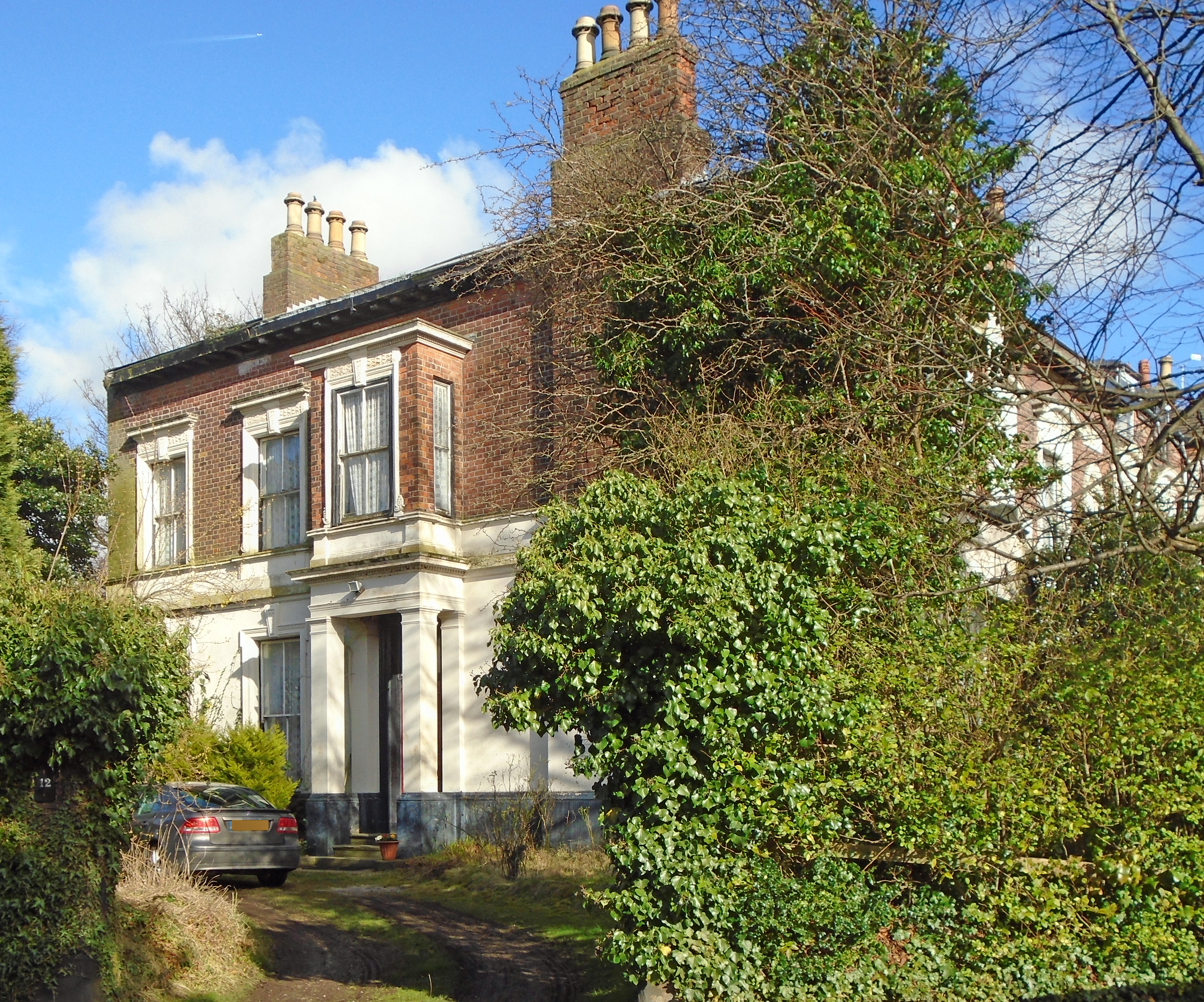
12 Shanklin Road, Sandown Park, Wavertree
(c.1850; Grade II)

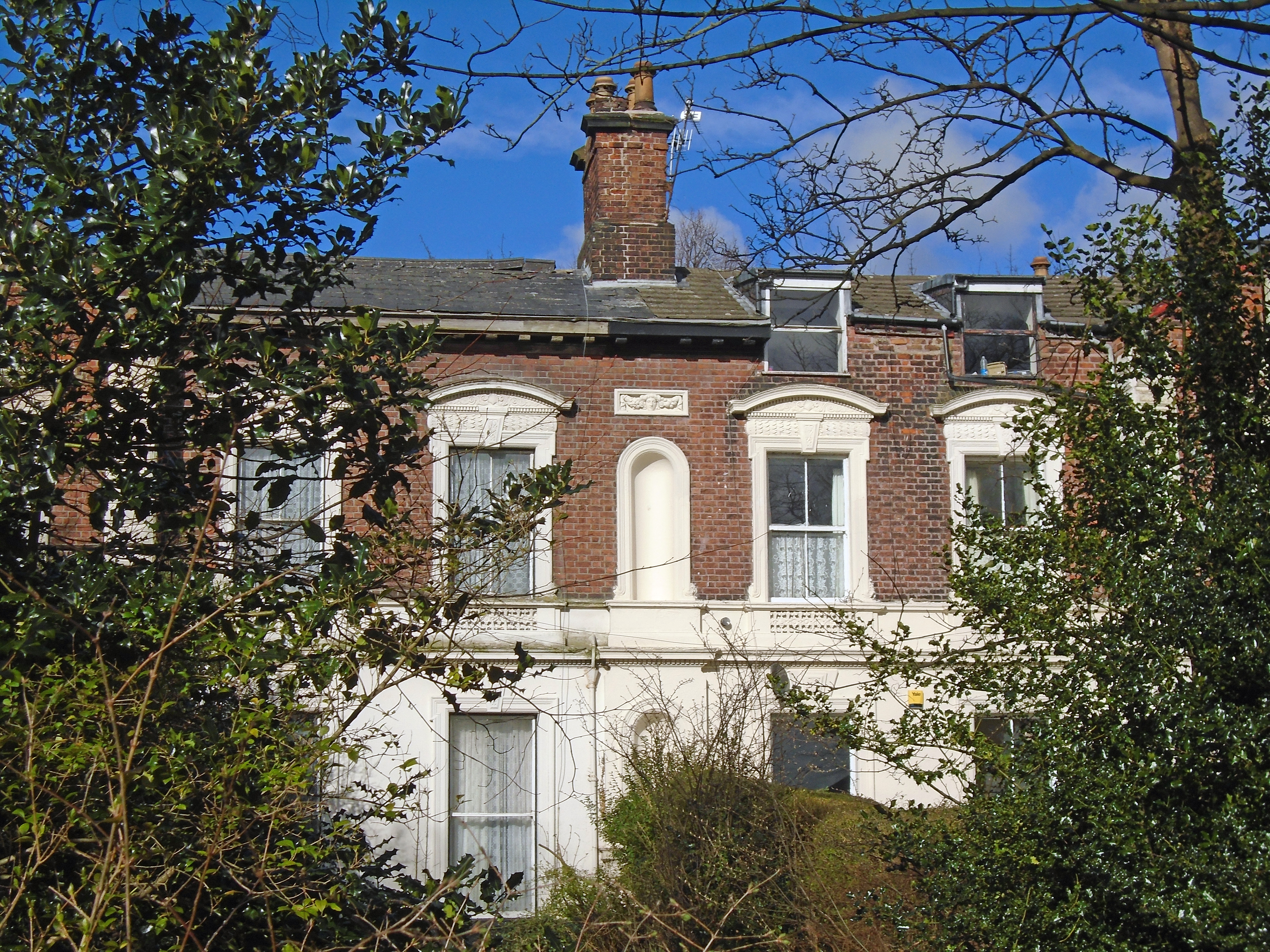
50 Shanklin Road, Sandown Park, Wavertree
(c.1850; Grade II)

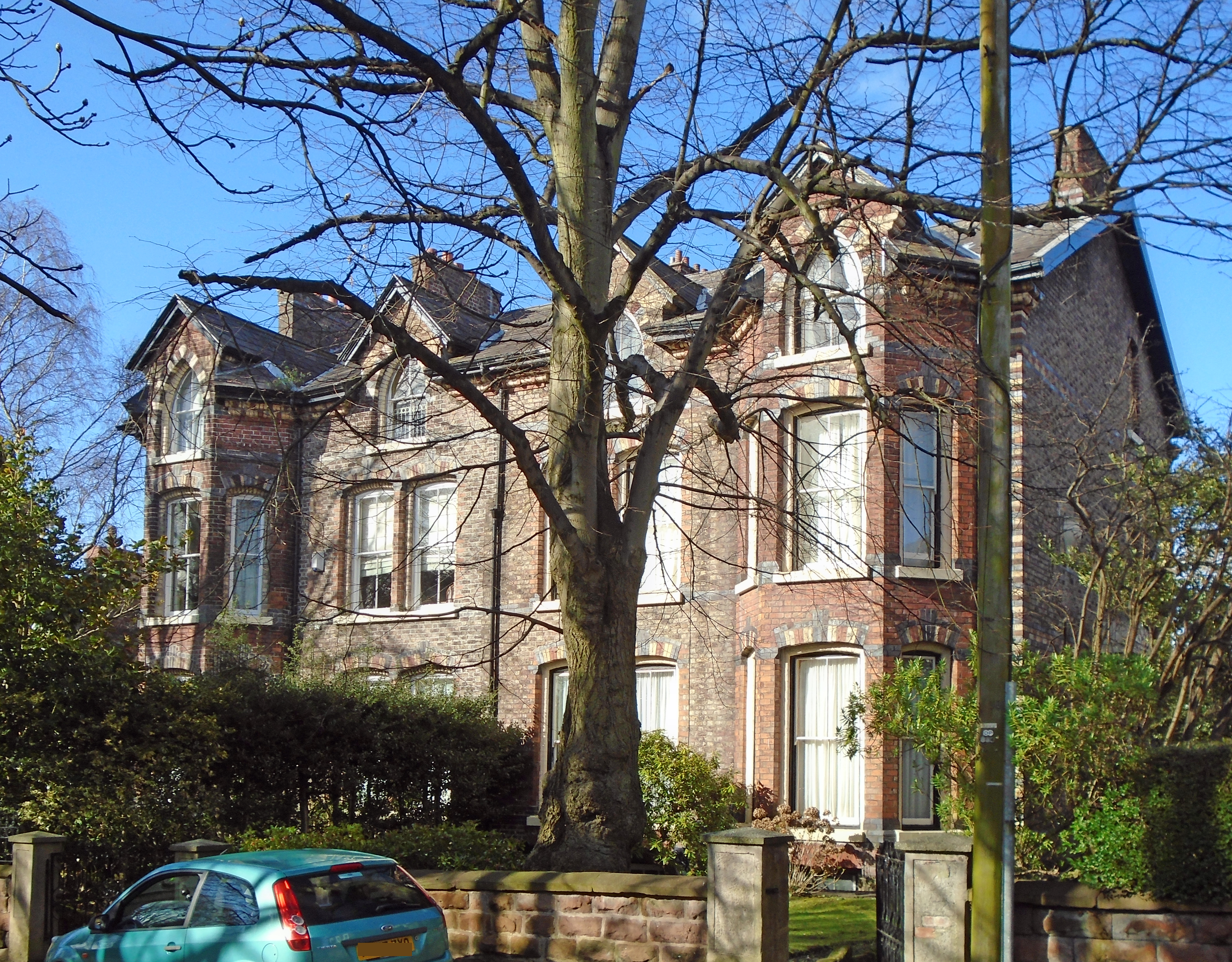
29 & 31 North Drive, Victoria Park, Wavertree
(1867; Grade II)

==== Victorian housing in Fulwood Park, Grassendale Park and Cressington Park, Aigburth ====
There are three private developments of the era in Aigburth, laid along the banks of the Mersey. Fulwood Park, the oldest development is just to the south of Sefton Park and was developed in the 1840s and 1850s with a series of stuccoed villas in leafy gardens, largely occupied by merchants. One and half miles to the south of Fulwood Park is Grassendale Park, and finally to the immediate south of Grassendale Park is Cressington Park. Otterspool Promenade links the developments.

The first was Fulwood Park, which started in 1840, with a density of one house per acre, with a minimum outlay of £1,500 per house (roughly £151,500 in 2019). The developers were merchants and brothers William & Alexander Smith. The development consists of a single road stretching from Aigburth Road to the Mersey; the villas are typical of the era, some Italianate of the 1840s and 1850s, some Gothic of the 1860s. By 1871 eighteen houses had been built. In the 20th century, there was much infill development on subdivided plots.

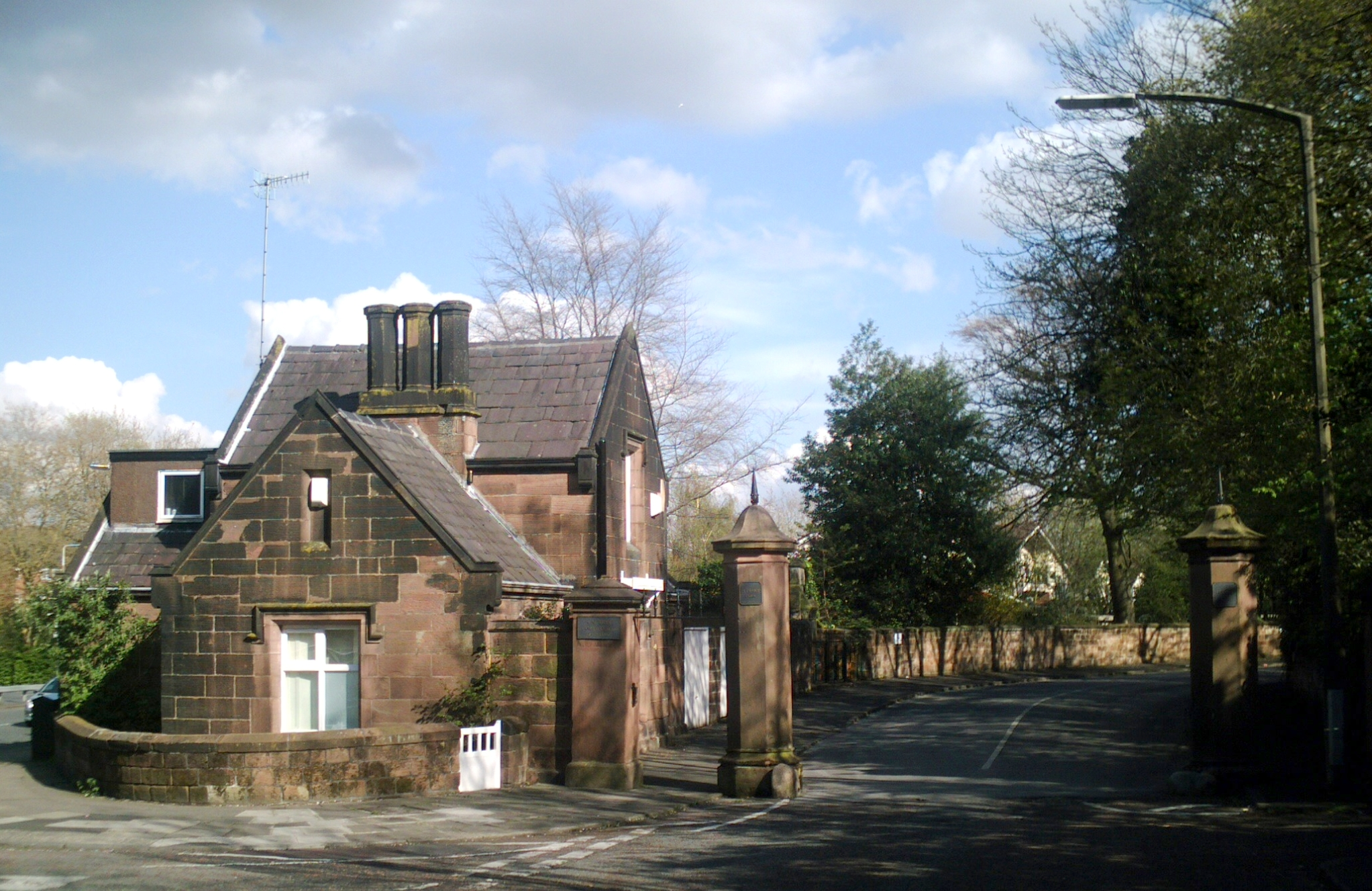
Entrance Lodge, 1a Fulwood Park, Aigburth
(c.1840; Grade II)

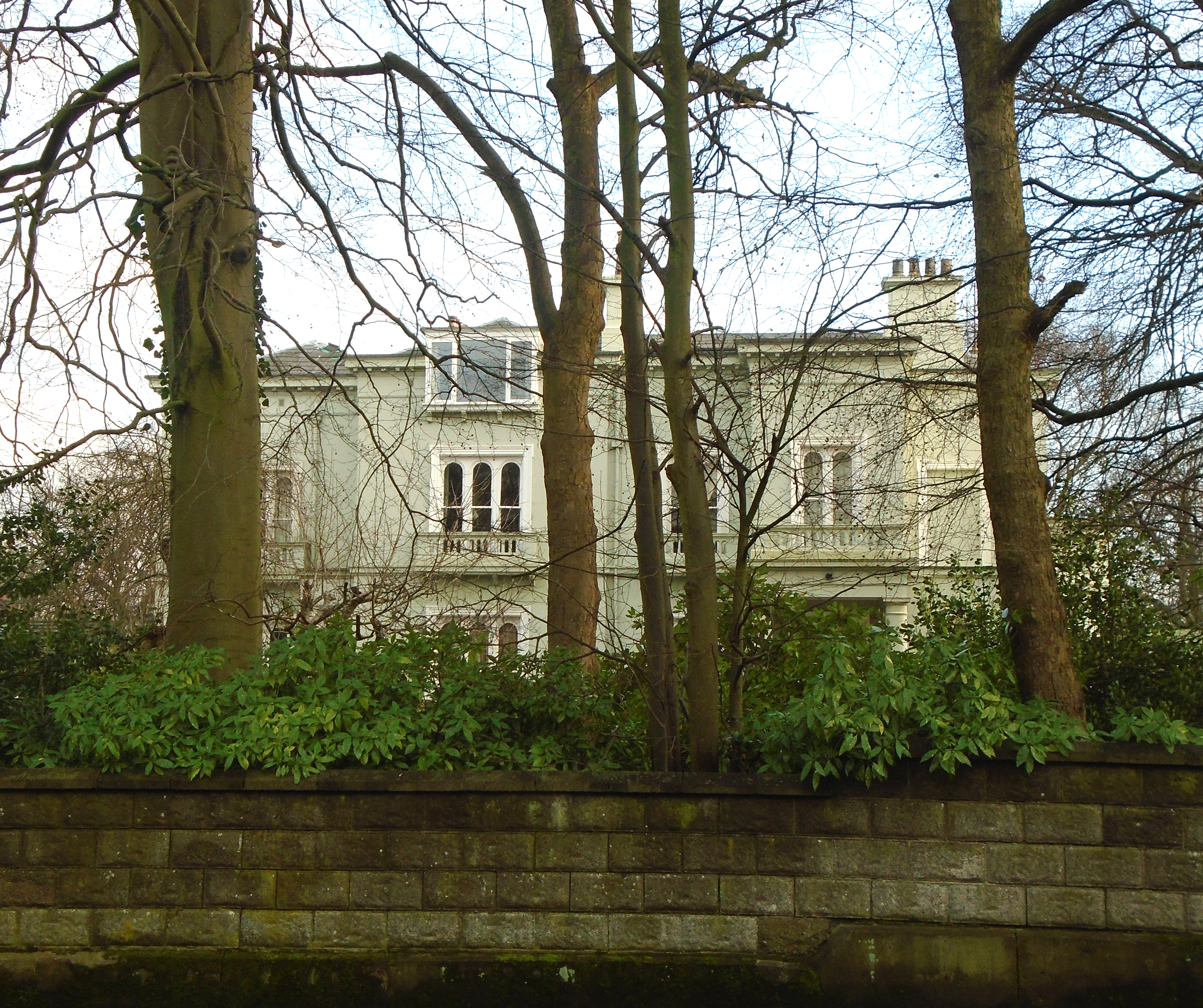
3 Fulwood Park, Aigburth
(c.1840; Grade II)

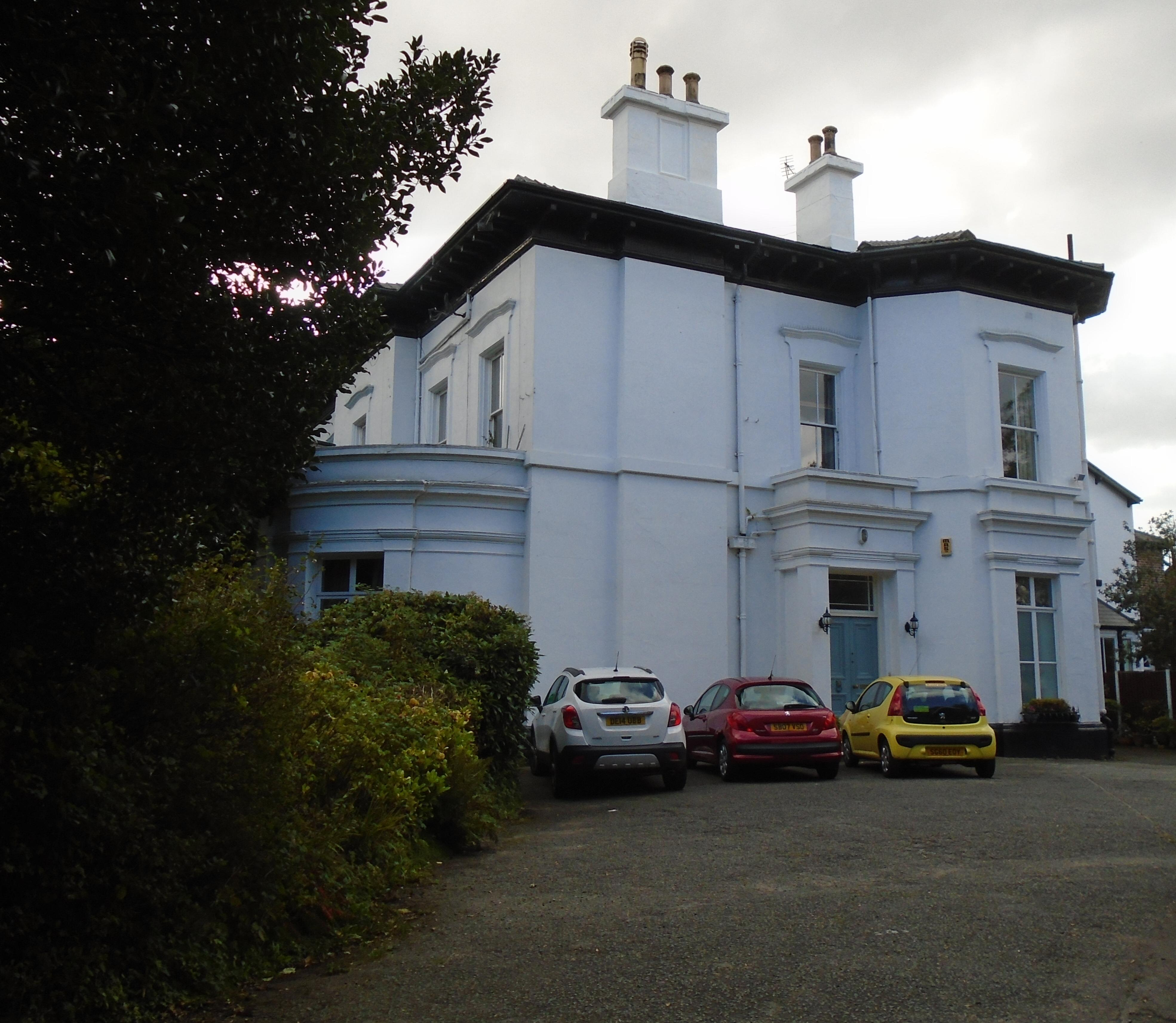
4 Fulwood Park, Aigburth
(c.1840; Grade II)

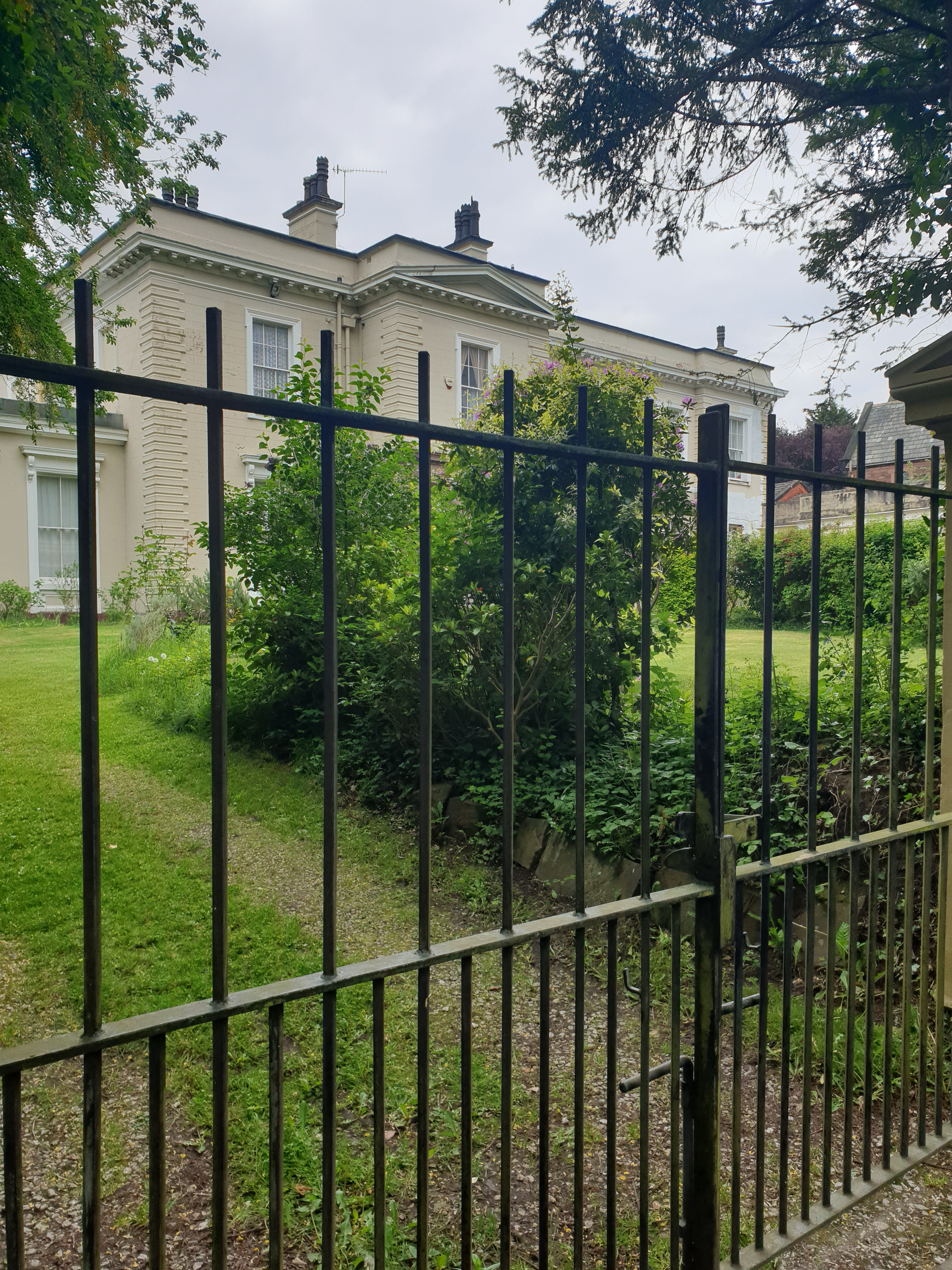
5A & 5B Fulwood Park, Aigburth
(c.1840; Grade II)

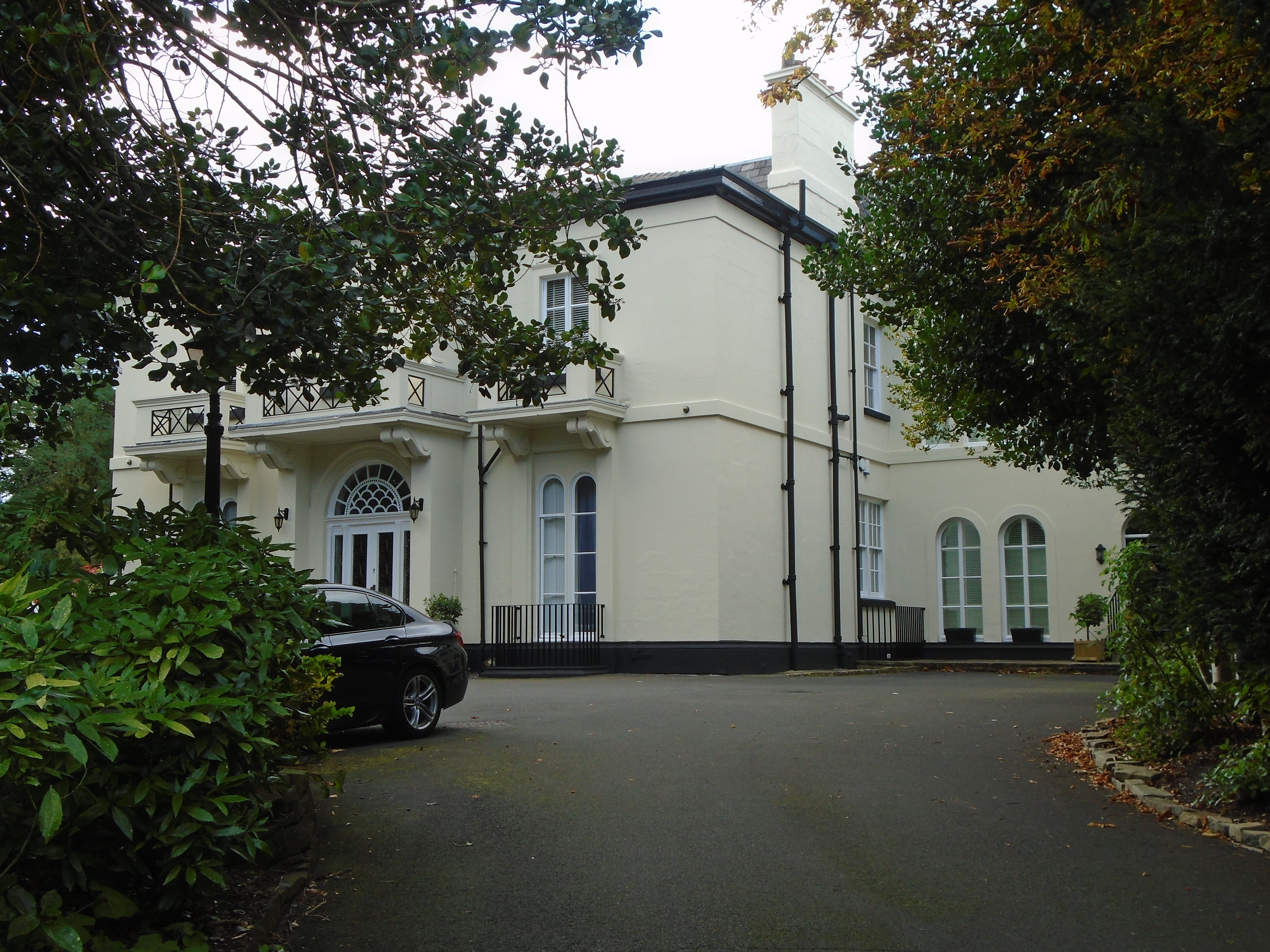
Parklea, 6 Fulwood Park, Aigburth
(c.1840; Grade II)

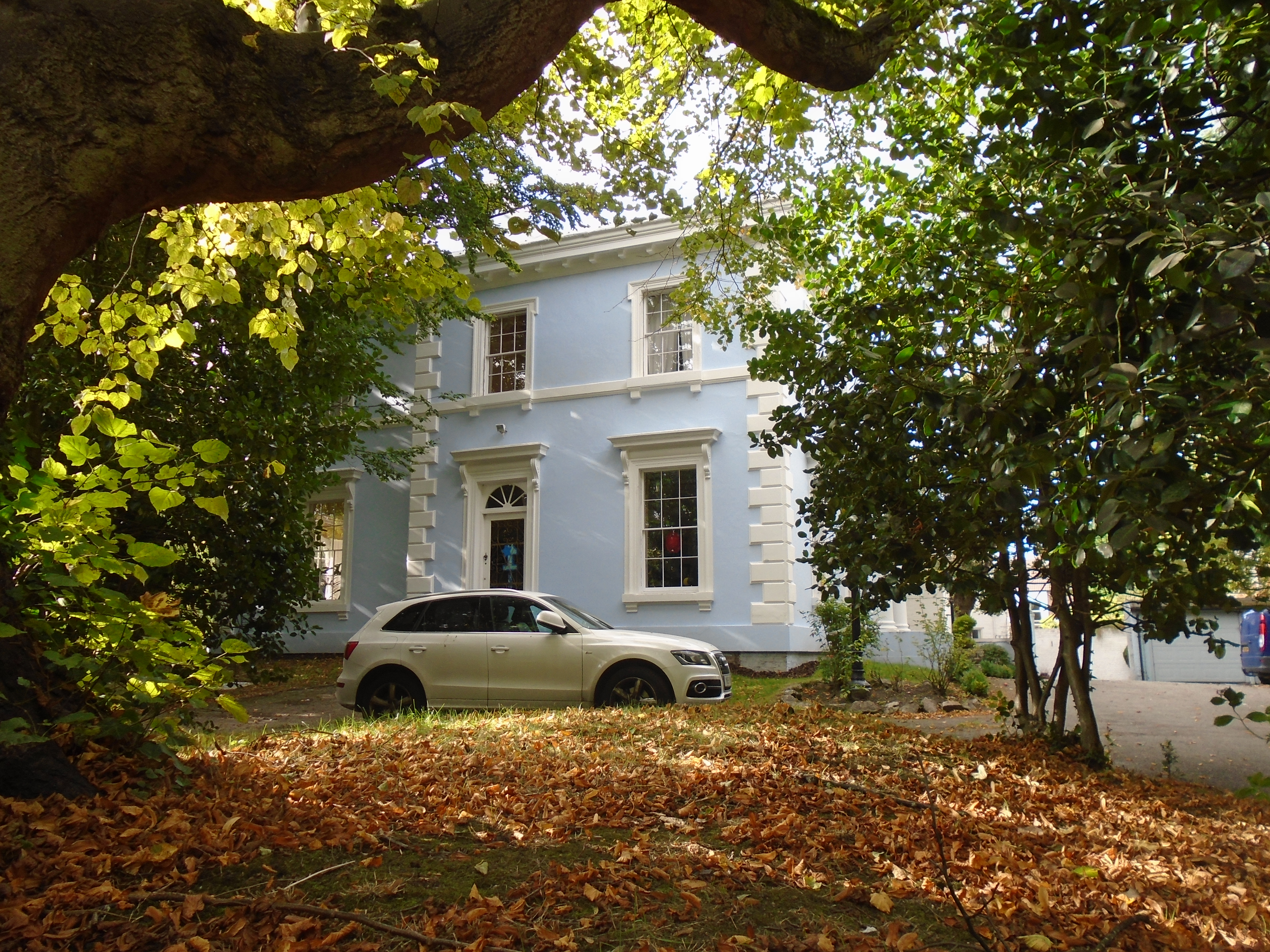
8 Fulwood Park, Aigburth
(c.1840; Grade II)

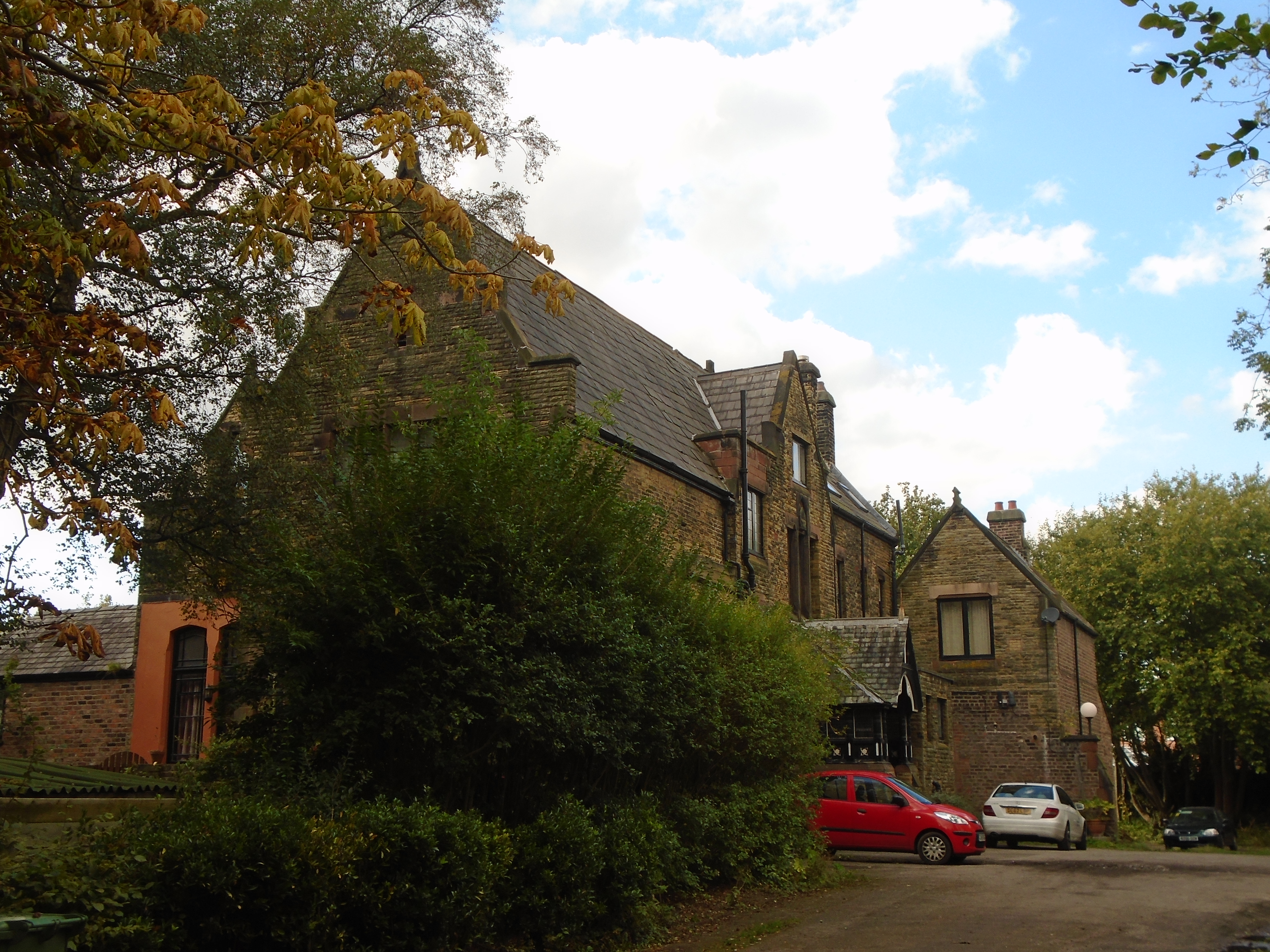
The Grange, 12 Fulwood Park, Aigburth
(1860s; unlisted)

The second of these developments by the Aigburth Land Company was Grassendale, on 20 acres of land by the Mersey, which dates from 1845 and continued developing to the end of the century. This was laid out with four houses per acre. The development consists of two parallel roads, North Road and South Road, connected by the Esplanade along the river; at the other end South Road turns to meet North Road. By 1851 there were 11 houses and by 1891 there were 35. The earlier houses are of more architectural interest than the later ones. The earlier houses are stuccoed and semi-detached or detached residences.

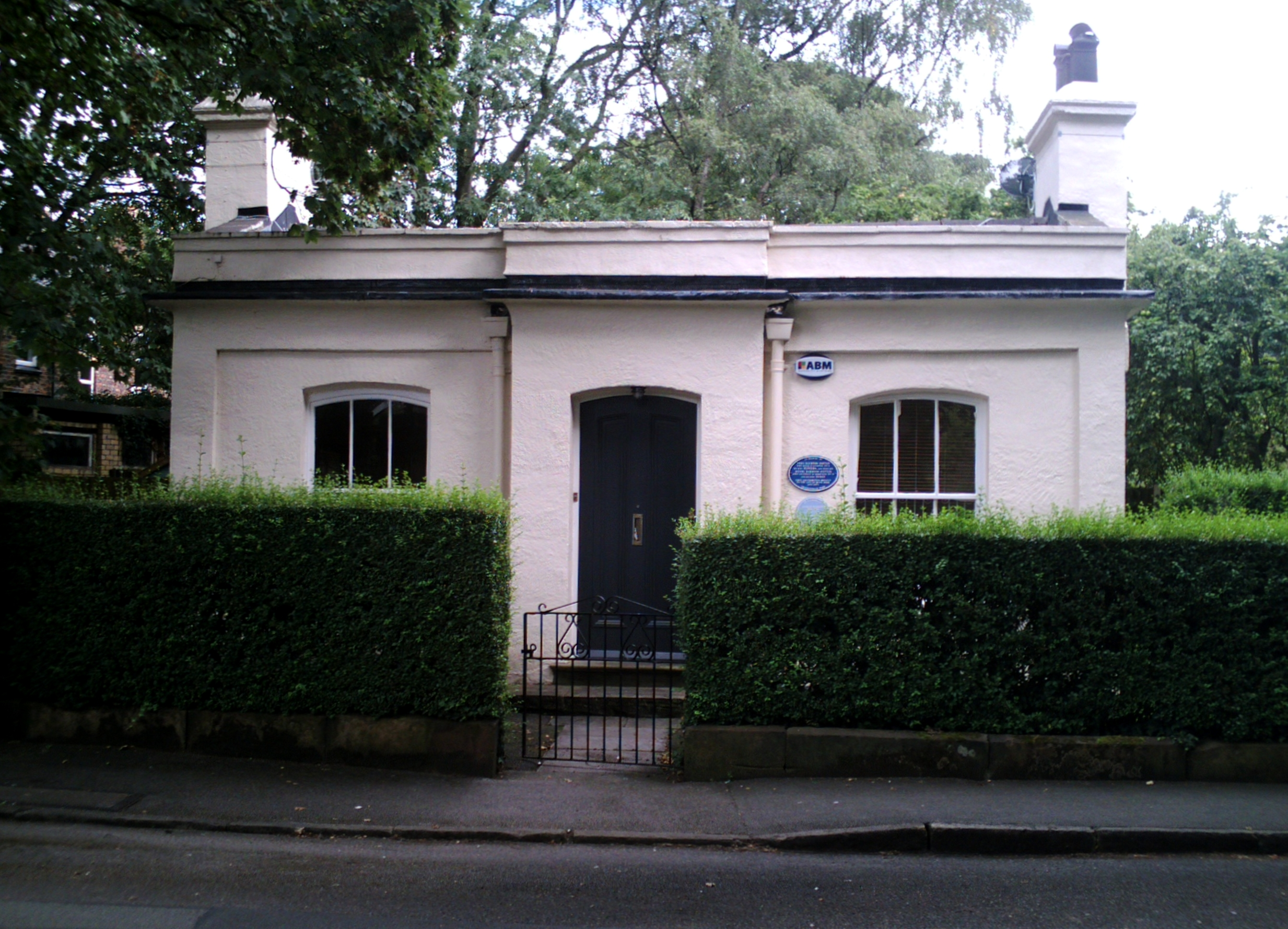
1 North Road, (acted as an entrance lodge to the development), Grassendale Park, Aigburth
(1840s; Grade II)

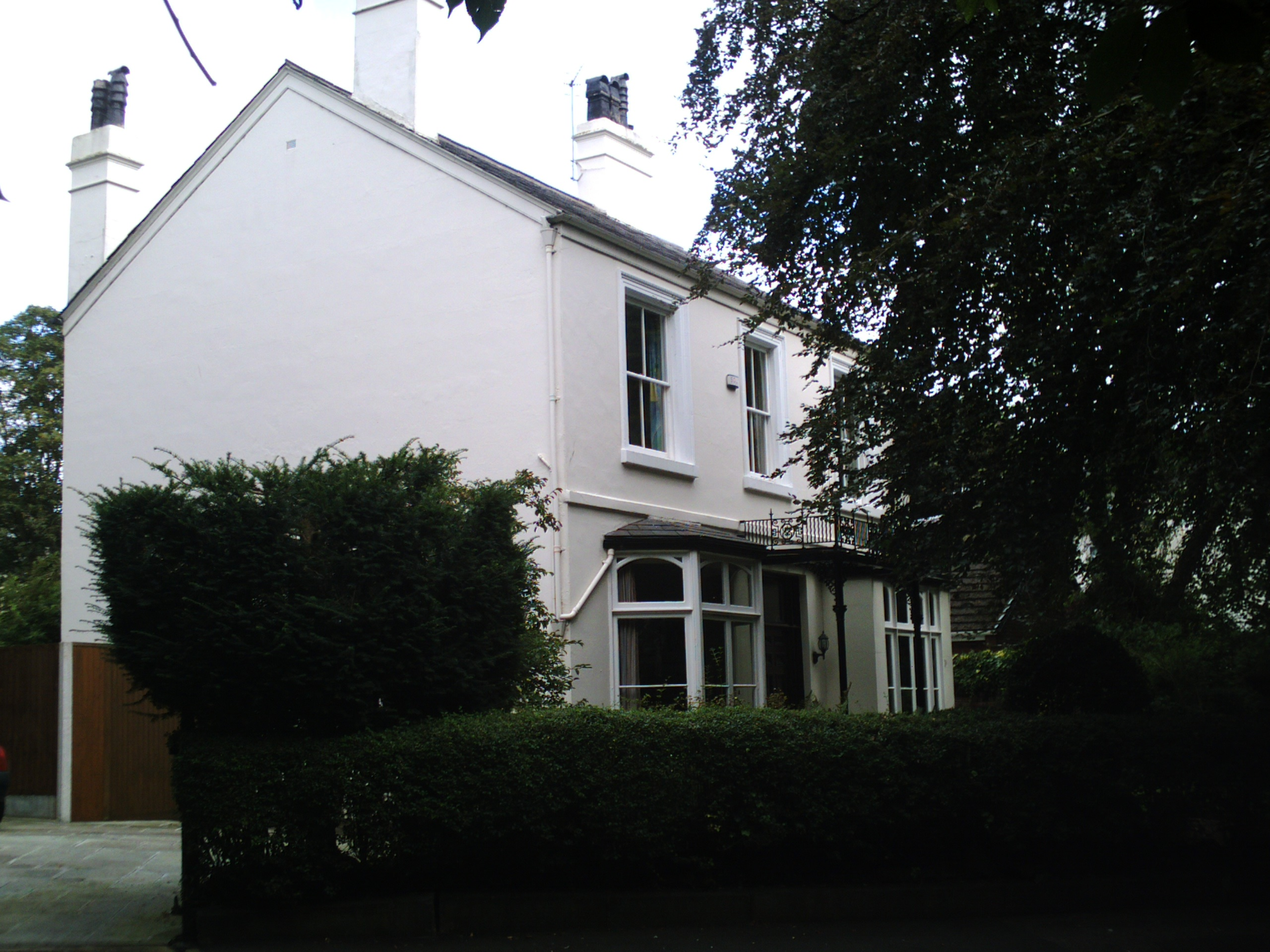
Arcadia, 3 North Road, Grassendale Park, Aigburth
(1840s; Grade II)

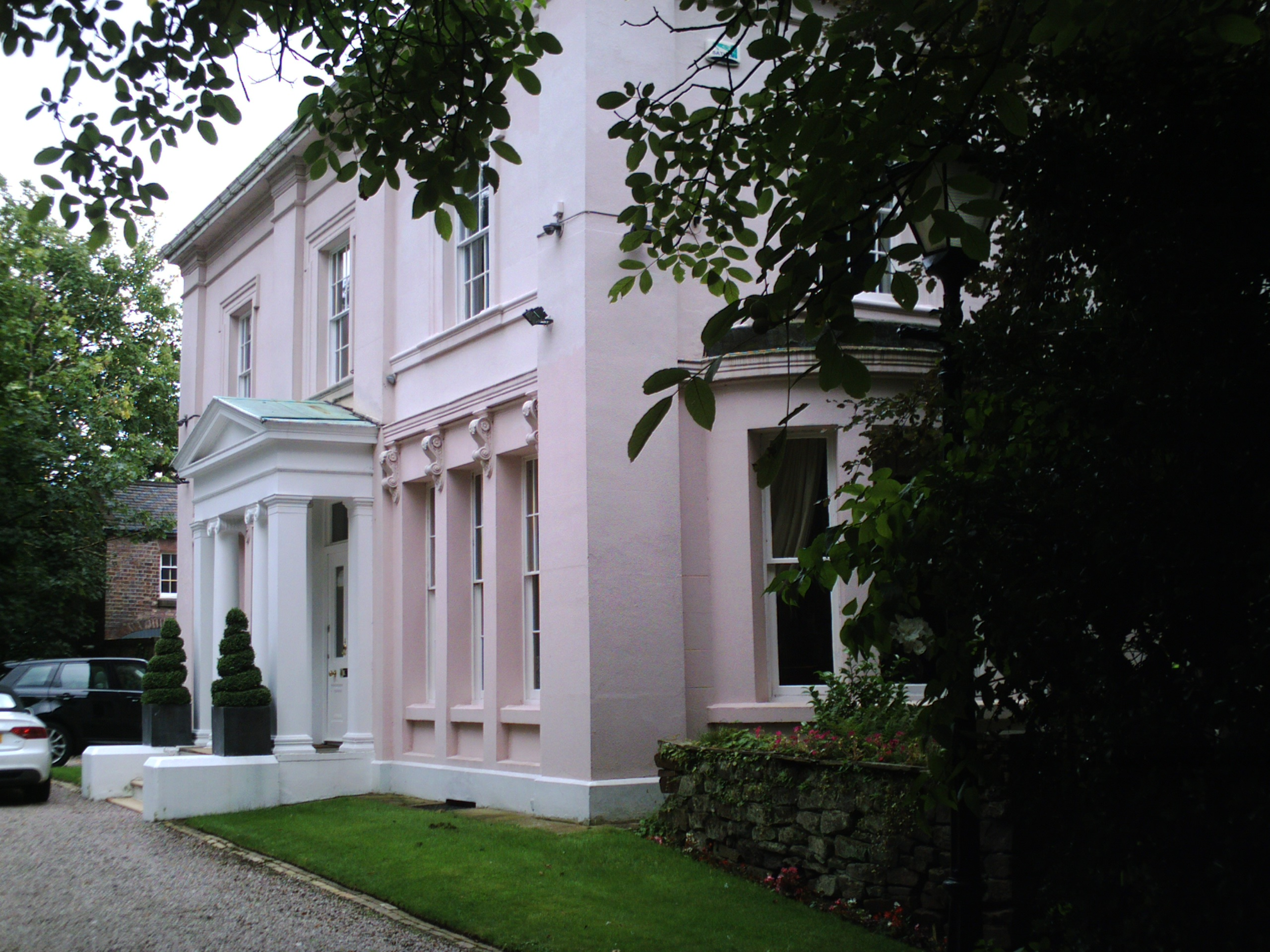
Ormiston, 5 North Road, Grassendale Park, Aigburth
(1840s; Grade II)

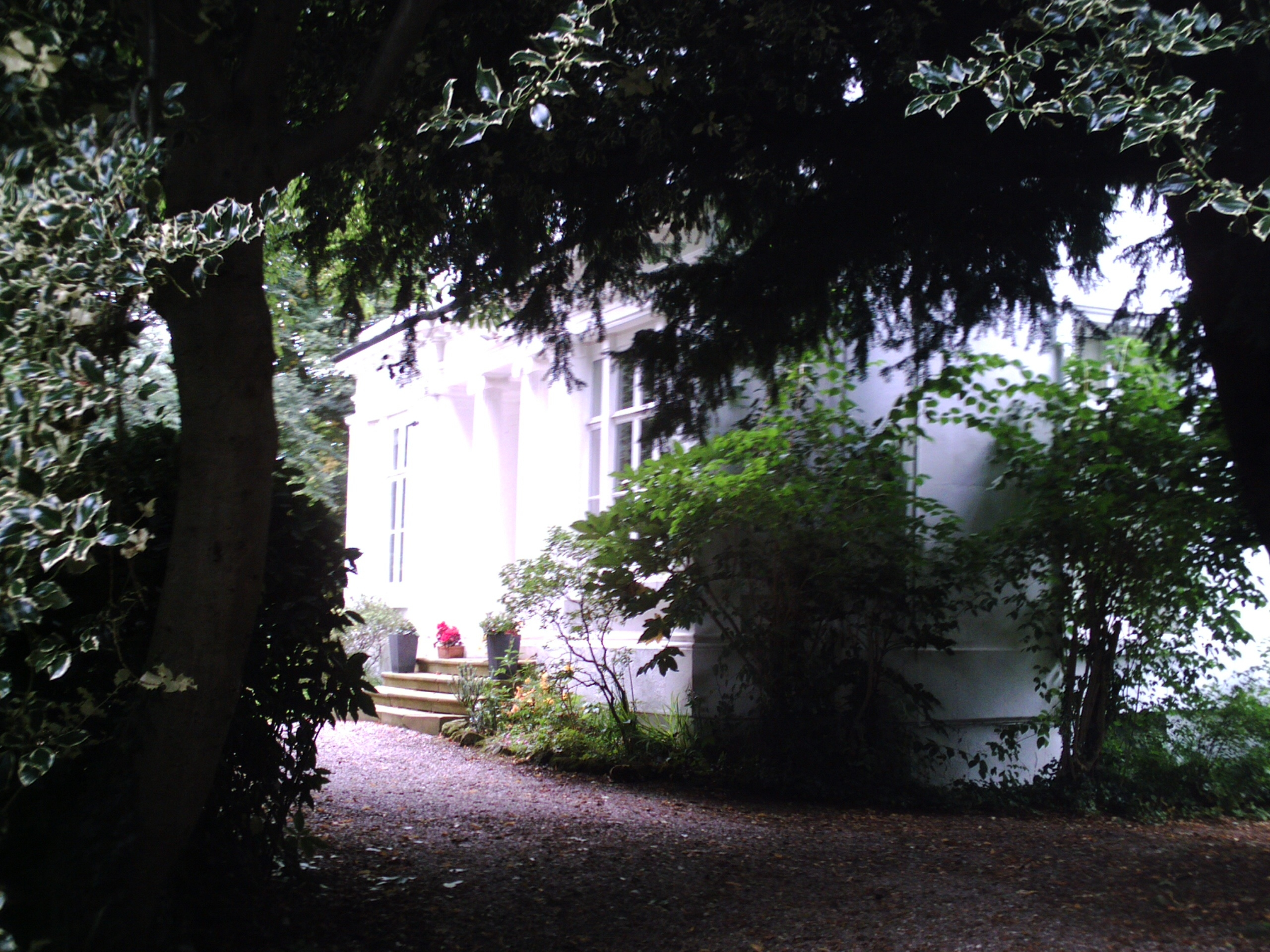
Norton, 10 North Road, Grassendale Park, Aigburth
(1840s; Grade II)

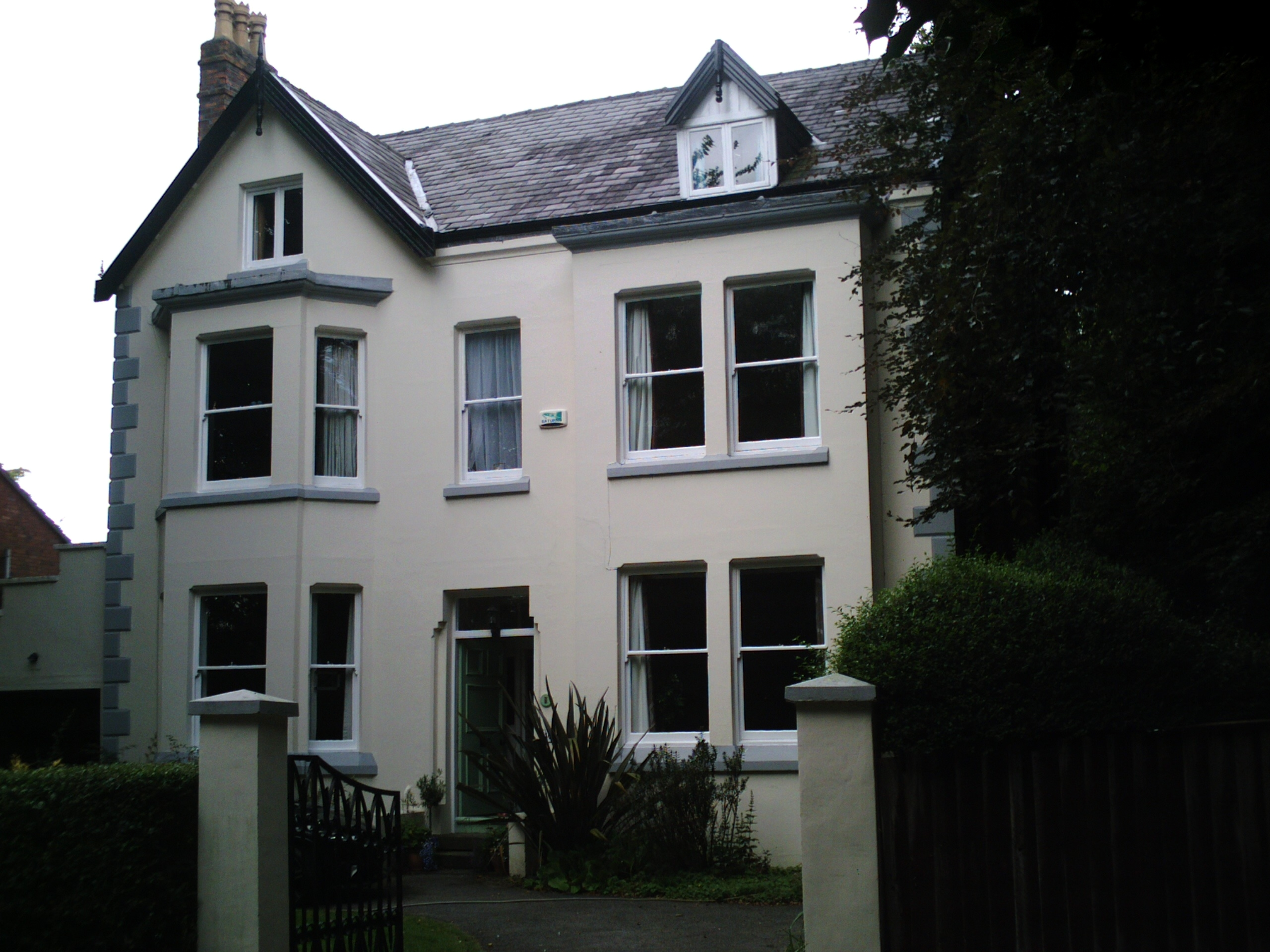
Angorfa, 14 North Road, Grassendale Park, Aigburth
(1840s; Grade II)

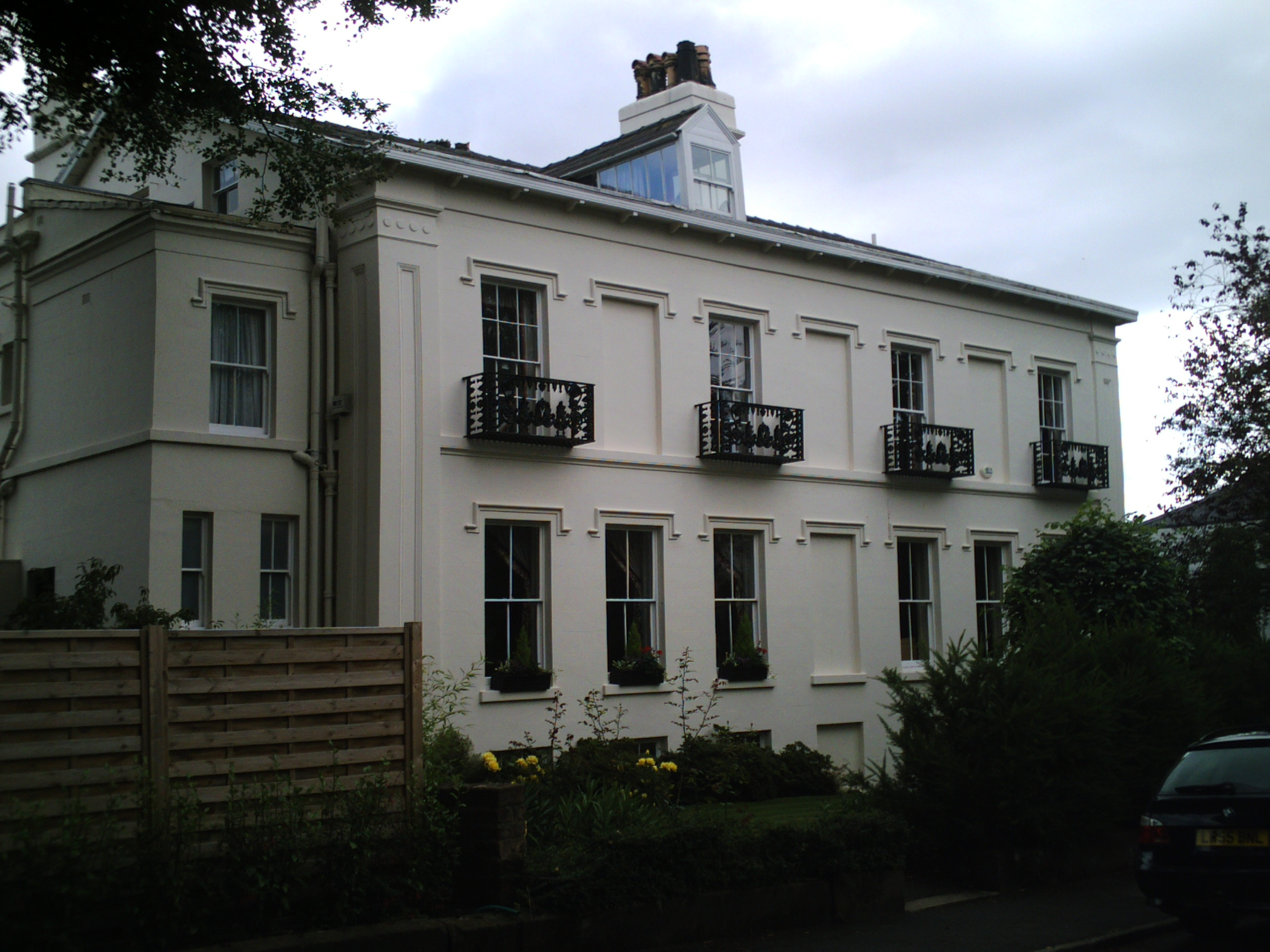
Langdale & Holt Houses, 23 & 25 North Road, Grassendale Park, Aigburth
(1840s; Grade II)

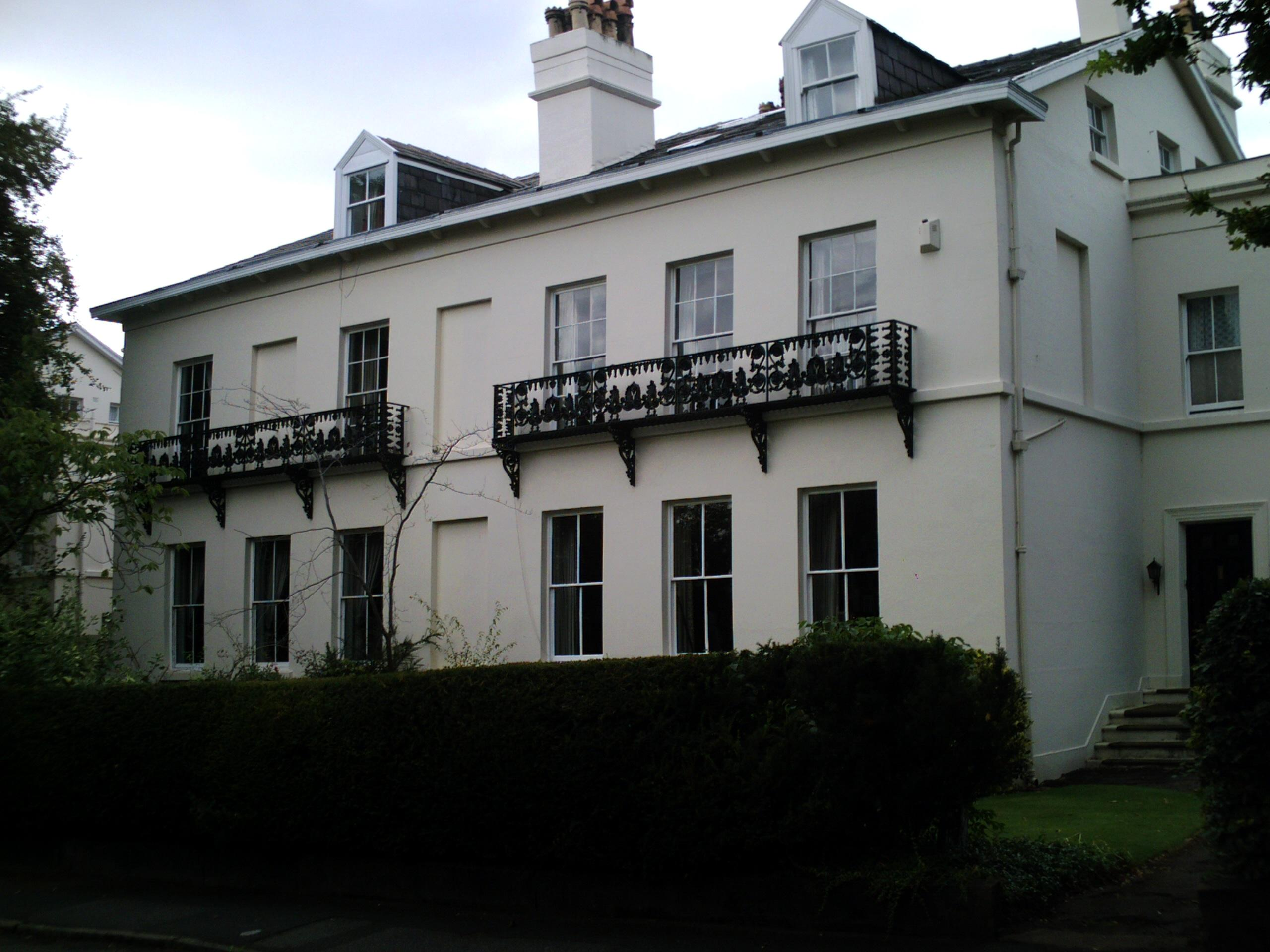
Wenstead & Woodside, 24 & 26 North Road, Grassendale Park, Aigburth
(1840s; Grade II)

The third and largest of the developments was Cressington Park, developed by the Second Aigburth Land Company formed in 1846, and laid out at four houses per acre. Henry Summers won a competition to plan the development, and the plan was amended by Mr Gray. There were 172 lots purchased between 1851 and 1870. The layout consists of two almost parallel roads, Knowsley Road and Salisbury Road, linked halfway along their lengths by Grosvenor Road. From the centre of Grosvenor a third road, Eaton Road, runs parallel to the two main roads; the three roads are joined along the Mersey by Cressington Esplanade. Just within the development lies Cressington railway station, on Salisbury Road, near the entrance lodge. Apart from the Entrance Lodge, none of the houses are listed.

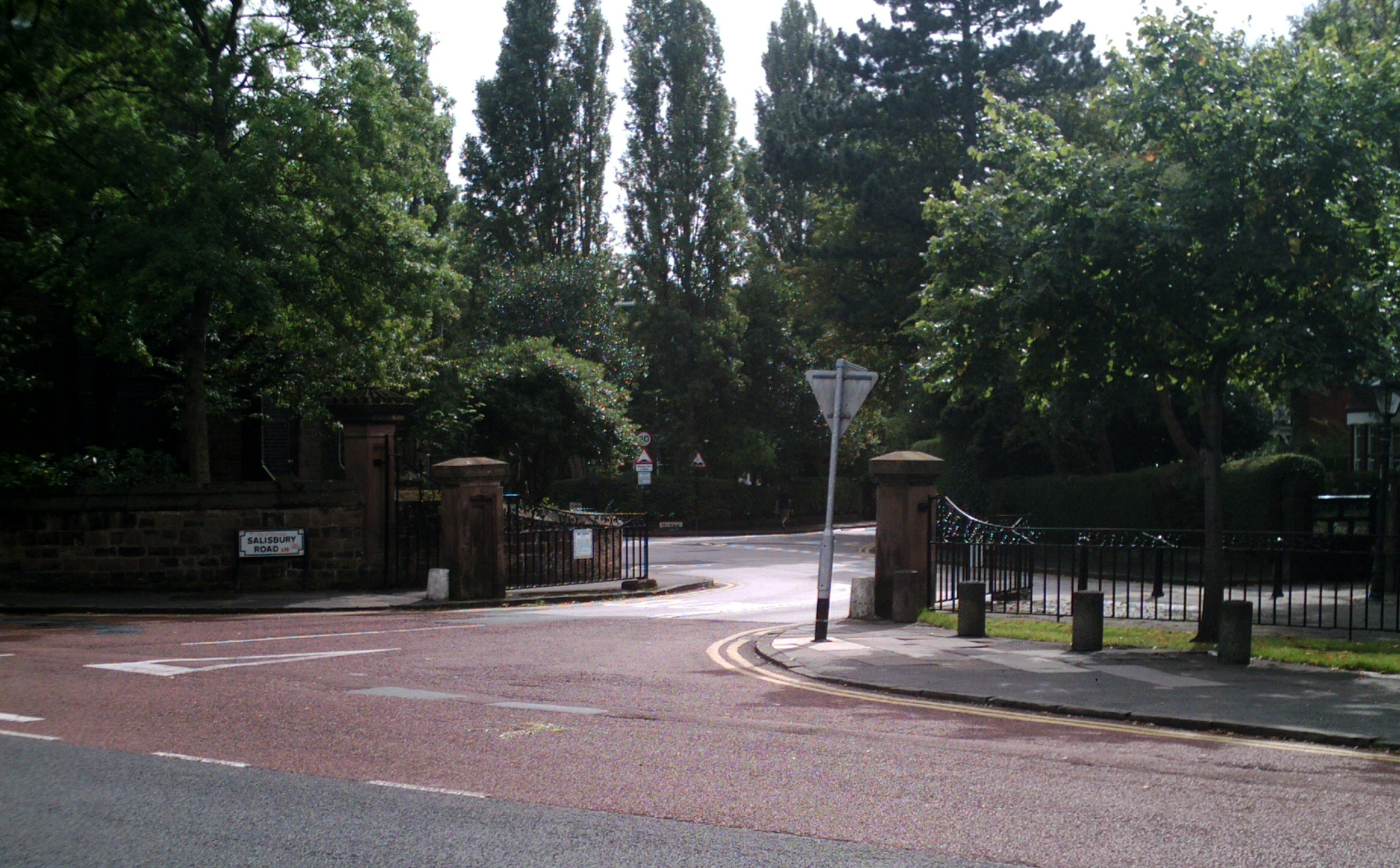
Entrance Gates to Cressington Park, Aigburth
(1852; Grade II)

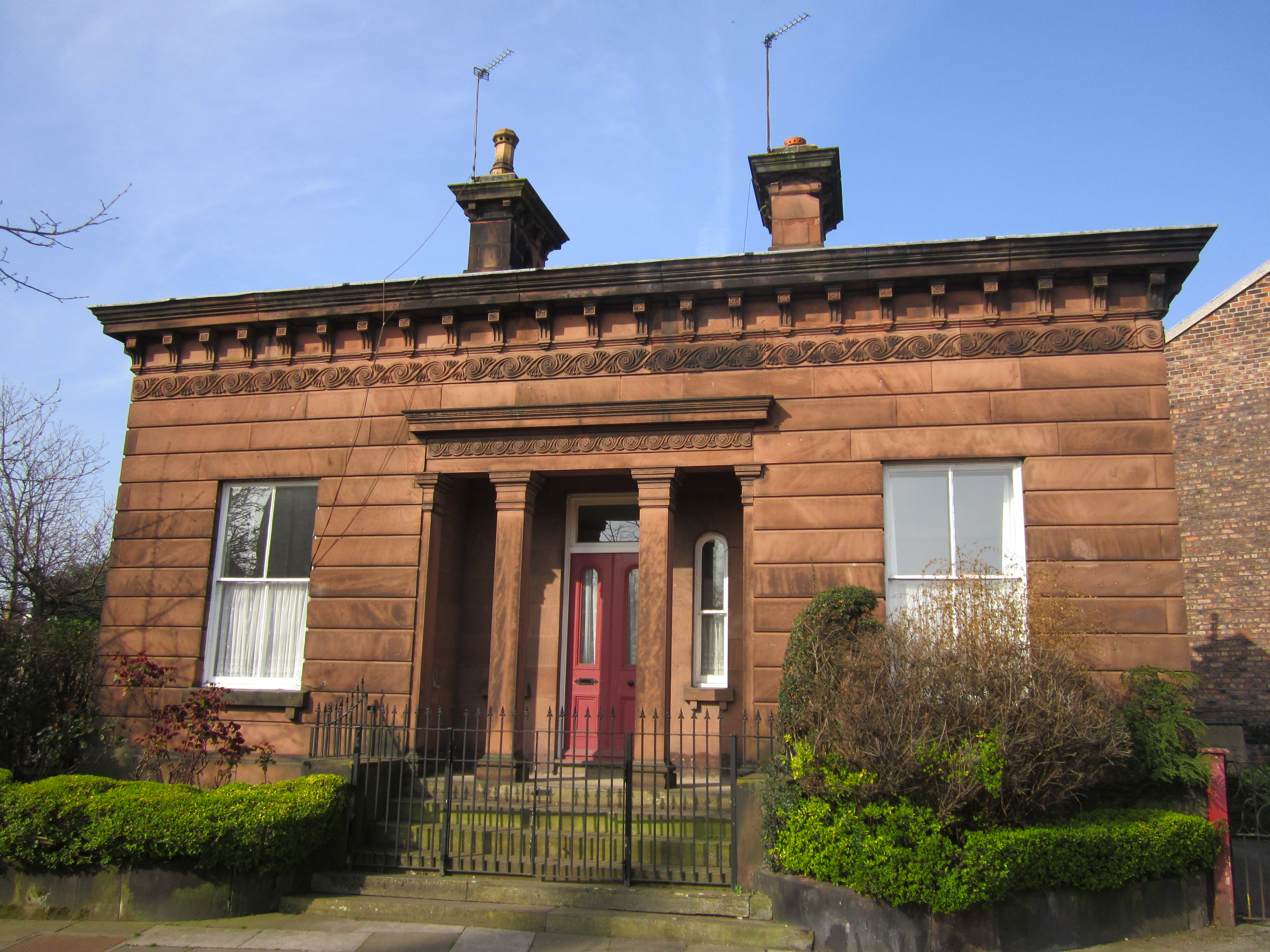
The Lodge, Cressington Park, Aigburth Road, Aigburth
(1852; Grade II)

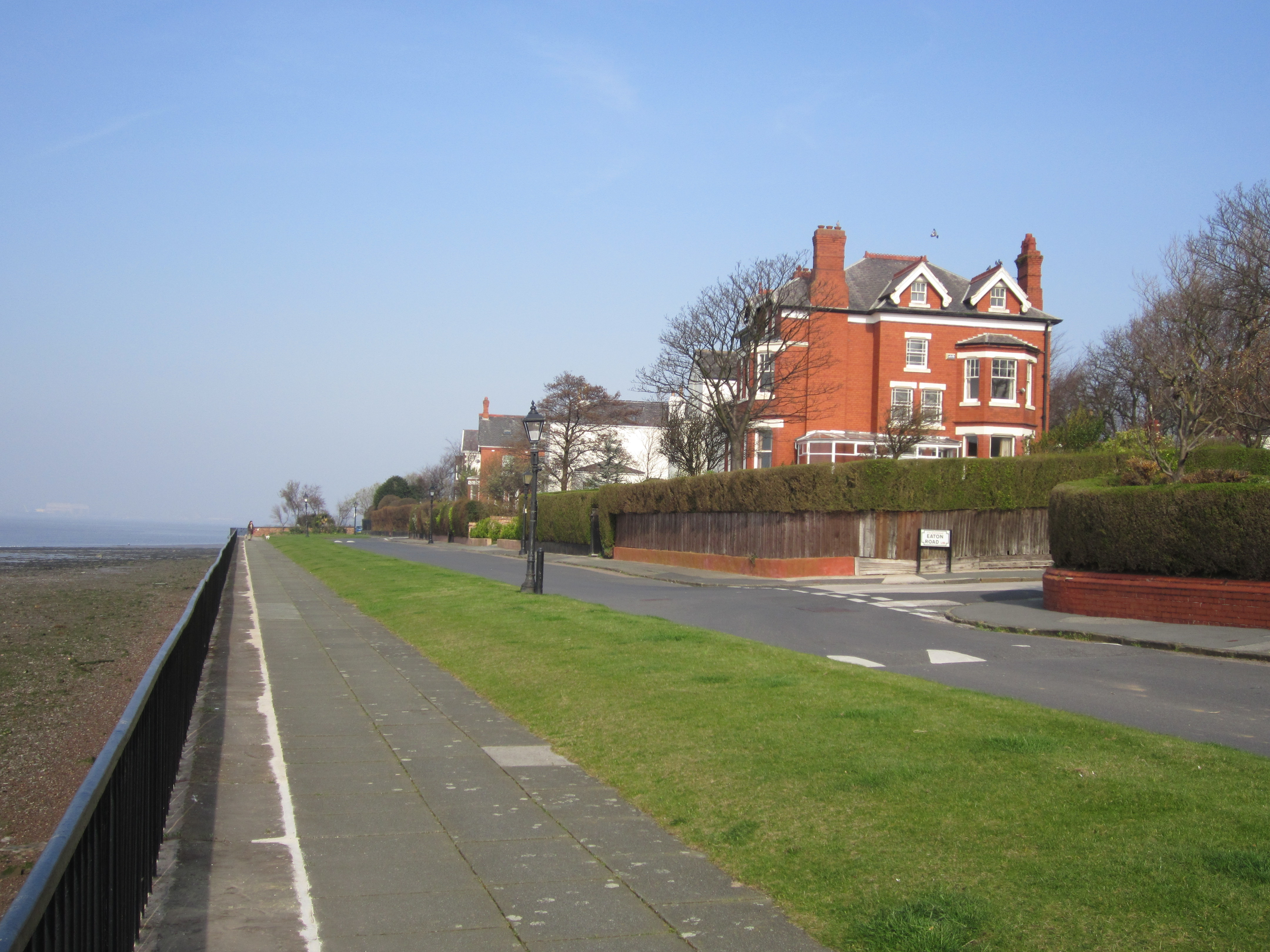
Cressington Esplanade, Cressington Park, Aigburth

==== Victorian housing around Princes Park and Sefton Park ====
Princes Road was created in the 1840s to connect the central Liverpool area of Canning to the then-new Prince's Park. In the 1870s it was doubled in width by the addition of Princes Avenue; they are separated by a grass verge lined with trees. A rare example of a boulevard in the city, the new road was lined by three-storey houses in the 1870s and 1880s. The streets surrounding Prince's Park were attractive places to live and have much middle-class housing including Belvidere Road, Croxteth Road, Windmere Terrace, Devonshire Road and Ullet Road, largely from the 1850s to 1860s and beyond. Prince's Park Mansions is a large terrace built in 1843 to designs by Wyatt Papworth. After the creation of Sefton Park in the early 1870s adjoining streets became desirable places to live. Houses on the central section of Ullet Road backed onto the park, and Mossley Hill Drive on the eastern edge of the park and Aigburth Drive on the western edge were all highly desirable places to live, resulting in many large mansions being built in the 1870s and 1880s.

The most notable house in the area is The Towers (1874), 44 Ullet Road, a large Gothic pile, built for cotton broker Michael Belcher and designed by George Ashdown Audsley. Ullet Grange (1876) was built for cotton broker Edward Ellis Edwards. Sefton Court (1860s, extended 1889), 50 Ullet road, is an Italianate mansion, extended for shipping magnet Dashper Edward Glynn; the interior was remodelled c.1901 in the Arts and Crafts style by Edmund Rathbone with the woodwork, metalwork and painting by Bromsgrove Guild of Applied Arts. The three stuccoed Italianate houses 38, 40 and 42 Ullet Road were built in the 1860s for merchants from Greece. Holt House (1874–78), Ullet Road, was built in an austere style for the cotton merchant Robert Durning Holt, who was Lord Mayor of Liverpool in 1893. Mossley Hill Drive on the eastern edge of Sefton Park was developed in the 1880s with a series of redbrick and terracotta villas. No 1 Gledhill is by James Francis Doyle for stockbroker R.W. Elliston, No 2 was built for cotton broker A.S. Hannay probably by H. & A.P. Fry, No 6 Duffus probably designed by F & G Holme. Round the corner in Ibbotsons Lane is the bridge perhaps also by Doyle. Mary Clark Home (1892), 93 Ullet Road, by Arthur P. Fry, was designed as accommodation for elderly single ladies.

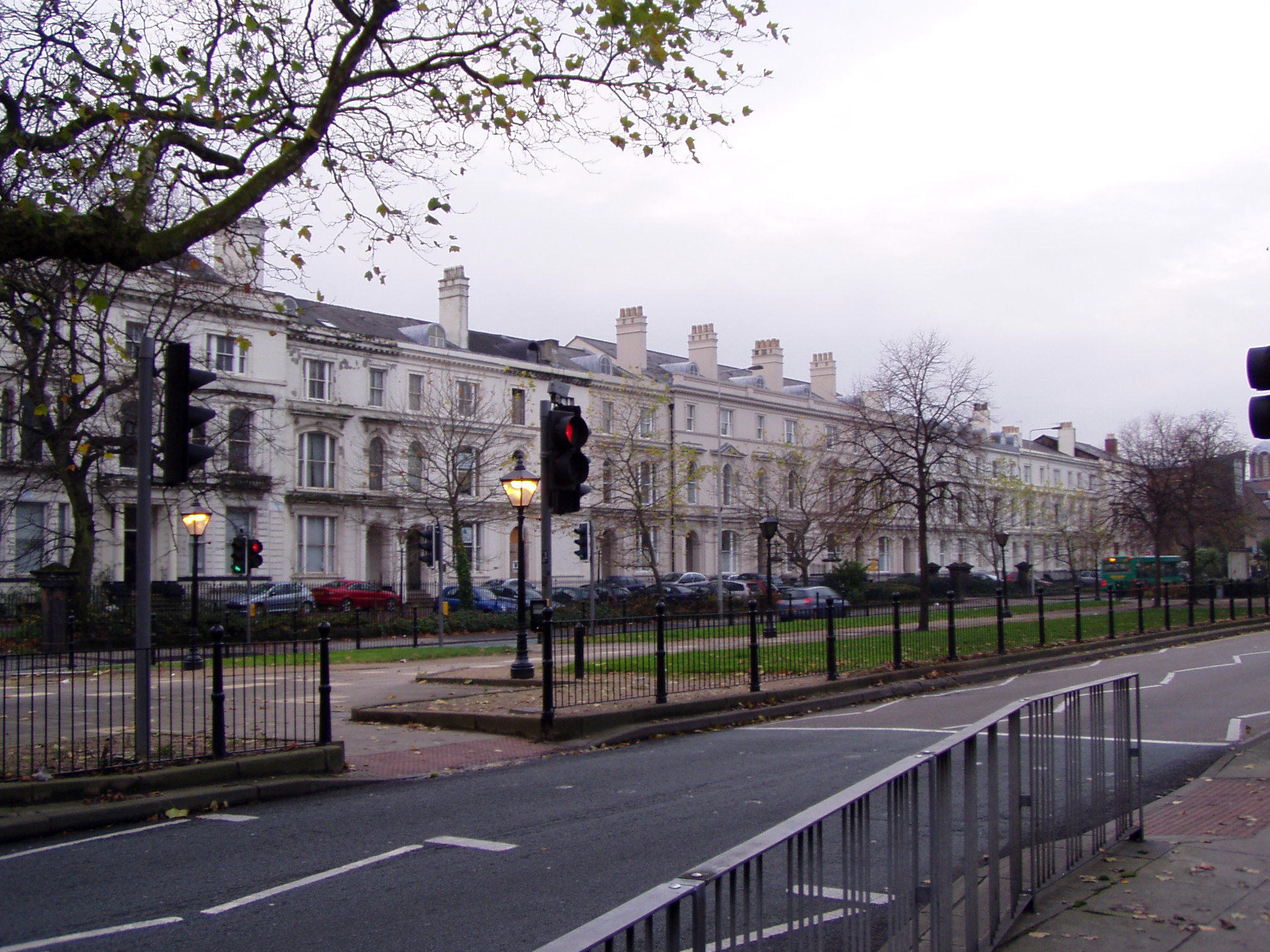
Princes Road
(1840s; unlisted)

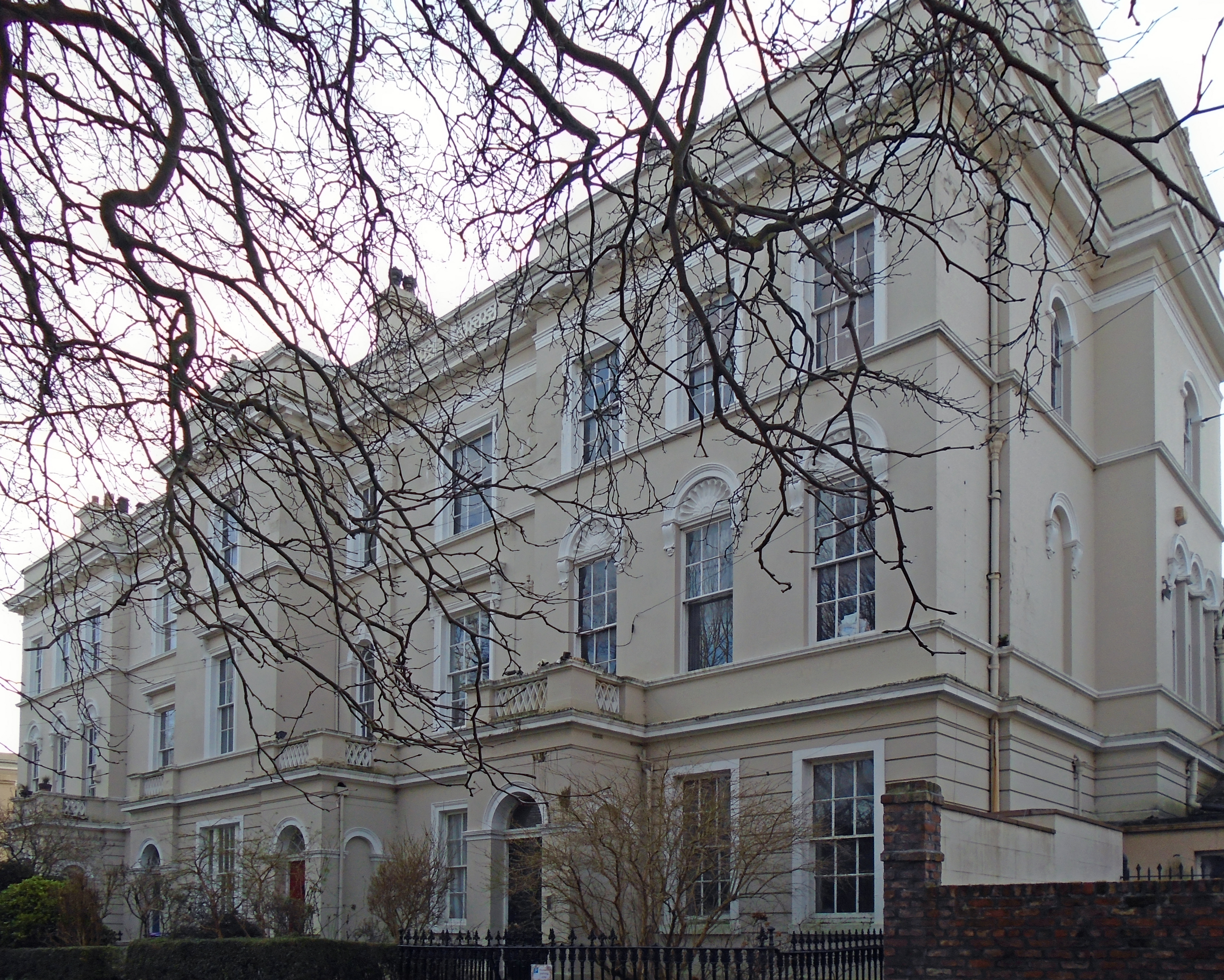
Windermere Terrace, Prince's Park
(1840s; Grade II)

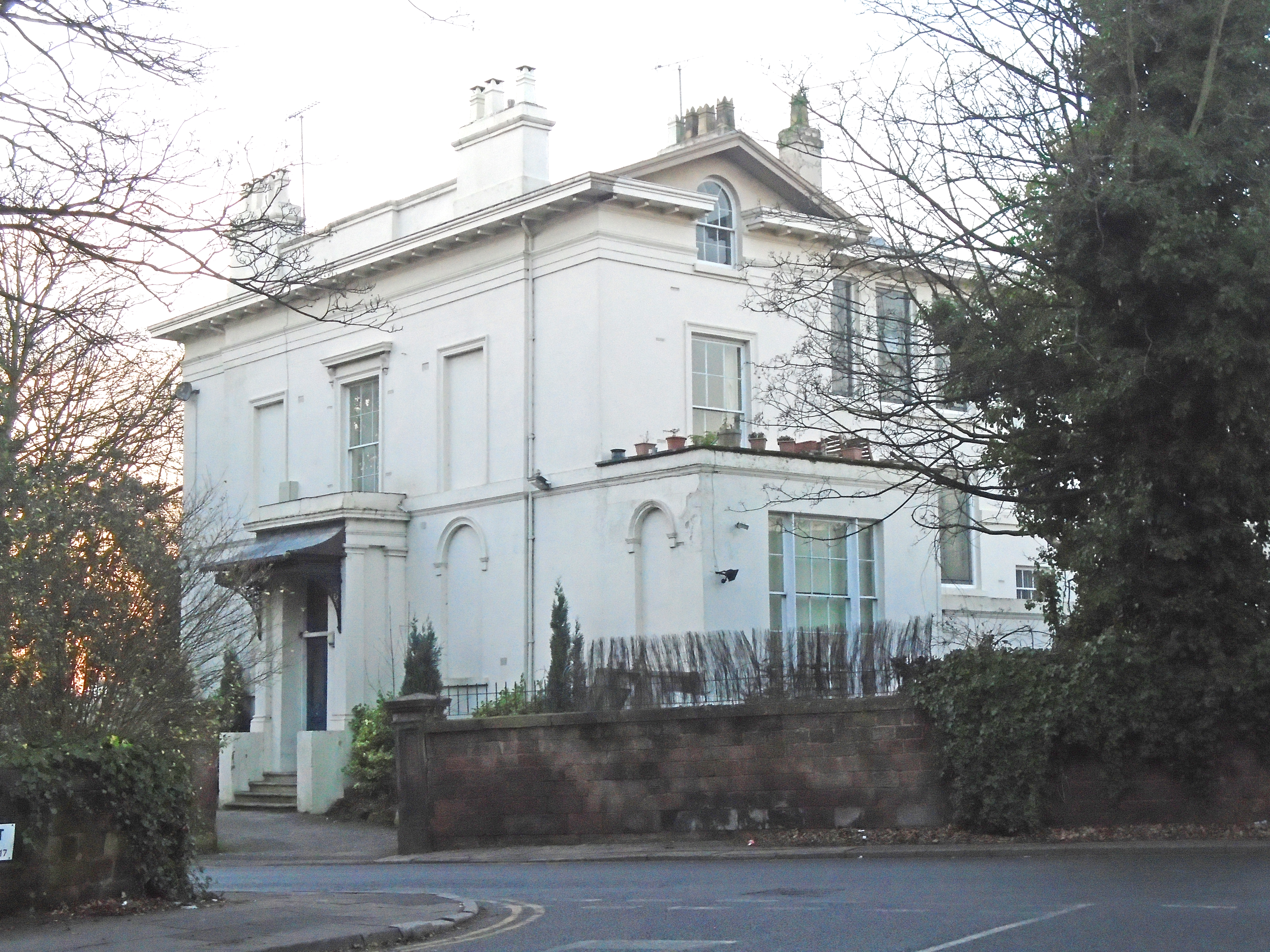
Parkside, Ullet Road
(1840s; Grade II)

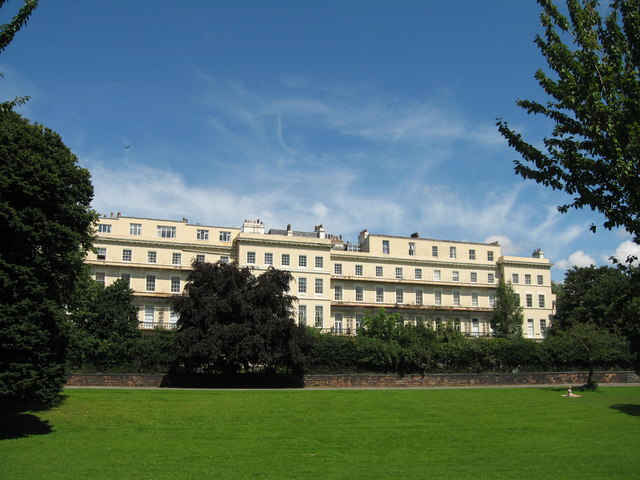
Prince's Park Mansions
(1843; Grade II)

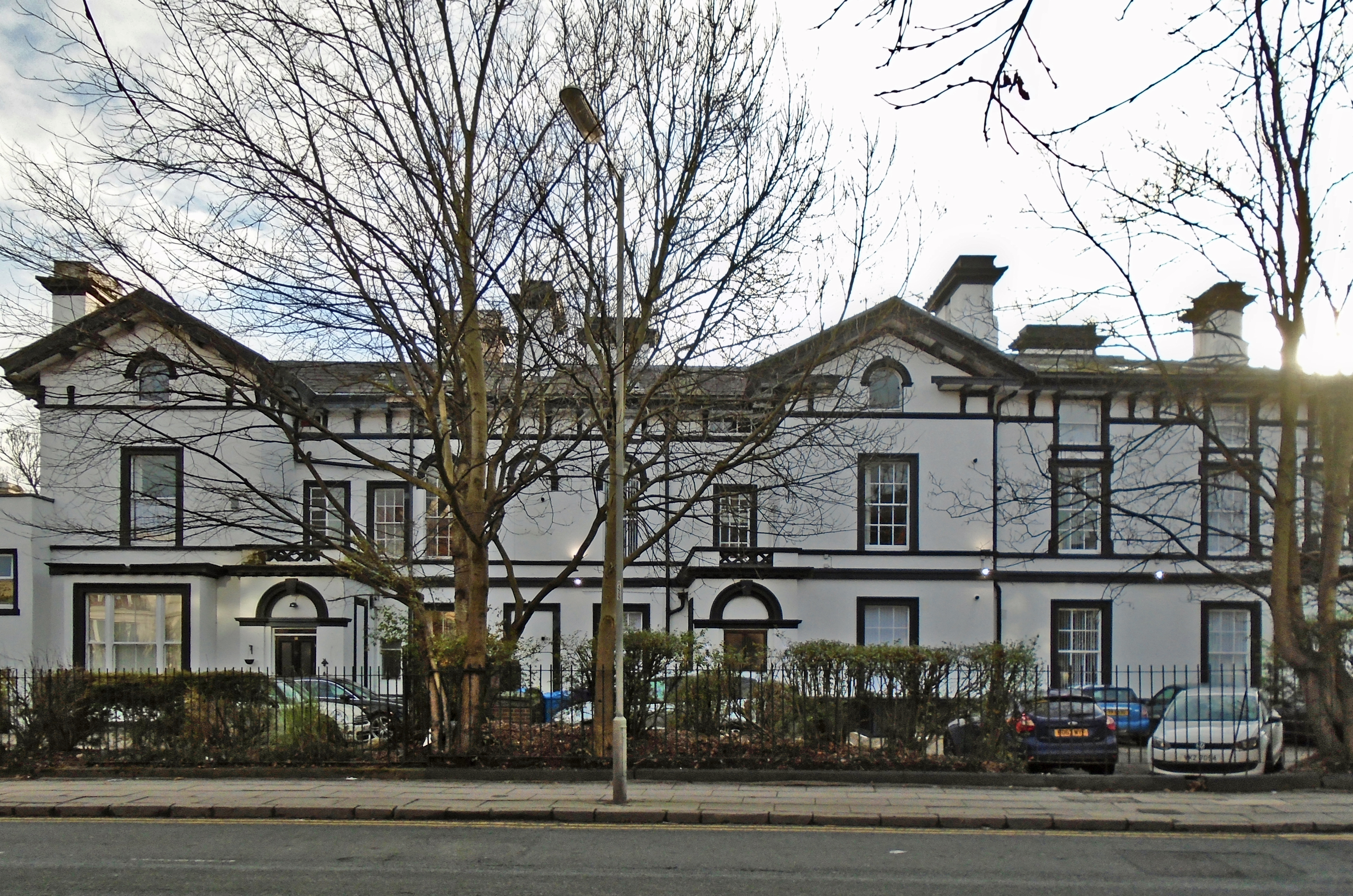
16-18 Croxteth Road
(c.1845; Grade II)

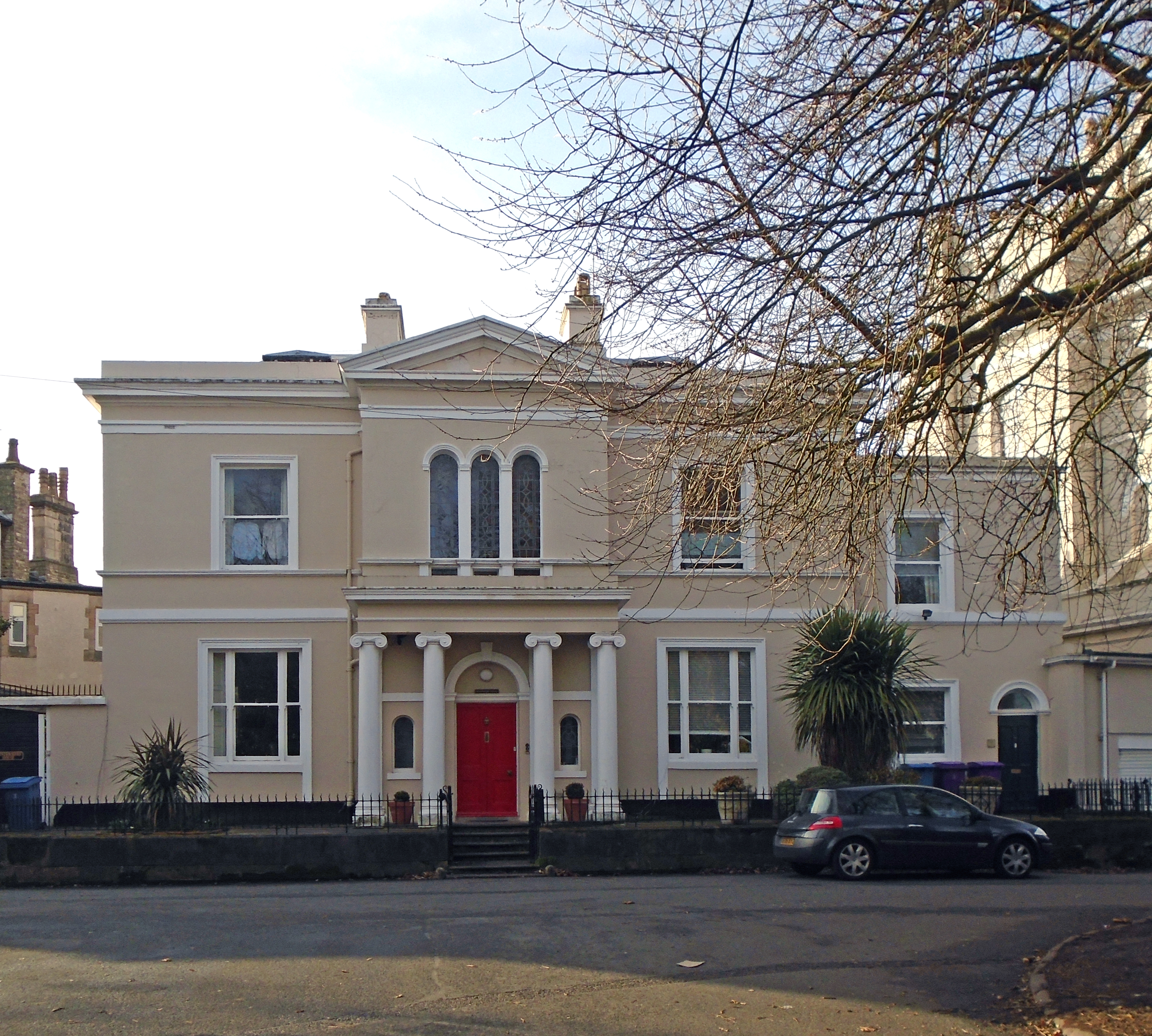
Windermere House, Prince's Park
(1850s; Grade II)

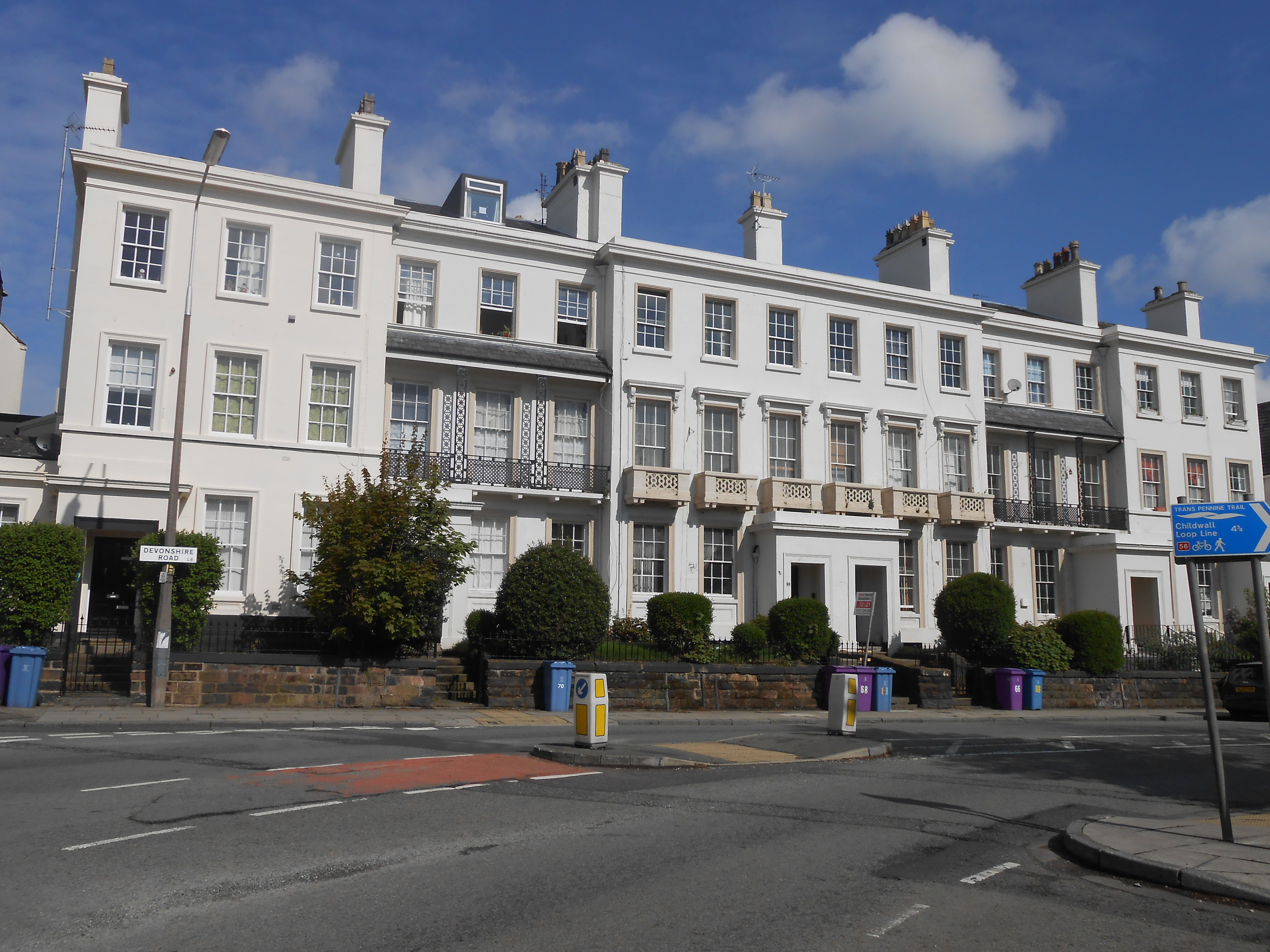
62-72, Devonshire Road
(1850s; Grade II)

== Edwardian and World War I (1901–1918) ==
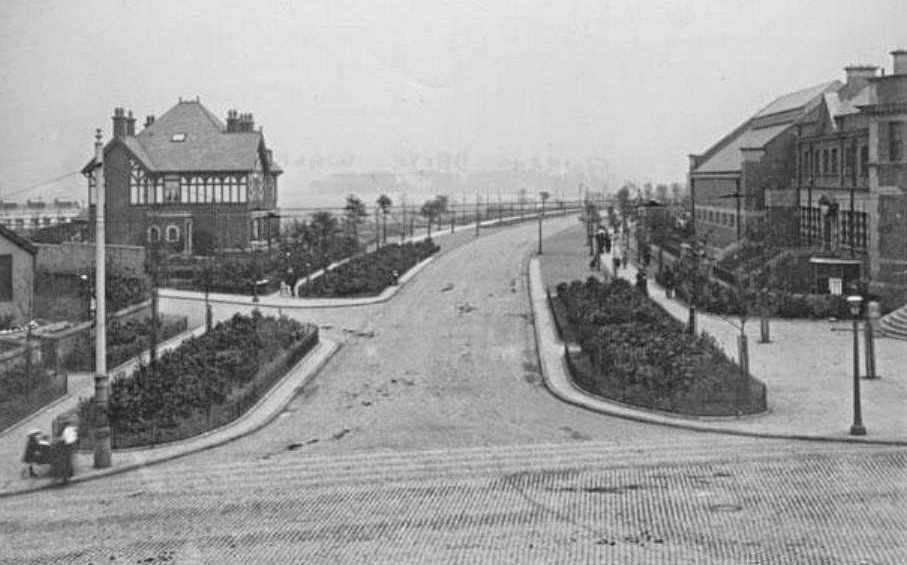
Queen's Drive, Walton 1909

The docks saw the increase in traffic in goods from 12.4 million tons in 1900 to over 19 million tons by 1914. This era would see under the supervision of the borough engineer John Alexander Brodie the start of the construction Queens Drive, of what is now the A5058 road, the first Ring road in Britain, the first section was started in Walton in 1904 and completed in 1909.

=== Edwardian office & commercial buildings ===
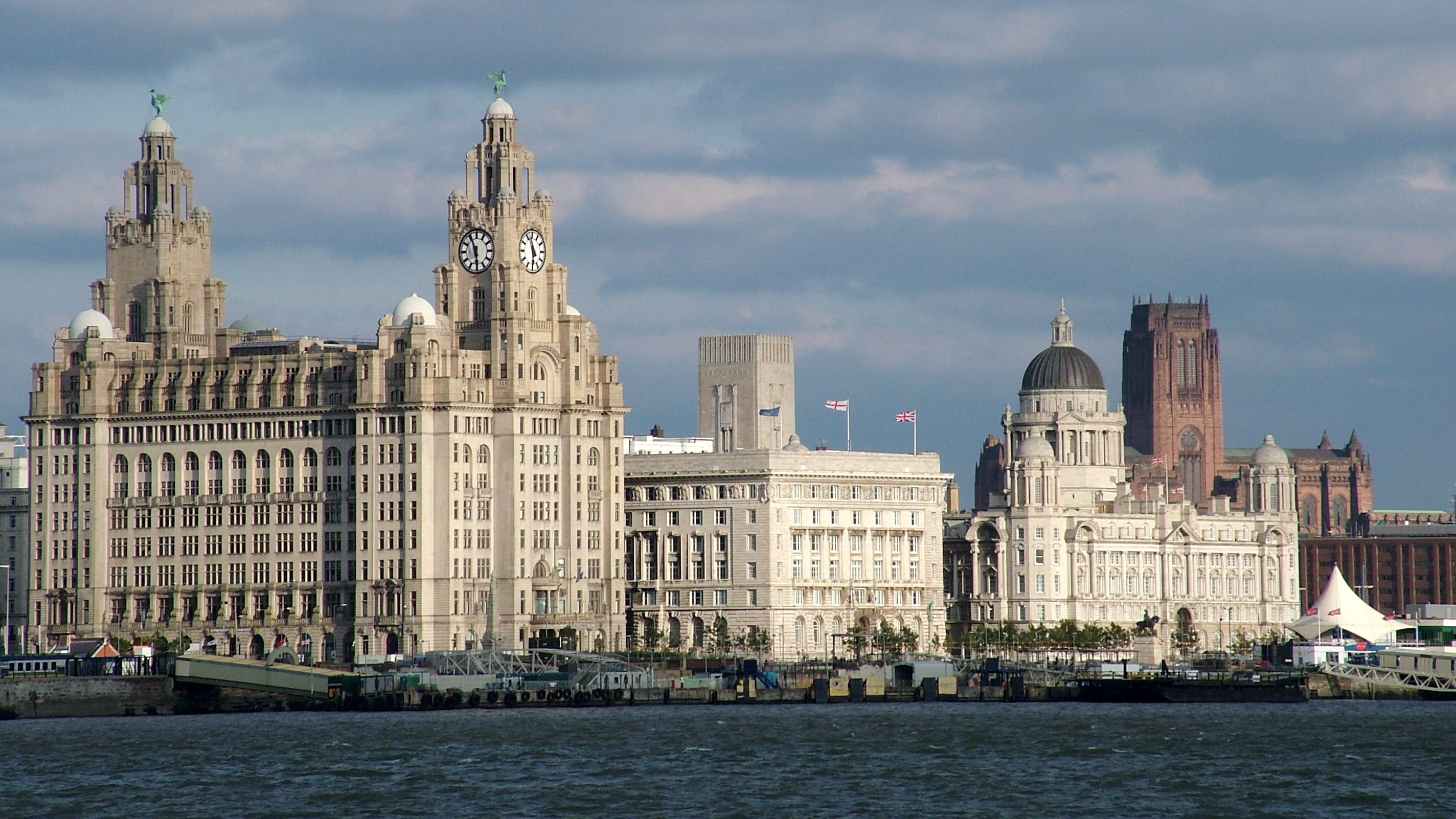
Pier Head with the Royal Liver Building, Cunard Building (with Queensway Tunnel Ventilation Tower behind) and the Port of Liverpool Building. Liverpool Cathedral in the background

The sale of the former George's Dock in 1902 provided the basis for the development of Pier Head. The ensemble of three administrative buildings eventually erected there, today constitute Liverpool's best-recognised vista. Much later (sometime around 2000) dubbed the Three Graces they are from north to south:

- Royal Liver Building (1908–11) designed by Walter Aubrey Thomas as the headquarters of the insurance company Royal Liver Assurance, surmounted by two bronze domes with a Liver bird (the symbol of Liverpool) on each.
- Cunard Building (1914–17) designed by William Edward Willink and Philip Coldwell Thicknesse, the former headquarters of the Cunard shipping company, it is an example of Palazzo style architecture.
- Port of Liverpool Building (1903–07) designed by Sir Arnold Thornely, F.B. Hobbs, Briggs and Wolstenholme, the home of the former Mersey Docks and Harbour Board which regulated the city's docks. The style of the building is Baroque Revival. Another building of this style is the former branch of the Bank of Liverpool Prescot Street (1904), by James F. Doyle.

In front of these buildings at the water's edge are the memorials to the men of the Merchant Navy who sailed out of the port during both world wars. Memorials to the British mariners, Norwegian, Dutch and to the Chinese seamen who manned Britain's ships cluster together here.

Henry Shelmerdine designed the Produce Exchange Building (1902) in Victoria Street. Orleans House is a warehouse by Huon Arthur Matear and Frank Worthington Simon. An unusual use of Gothic for office buildings in the Edwardian period, is the former State Insurance Building, Dale Street by Walter Aubrey Thomas.

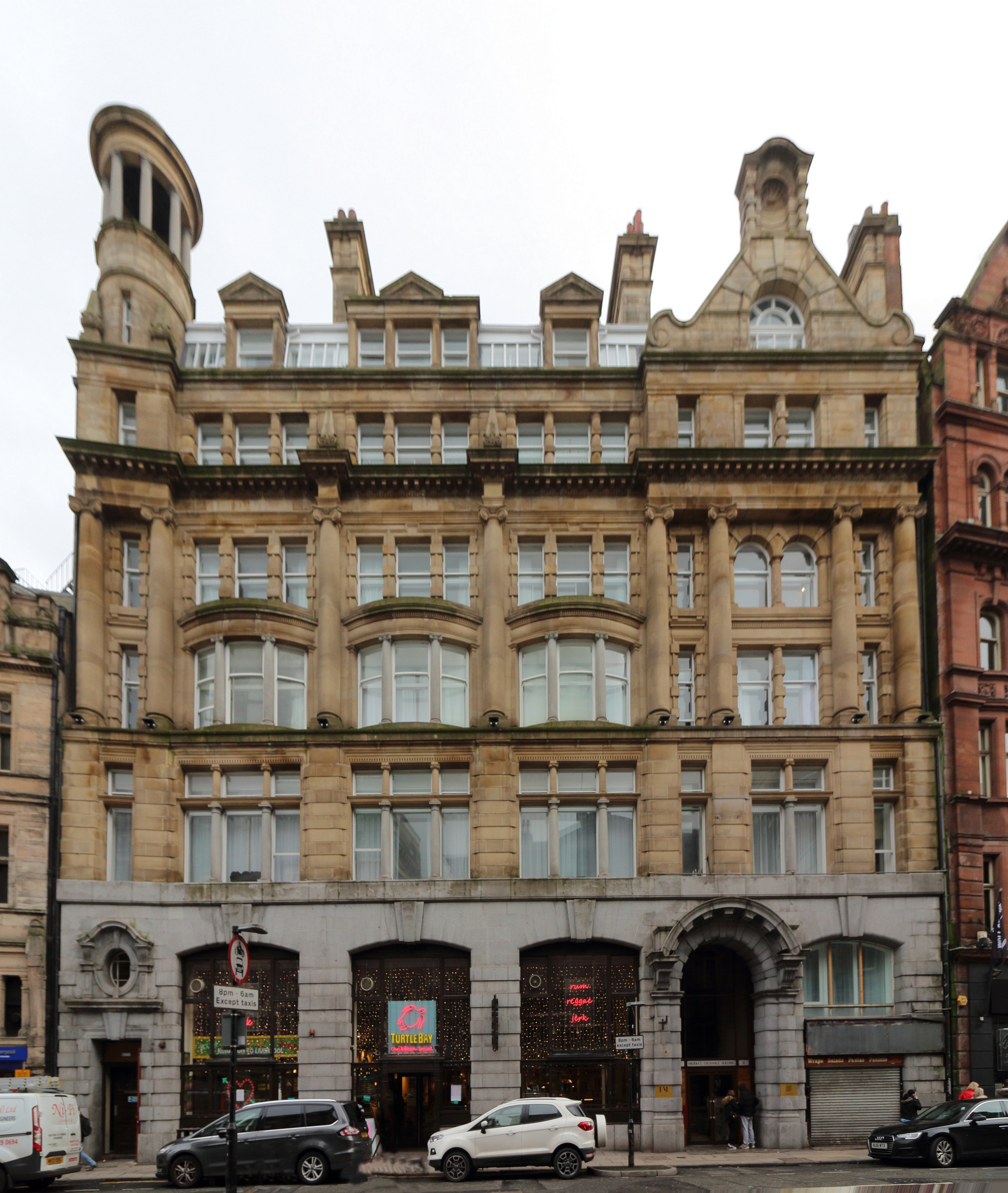
Produce Exchange Buildings, Victoria Street
(1902; Grade II)

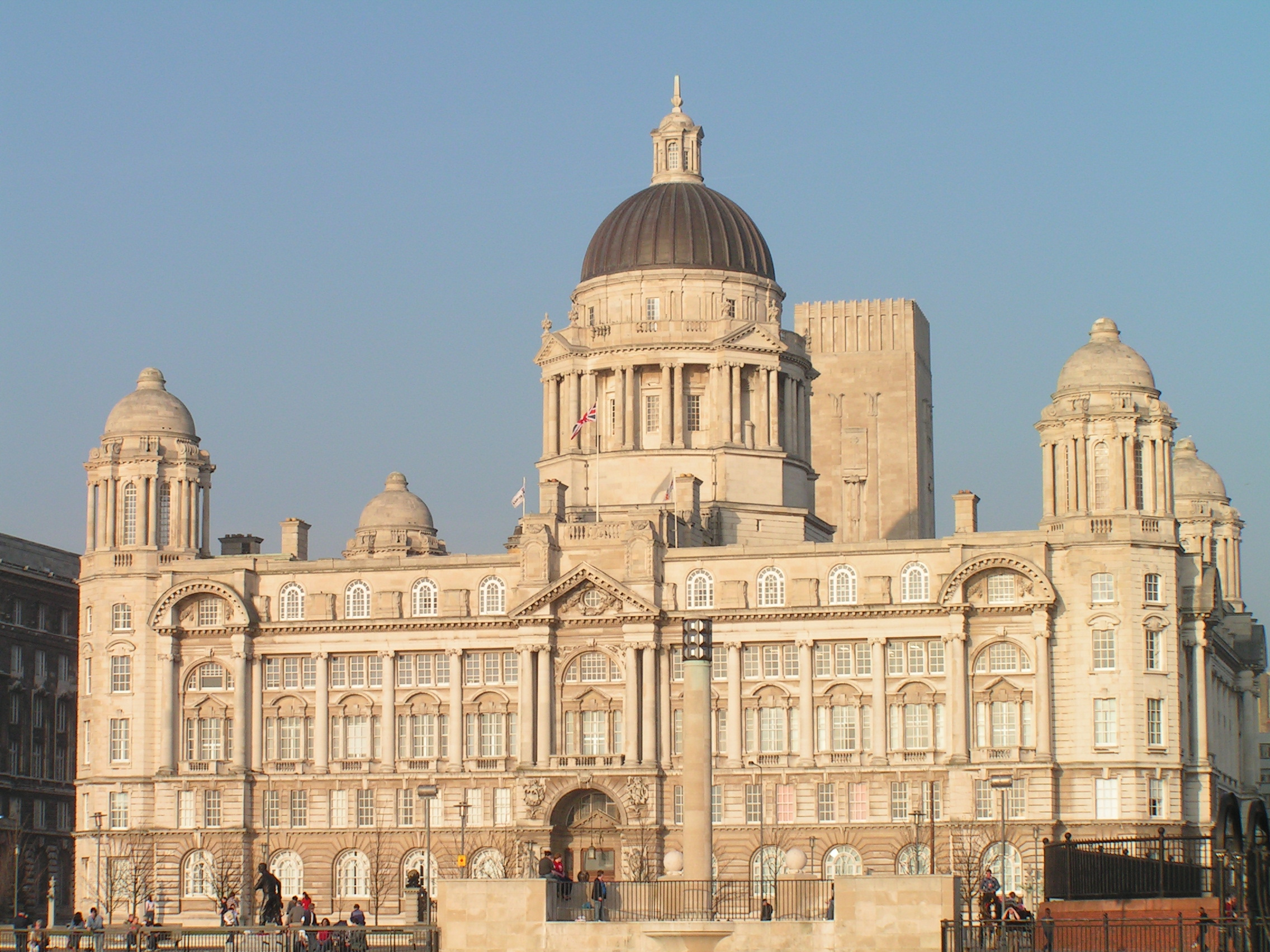
Port of Liverpool Building
(1903–07; Grade II*)

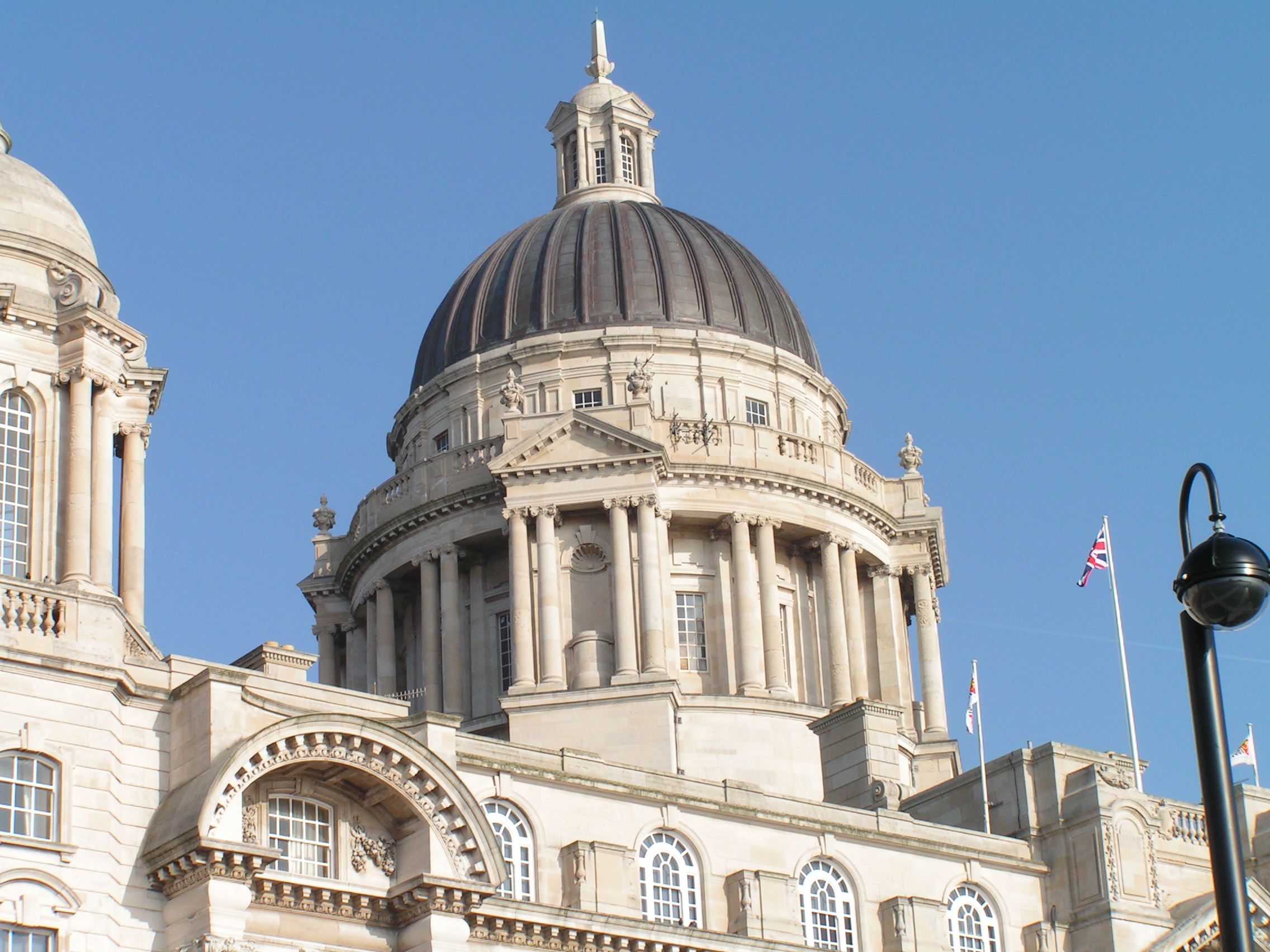
The Dome of Port of Liverpool Building
(1903–07; Grade II*)

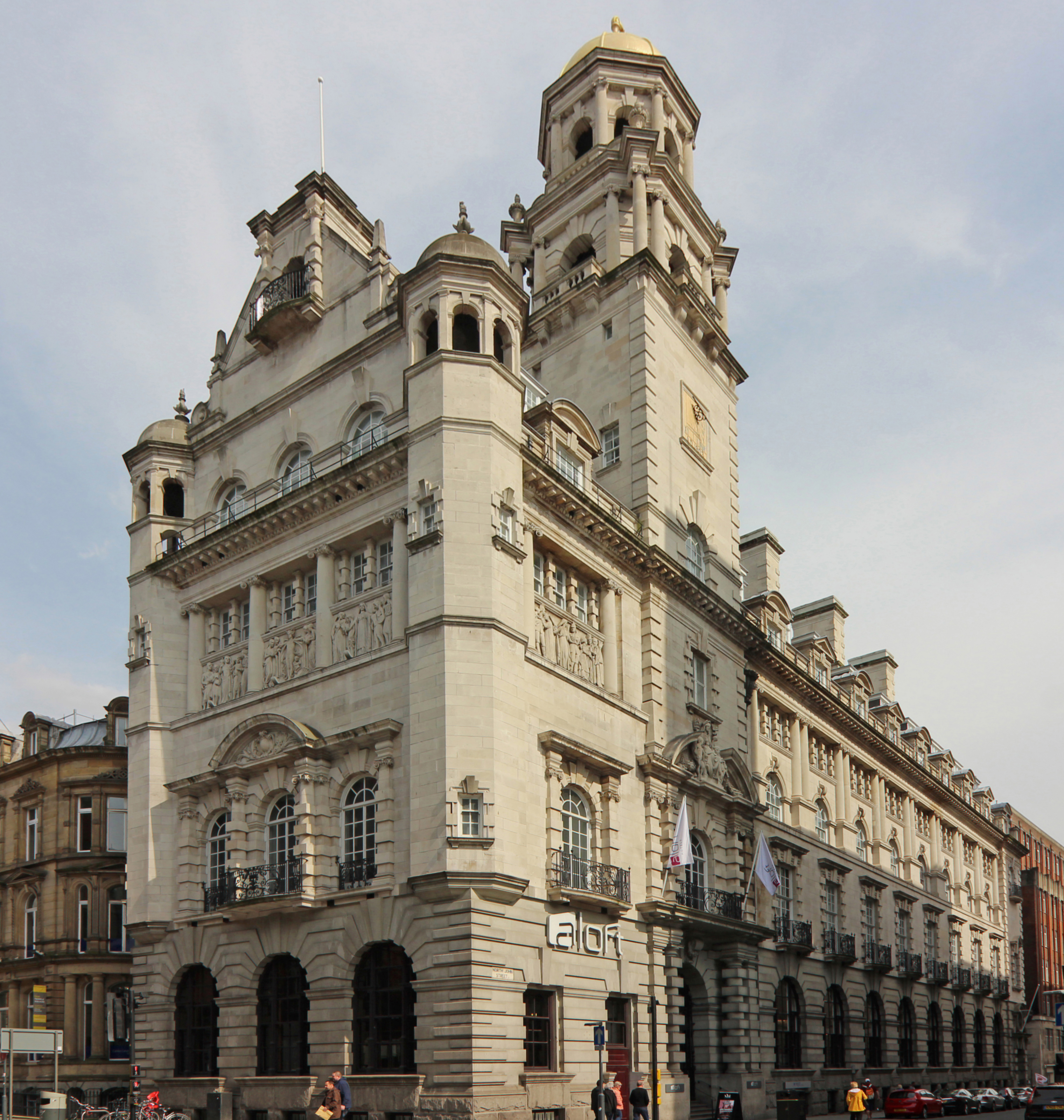
Royal Insurance Building, Dale Street
(1903; Grade II*)
Identified as the first steel-framed building in the UK

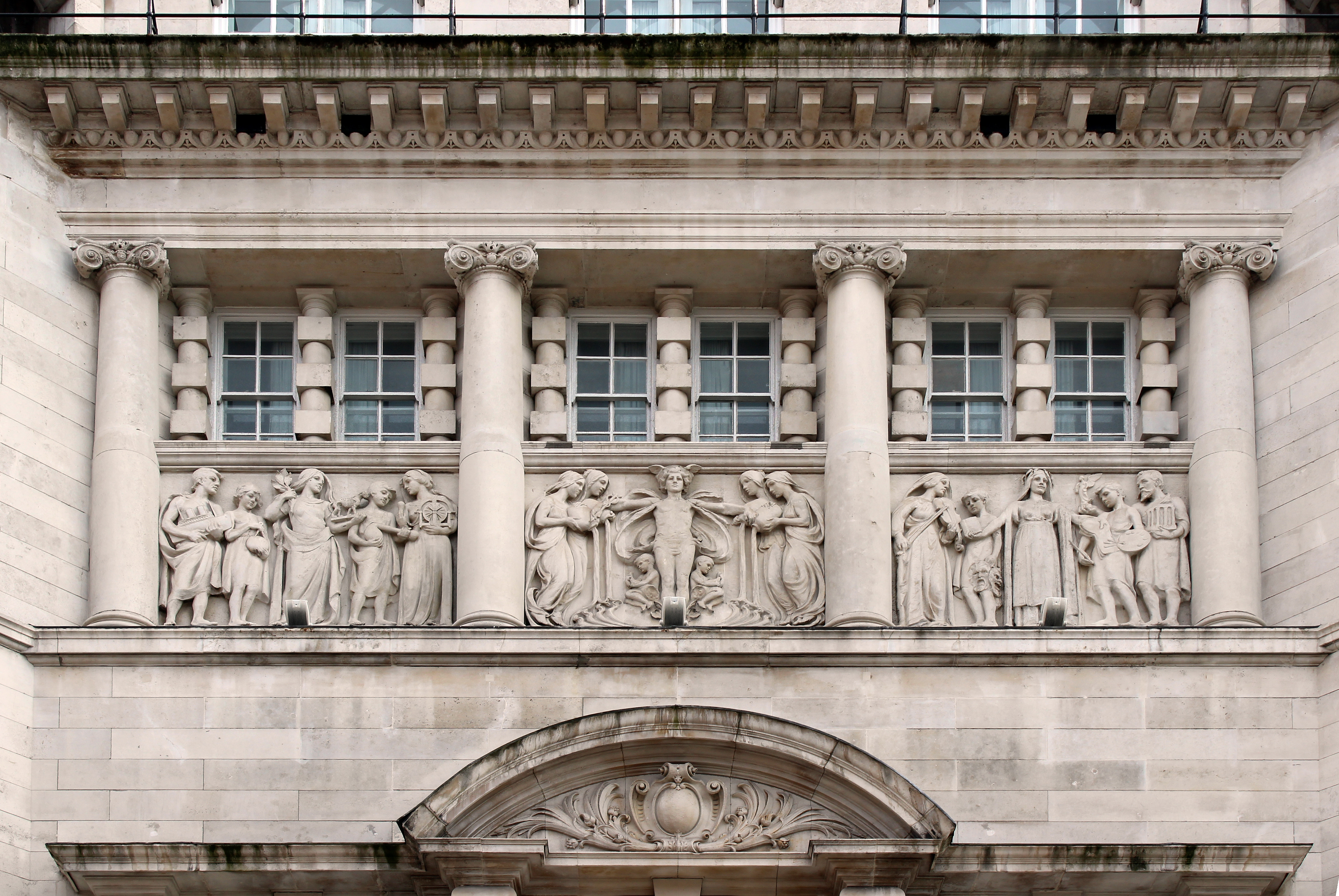
Carved frieze on the theme of insurance, Royal Insurance Building, Dale Street, by C.J. Allen
(1903; Grade II*)

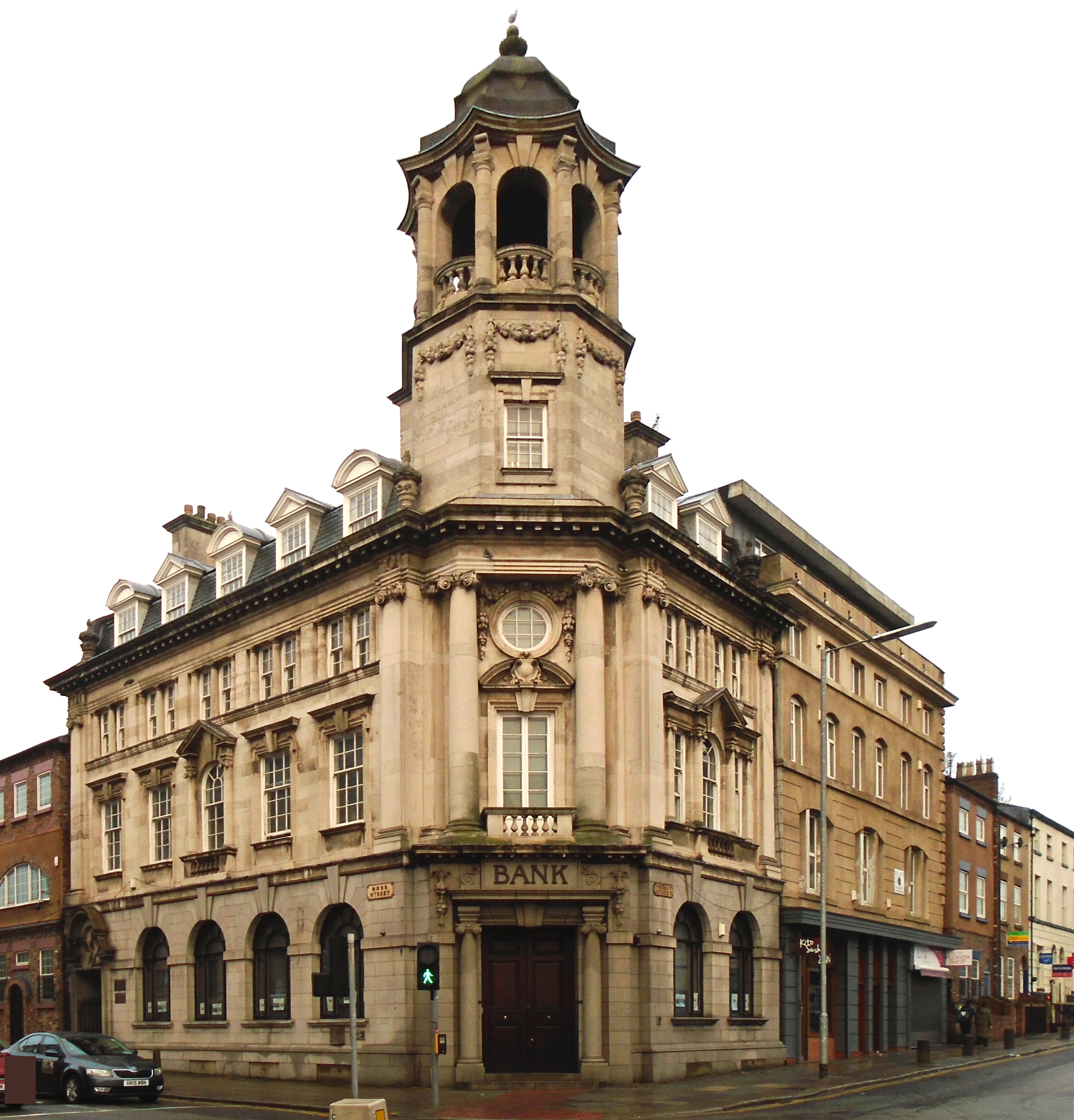
Former branch of Bank of Liverpool, Prescot Street
(1904; Grade II)

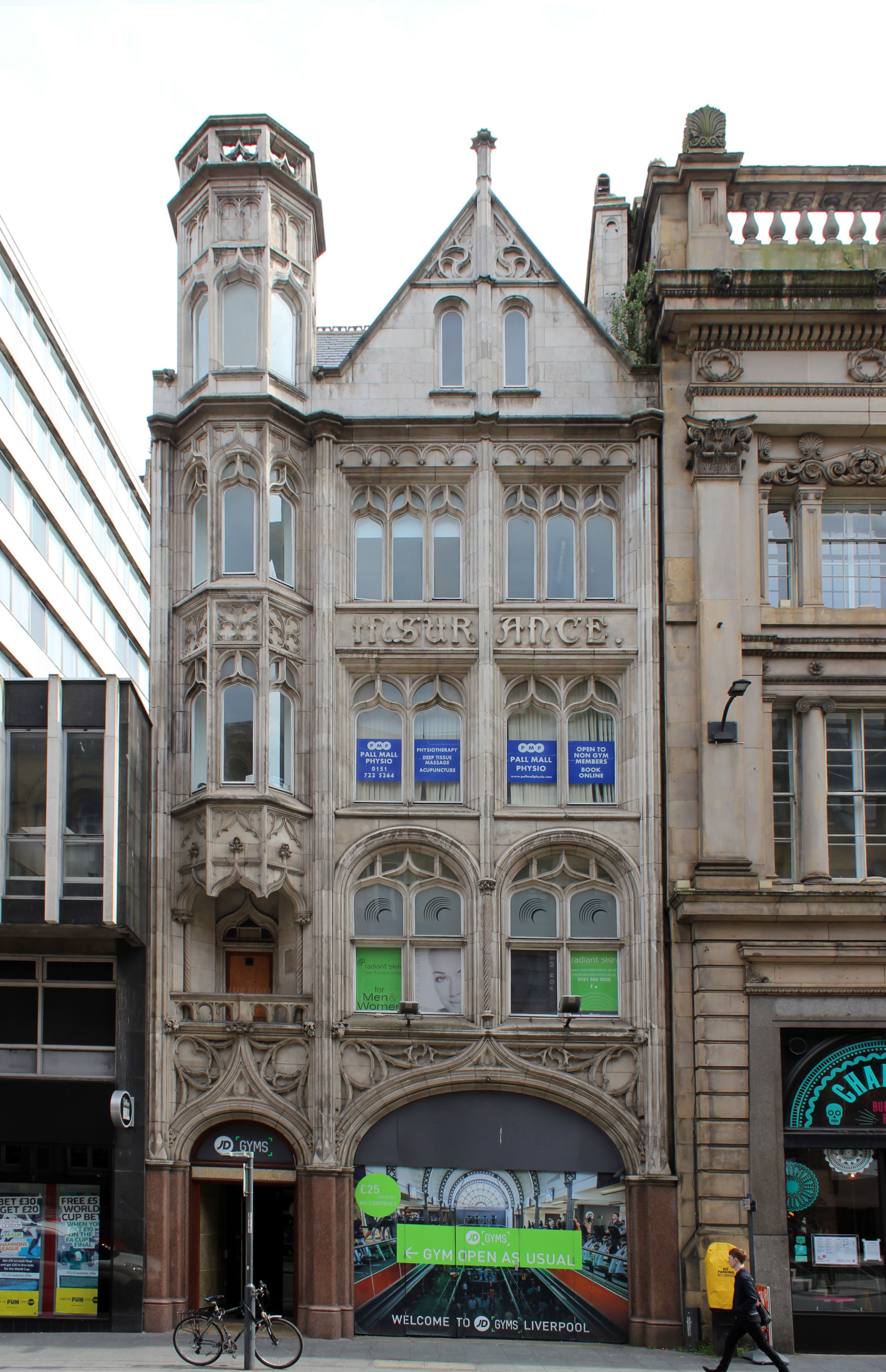
Former State Insurance Building, 14 Dale Street
(1906; Grade II)

=== Edwardian retail, sporting and entertainment buildings ===
On Renshaw Street there is the new alternative shopping centre Grand Central Hall which has not only fine external architecture but also has much to offer inside, such as the metalwork and ceiling decoration of the ground floor and the fantastic domed ceiling of Roscoe Hall. It was originally built in 1905, under the guidance of the Methodist Church, as a 2,000-seat cinema. The original organ of Roscoe Hall still remains and is a listed item itself, although recent shop additions to the hall have obscured the view somewhat. Frank Matcham, designed Liverpool Olympia in 1905. The Vines public house on Lime Street is the grandest of the era, built 1907, in exuberant Edwardian baroque style, to designs by Walter W. Thomas for brewer Robert Cain. A surviving department store of the era, built for Owen Owen, London Road Everton designed almost certainly by Walter W. Thomas. Hanover House (1913–15), 85 Hanover Street is a row of shops with the former Neptune Theatre above, by Walter Aubrey Thomas.

Designed by Liverpool born R. Frank Atkinson, The Adelphi Hotel on Ranelagh Street is the most famous hotel in Liverpool and was very popular in the days when luxury liners crossed the Atlantic when it was described as the great Cunard liner stuck in the middle of the city. Liverpool was Charles Dickens' favourite city after London, and the Adelphi (the previous building with this name) his favourite hotel in the world. A "fly-on-the-wall" TV documentary series was made on it and its staff.

Thomas Shelmerdine and engineer W.R. Court designed Picton Bathe (1904–06) in Wavertree; the design is an amalgam of 17th-century motifs and arts and crafts. It was in this era that Archibald Leitch designed the two great football stadiums Anfield 1906–07, capacity 60,000 and Goodison Park 1908–1938, this became the first British football ground to have seating as well as standing on all four sides.

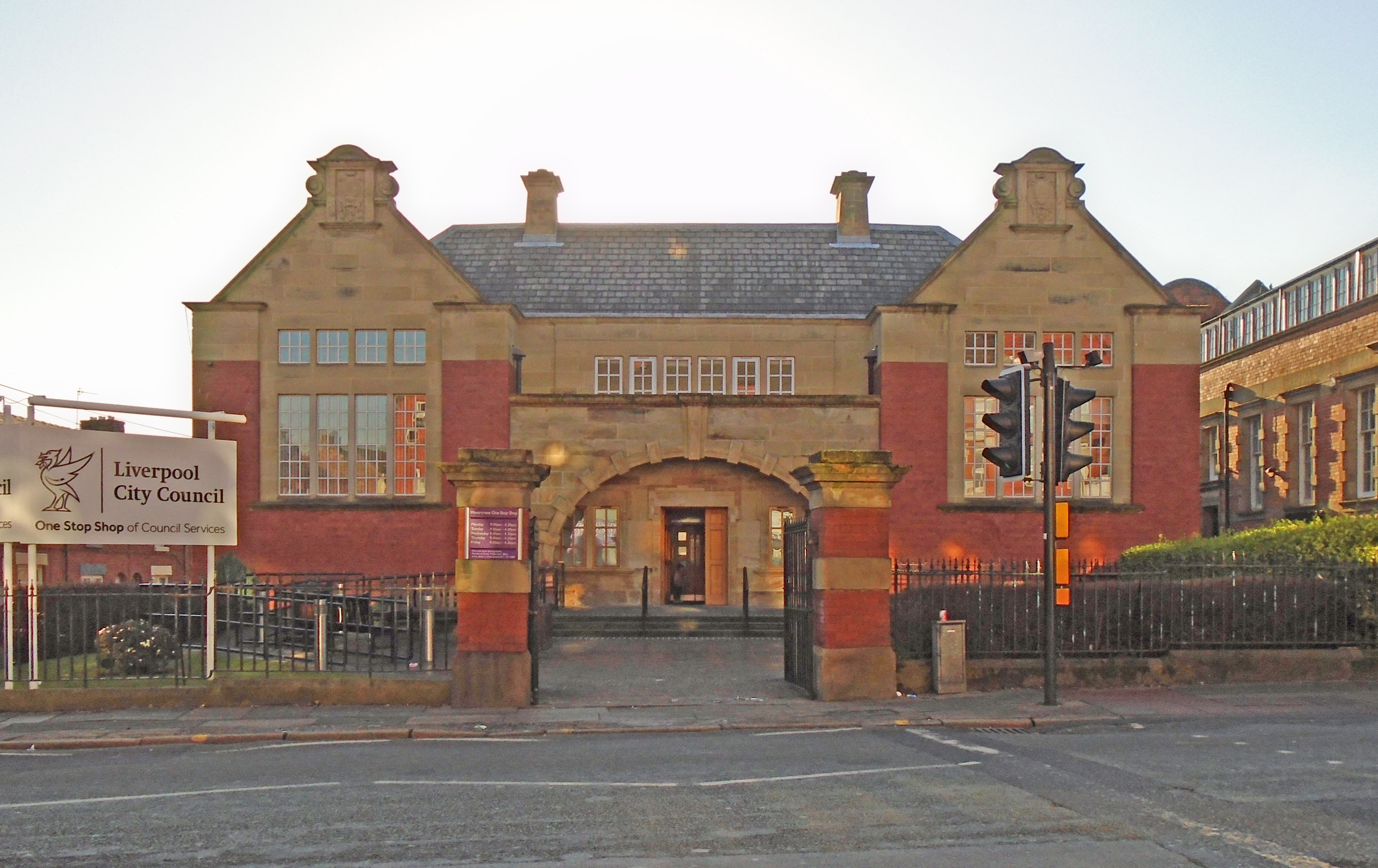
Picton Baths, Picton Road, Wavertree
(1904–06; Grade II)

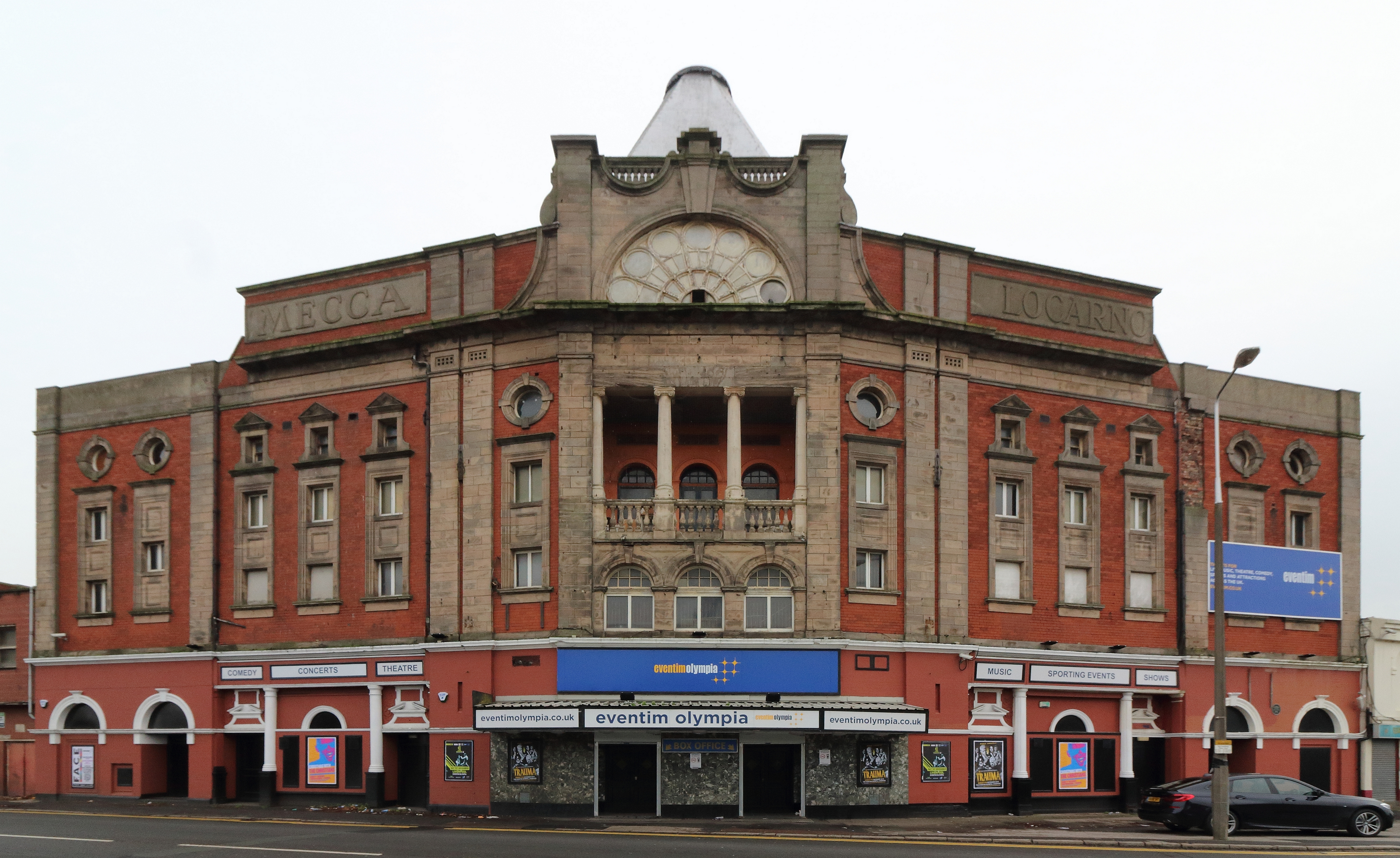
Olympia Theatre, West Derby Road
(1905; Grade II*)

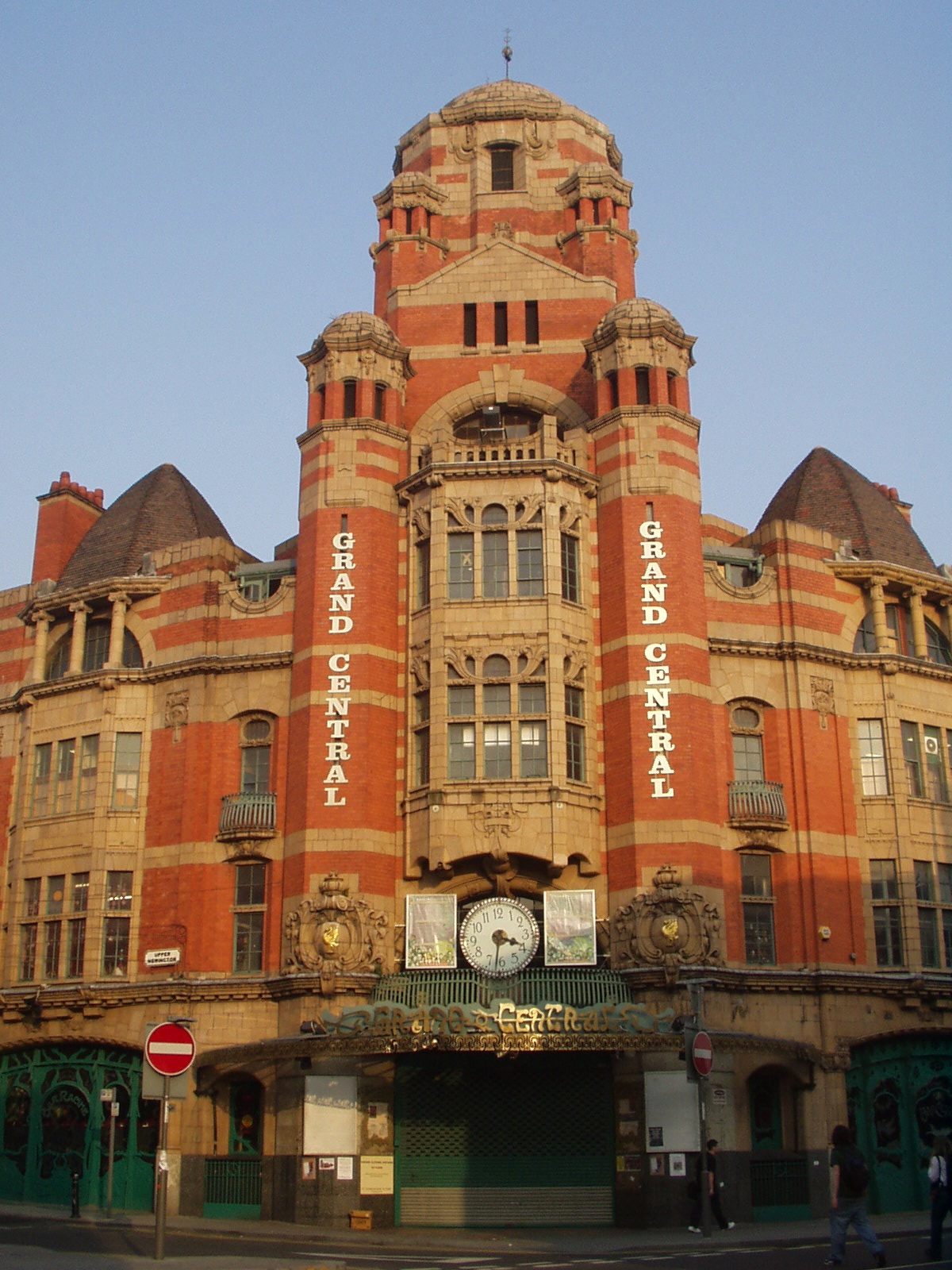
Grand Central Hall, 35 Renshaw Street
(1905; Grade II)

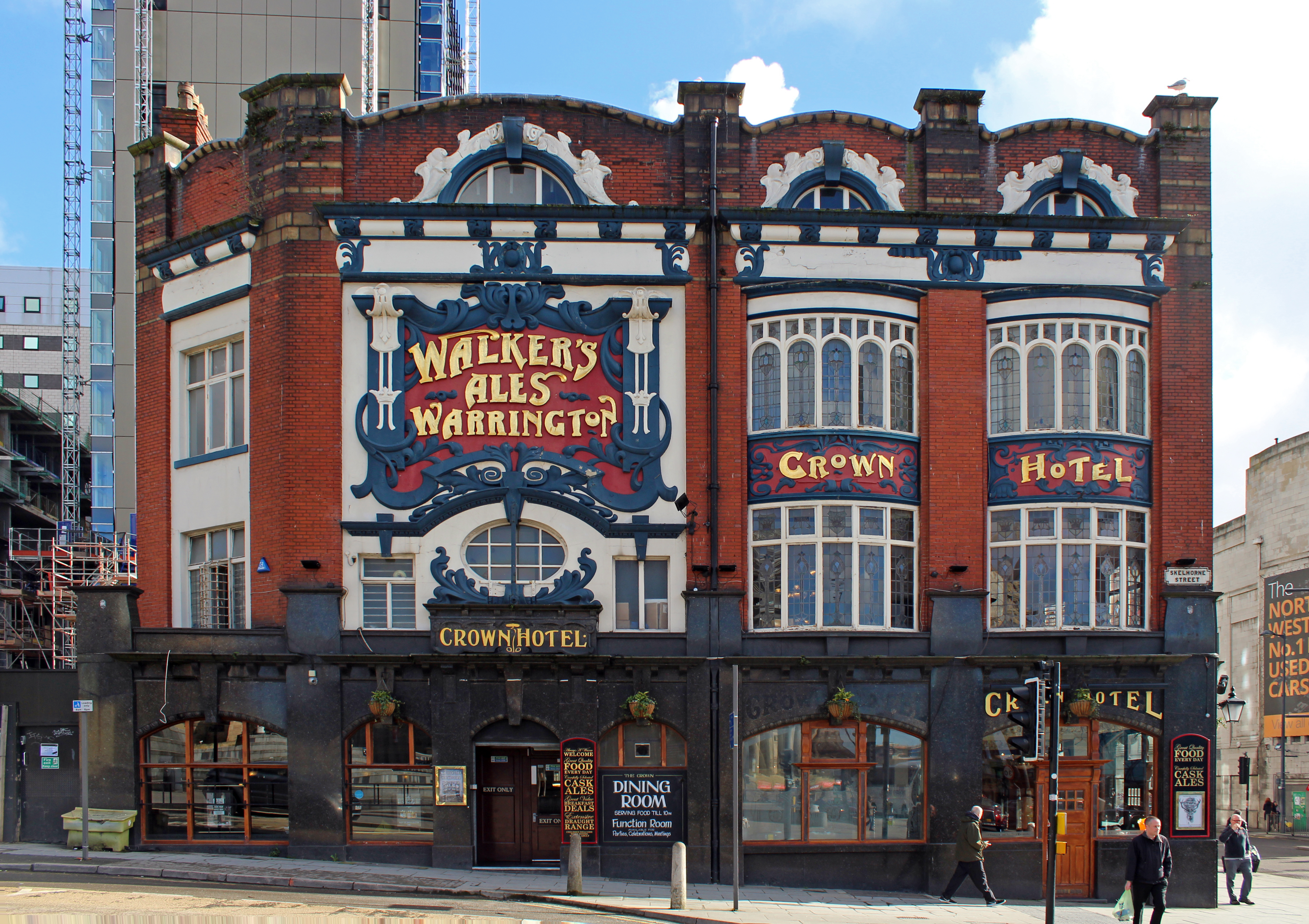
Crown Hotel, Skelhorne Street
(1905; Grade II)

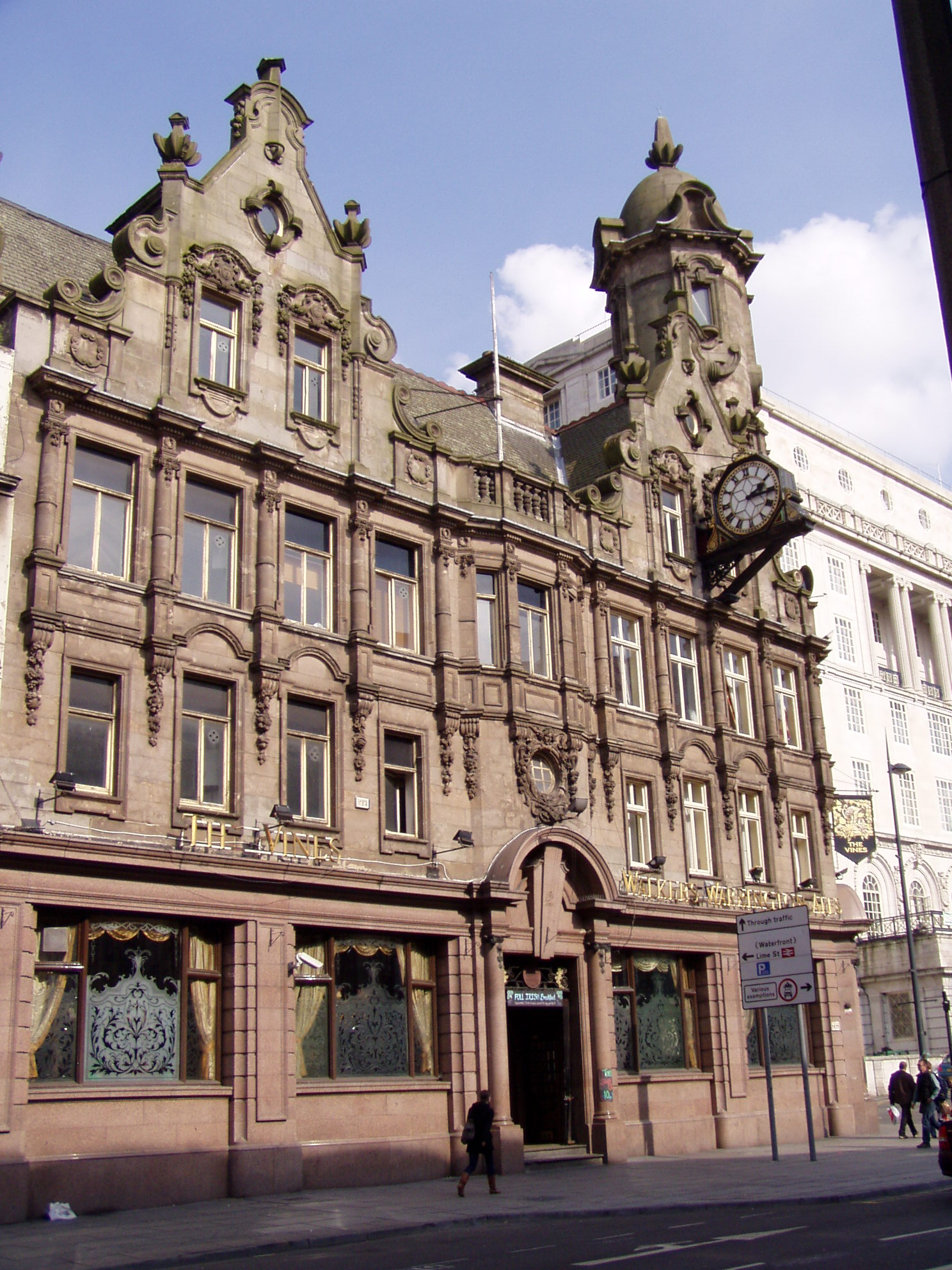
The Vines public house, 81 Lime Street
(1907; Grade II*)

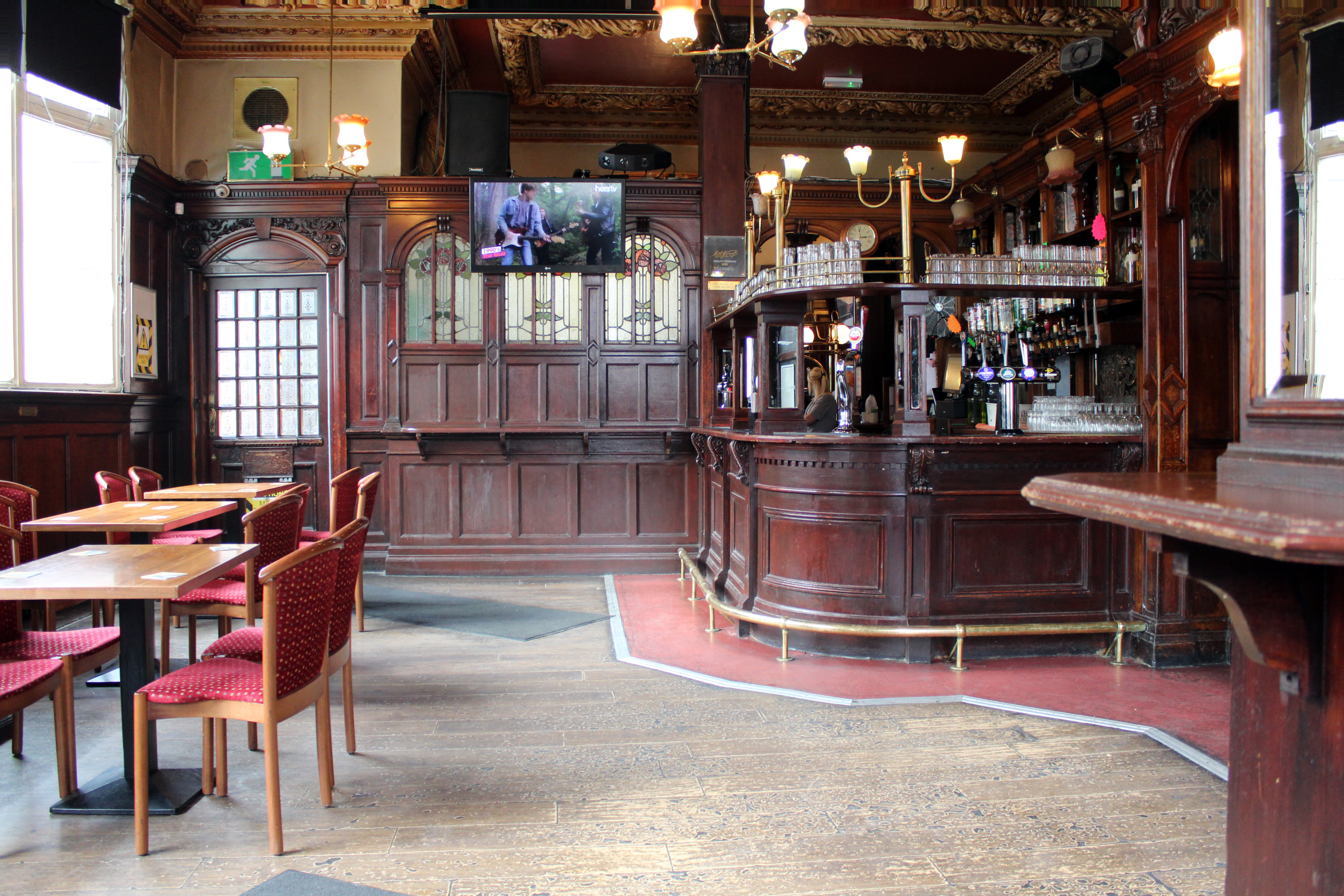
Lounge Bar, The Vines public house, 81 Lime Street
(1907; Grade II*)

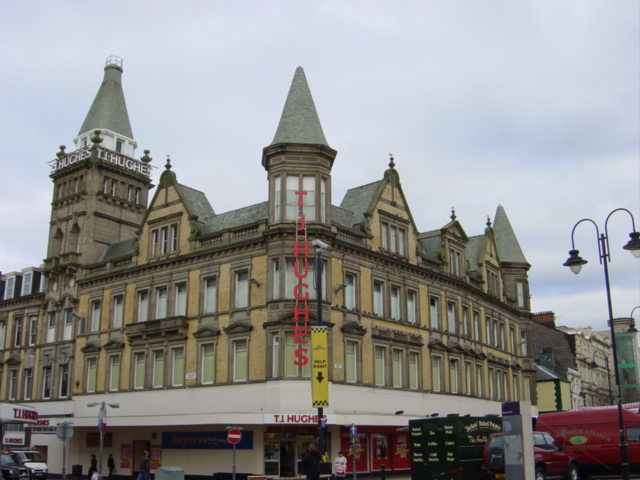
Former Owen Owen department store, London Road, Everton
(c.1910; unlisted)

=== Edwardian public buildings and infrastructure ===
The Queen Victoria Monument (1902–06) in Derby Square was designed by F. M. Simpson then Roscoe Professor at the School of Architecture and Applied Art, Liverpool, the sculptor was C.J. Allen. A monument to Florence Nightingale was erected in 1913 at the northern end of Princes Road, designed by Willink & Thickness, sculpted by C.J. Allen.

The former Tramway Offices (1906) (Now Richmond Hotel), for Liverpool Corporation by Thomas Shelmerdine, in neo-baroque style. He also designed in the same style several branch libraries: Toxteth Library (1902) Wavetree Library; the Lister Drive Library Tuebrook, Sefton Park Library (1911) in a Tudor Revival architecture style; Garston Library (1908) in an Arts and Crafts style. Also Shelmerdine added the Hornby Library (completed 1906) to Liverpool Central Library in a grand Edwardian Baroque style. The branch library at Walton is by Briggs, Wolstenholme & Thornley, and in a neoclassical style. The former Consumption Hospital (1903–04), 70 Mount Pleasant was designed by Grayson and Ould. It was in this period that St John's Gardens opened 1904, next to St George's Hall was created, designed by Thomas Shelmerdine, the various statues and monuments within the gardens many by famous sculptors of the era and several are grade II listed.

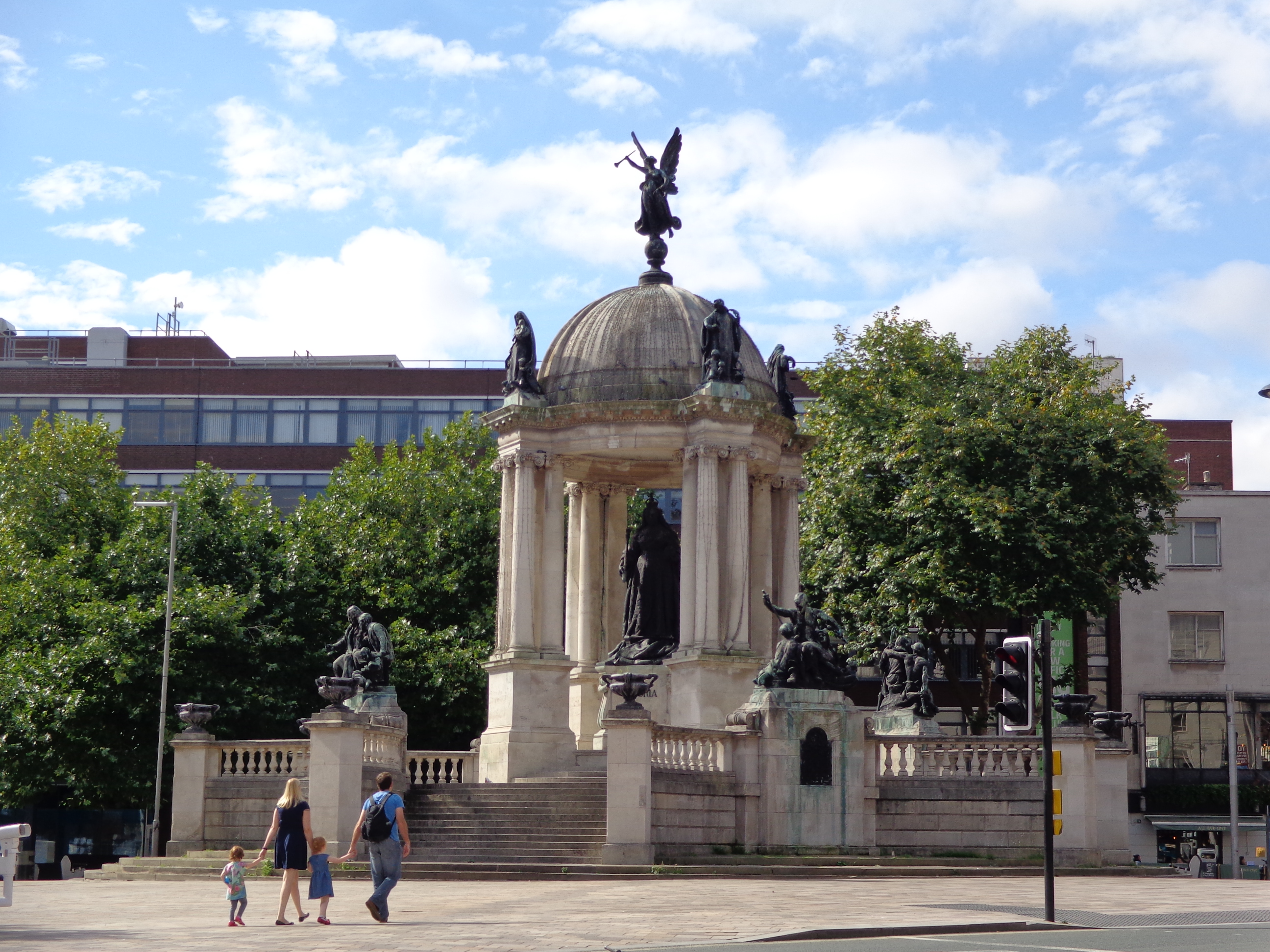
Queen Victoria Monument, Derby Square
(1902–06; Grade II)

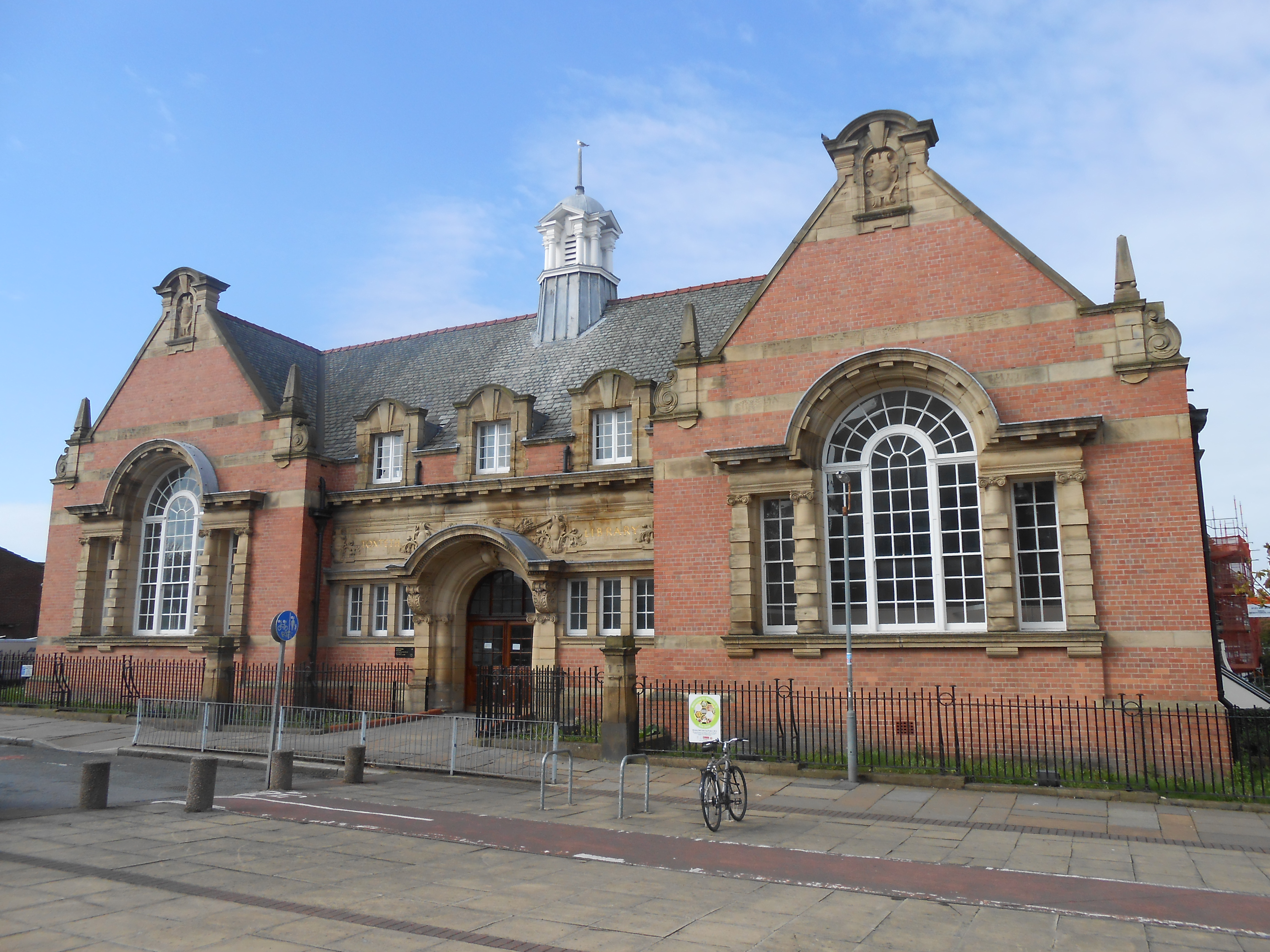
Toxteth Library, Windsor Street
(1902; Grade II)

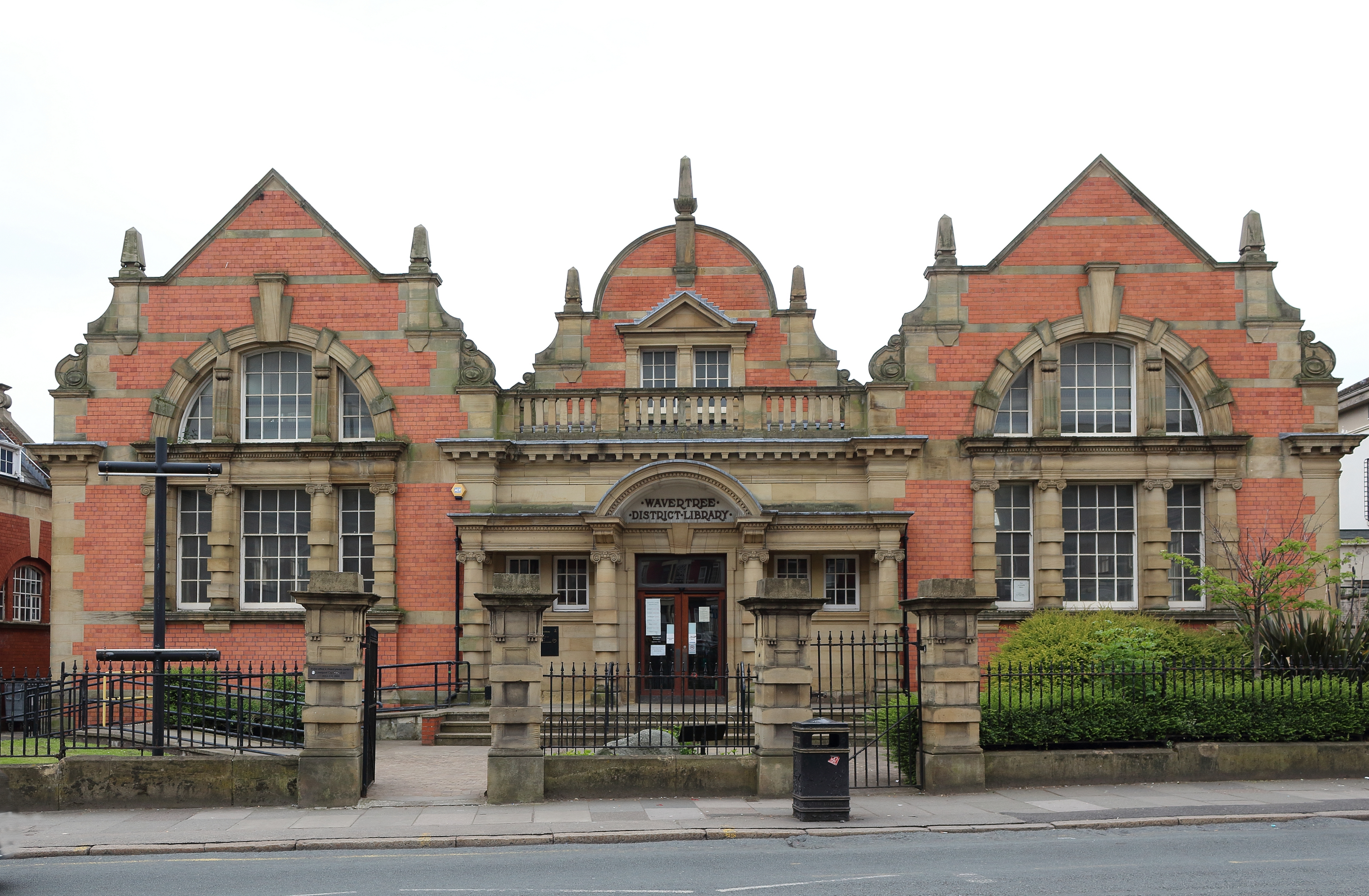
Wavertree Library, Picton Road
(1902–03; Grade II)

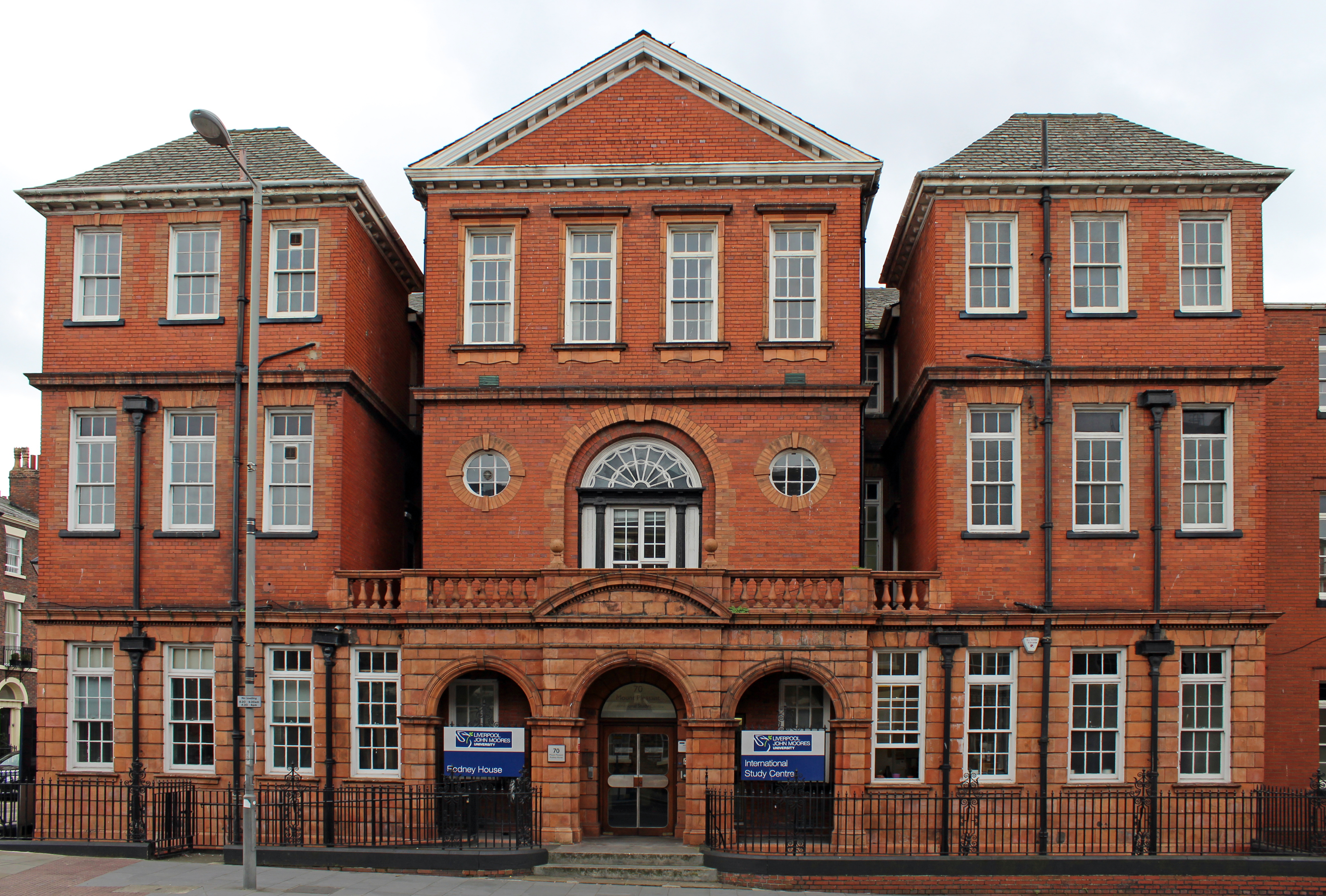
Former Consumption Hospital, 70 Mount Pleasant
(1903–04; unlisted)

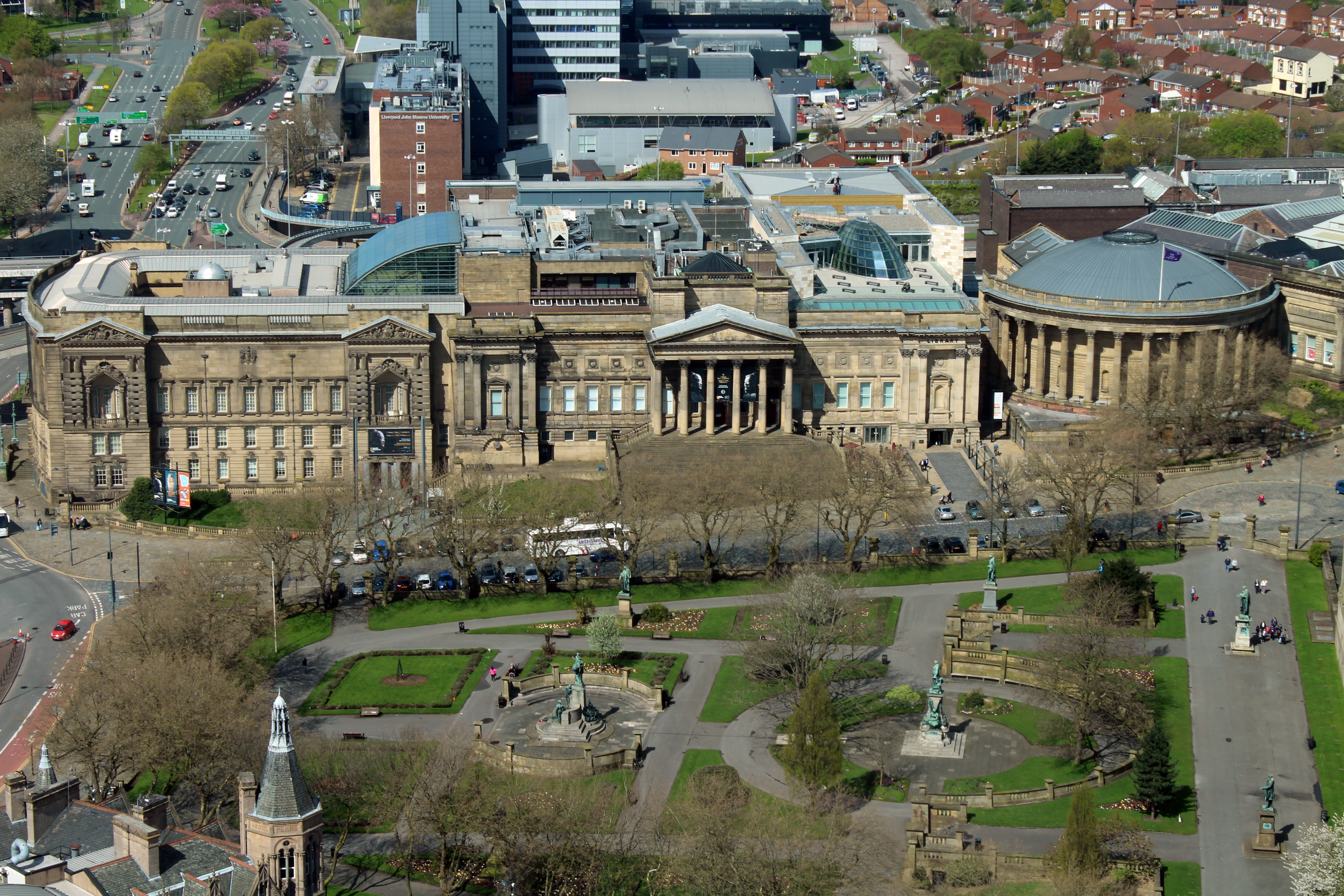
St John's Gardens in foreground
(1904; Grade II several of the monuments are individually listed grade II)

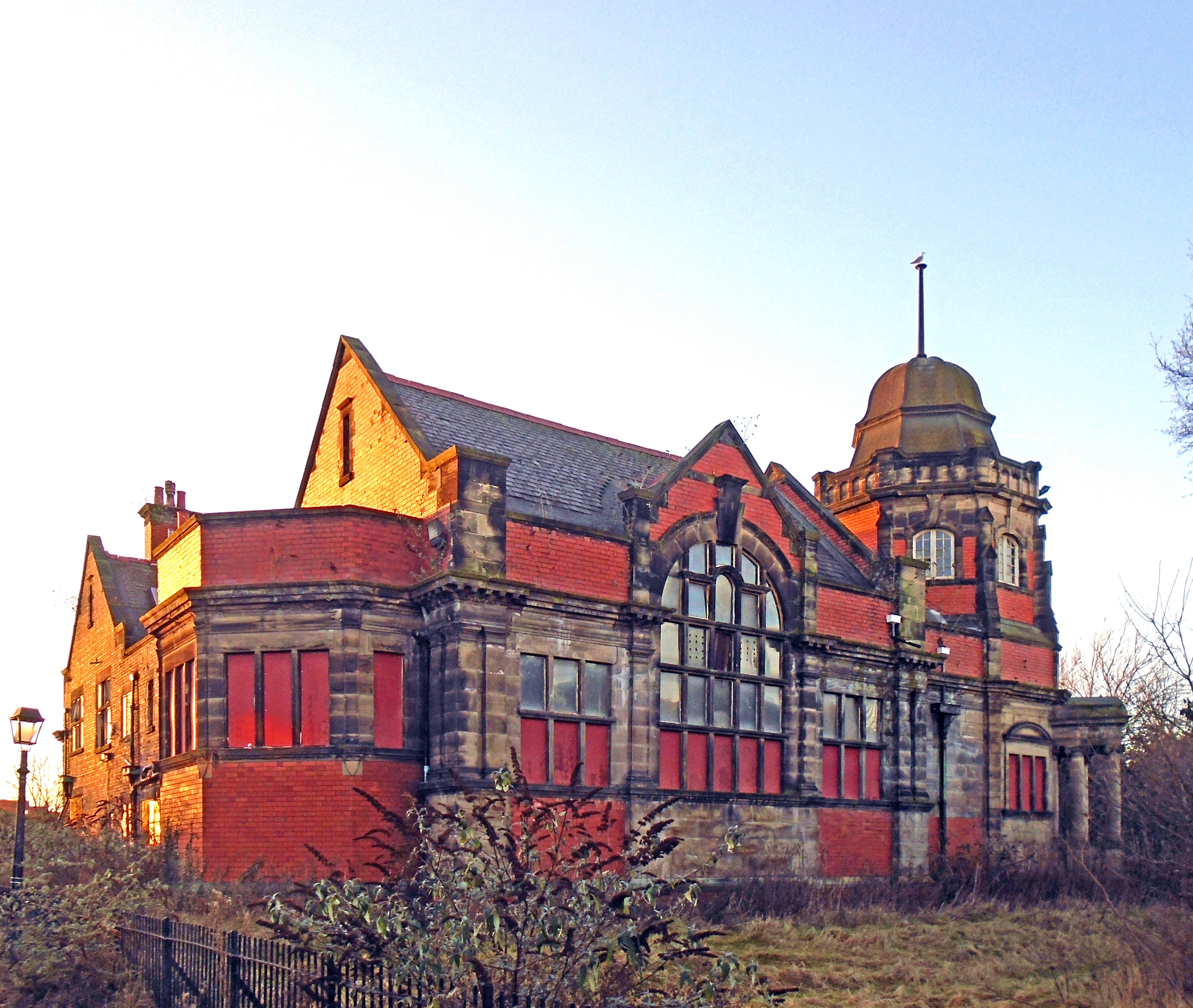
Lister Drive Carnegie Library, Tue Brook
(1904–05; Grade II)

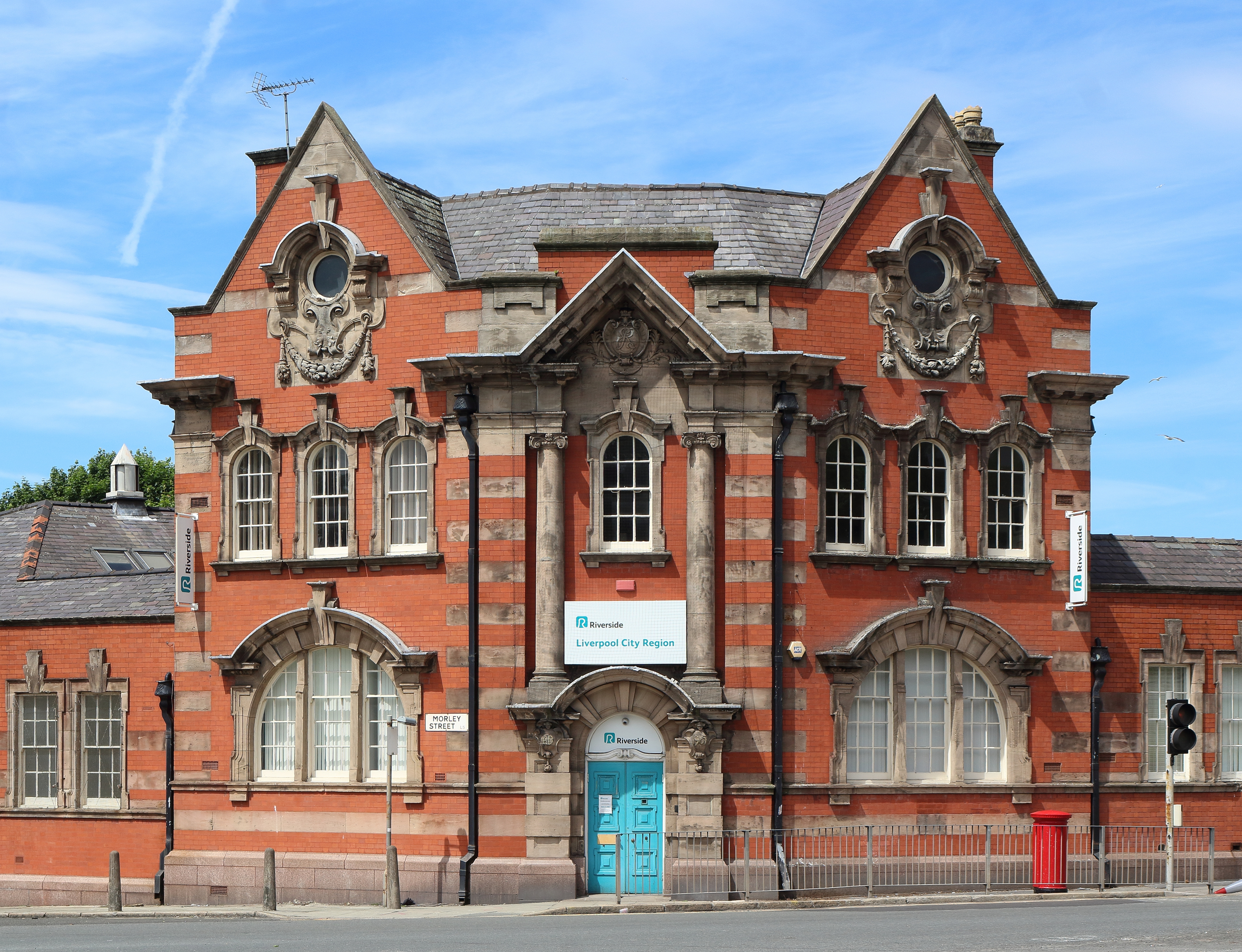
Kirkdale Post Office, Walton Road, Kirkdale
(1905; Grade II)

=== Edwardian medical, school, college and university buildings ===
The university built the Derby Building (1905) for the electronics department, designed by Willink & Thicknesse who also designed Johnston Building and George Holt Physics Laboratory (1904) with F.M. Simpson the then professor of architecture at the University of Liverpool. His successor Charles Herbert Reilly designed the Students' Union Building for the university, it was built 1910–12. It has been extended several times since. The Harrison-Hughes Engineering Laboratories followed in 1912 by Briggs, Wolstenholme & Thornely. Formerly Faculty of Arts, for the University of Liverpool, the Ashton Building dated 1913, was designed by Briggs, Wolstenholme and Thornely. Former School of Hygiene and City Laboratories (1914), University of Liverpool, Mount Pleasant, by successive surveyors to Liverpool Corporation, Thomas Shelmerdine & Albert D. Jenkins. Liverpool College of Art (1910) was extended with a new wing on Hope Street by Willink & Thickness. The Liverpool School of Tropical Medicine (1913–15), Pembroke Place, was a new building. Also Liverpool Infirmary was extended (1909–10) by James F. Doyle, copying the earlier style of Alfred Waterhouse.

It was in this period that the Liverpool Blue Coat School was rebuilt on a new site in Wavertree, designed by Briggs, Wolstenholme and Thornely, and constructed 1903–06, in a typically Edwardian Baroque style.

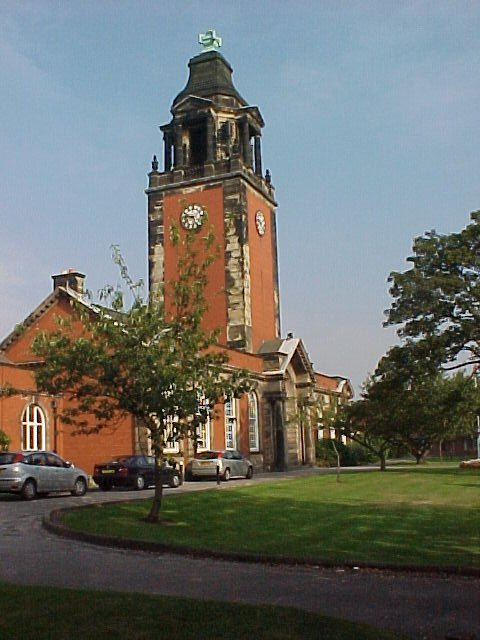
Blue Coat School, Church Road, Wavertree
(1903–06; Grade II*)

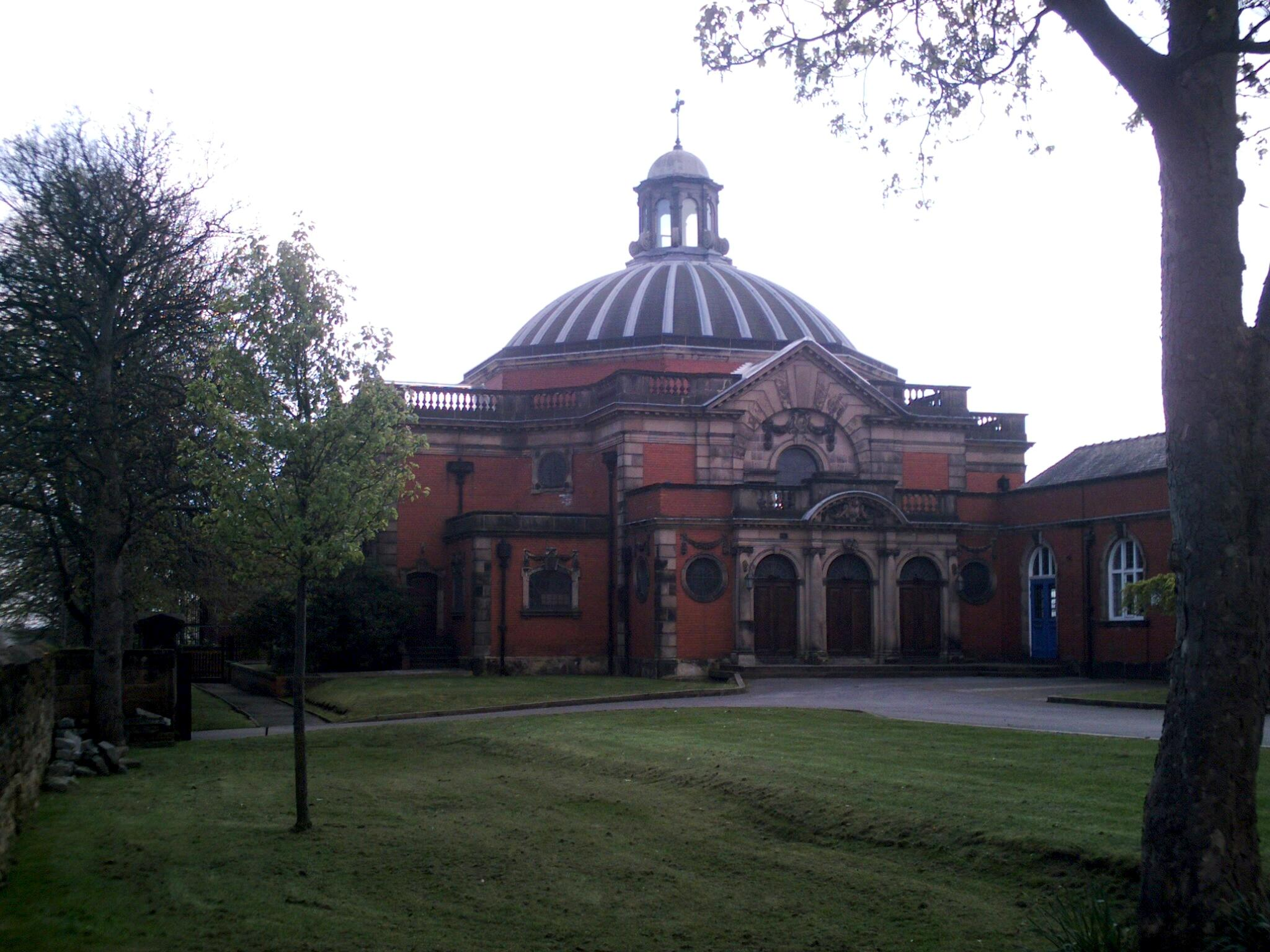
The chapel, Blue Coat School, Church Road, Wavertree
(1903–06; Grade II*)

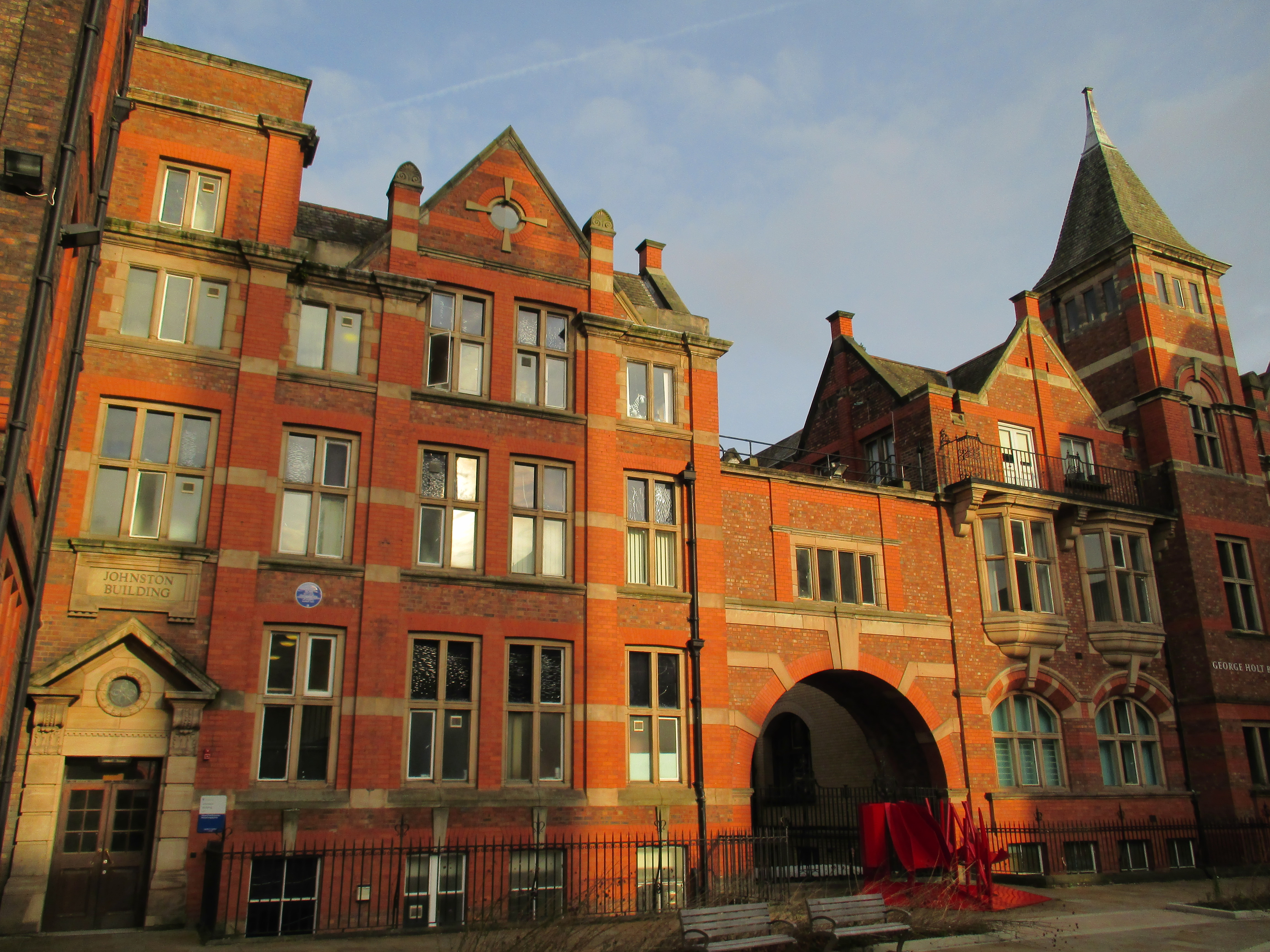
Johnston Building and George Holt Building, University of Liverpool
(1904; Grade II)

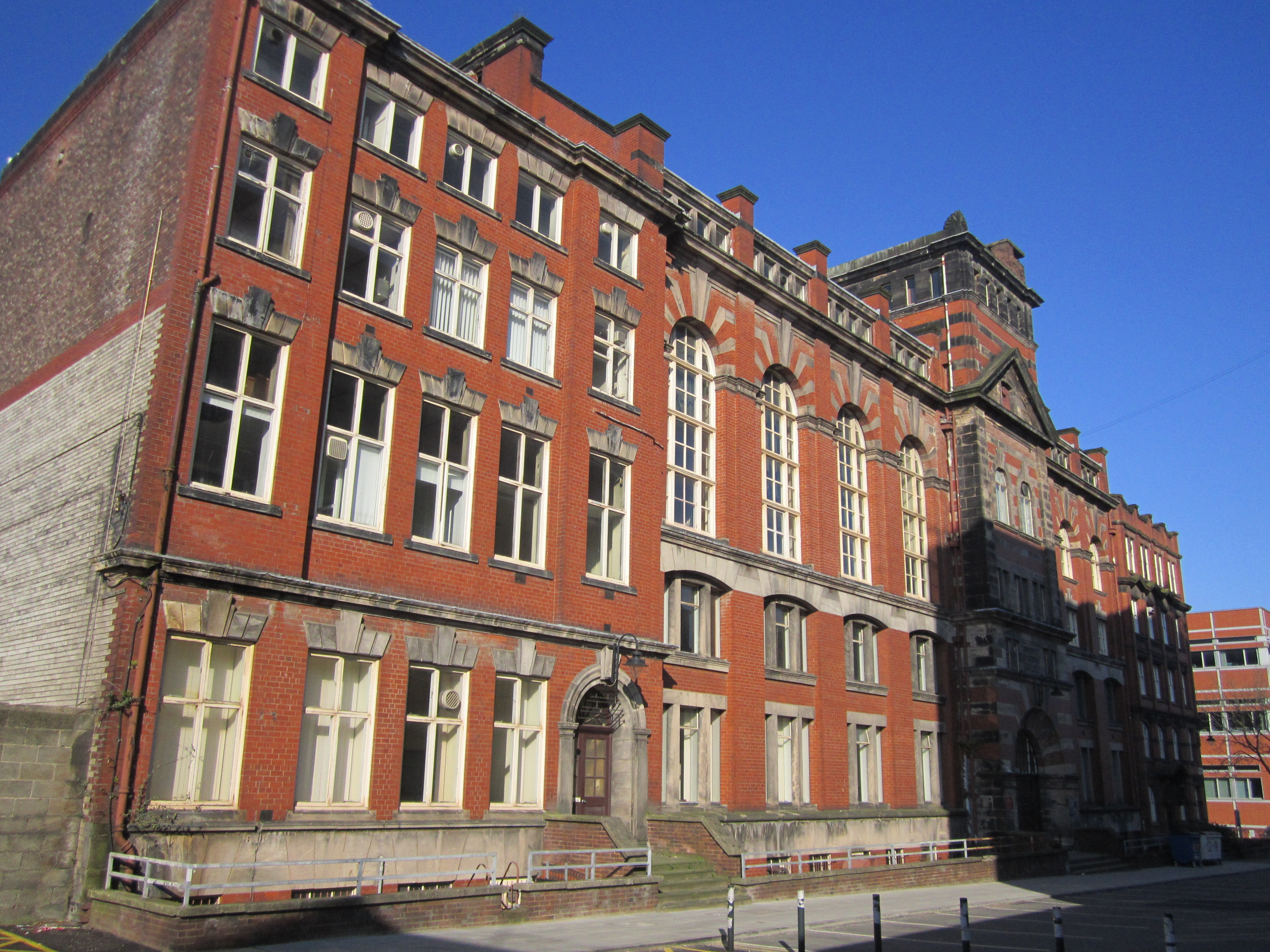
Derby Building, University of Liverpool, Brownlow Street
(1905; unlisted)

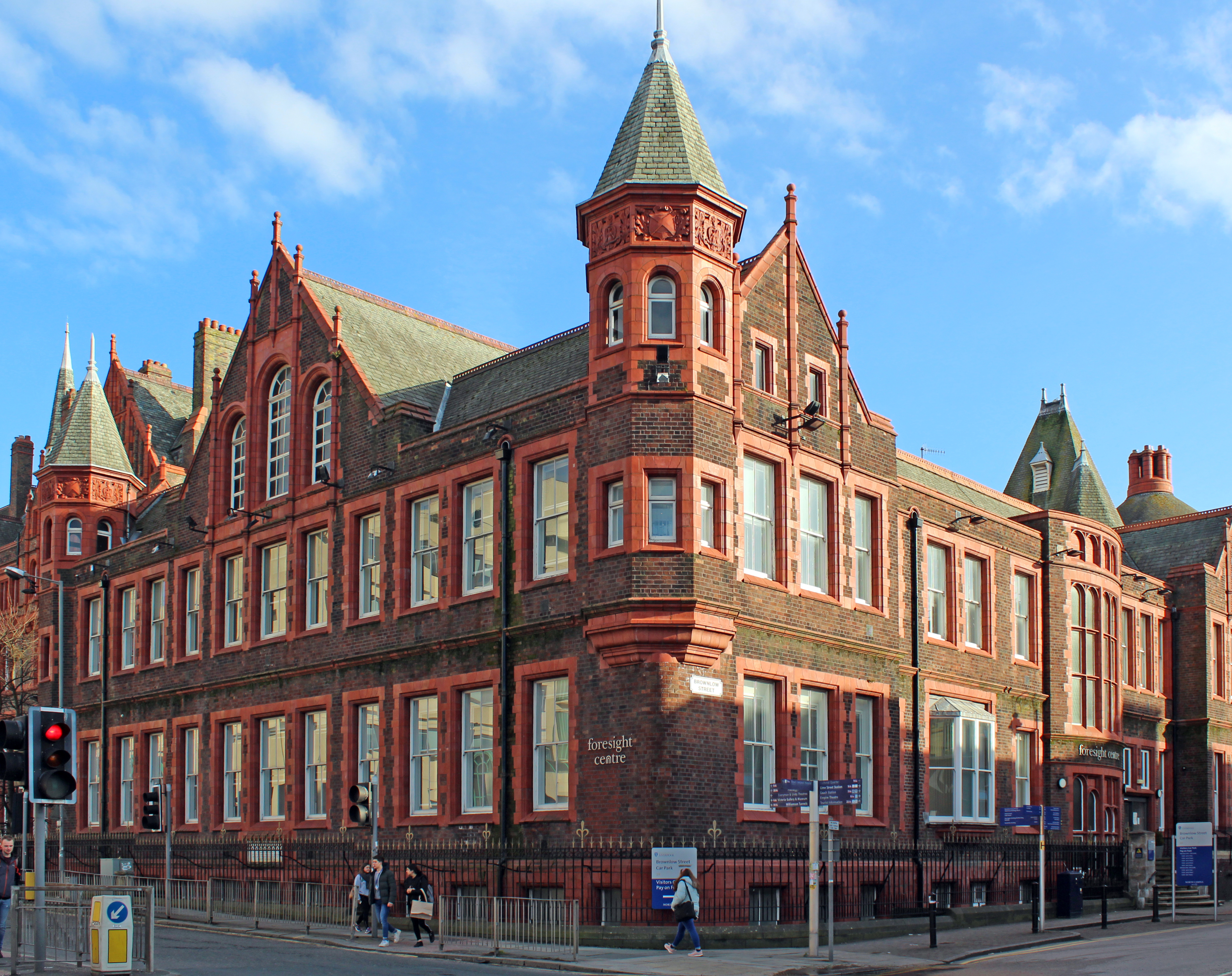
Extension to former Liverpool Infirmary, now Foresight Centre, Pembroke Place
(1909–11; unlisted)

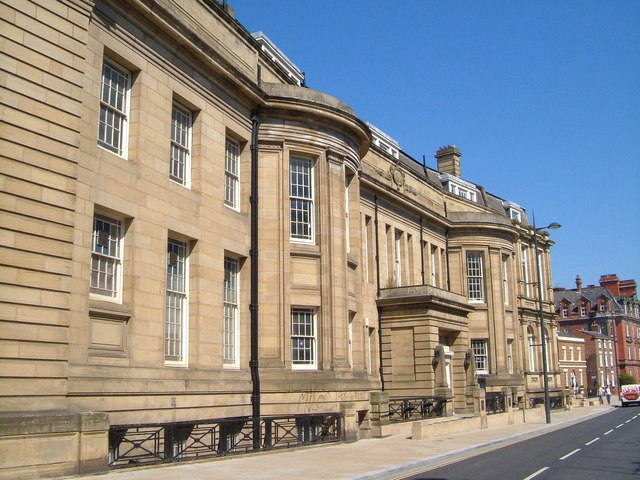
Liverpool College of Art, new wing, Hope Street
(1910; Grade II)

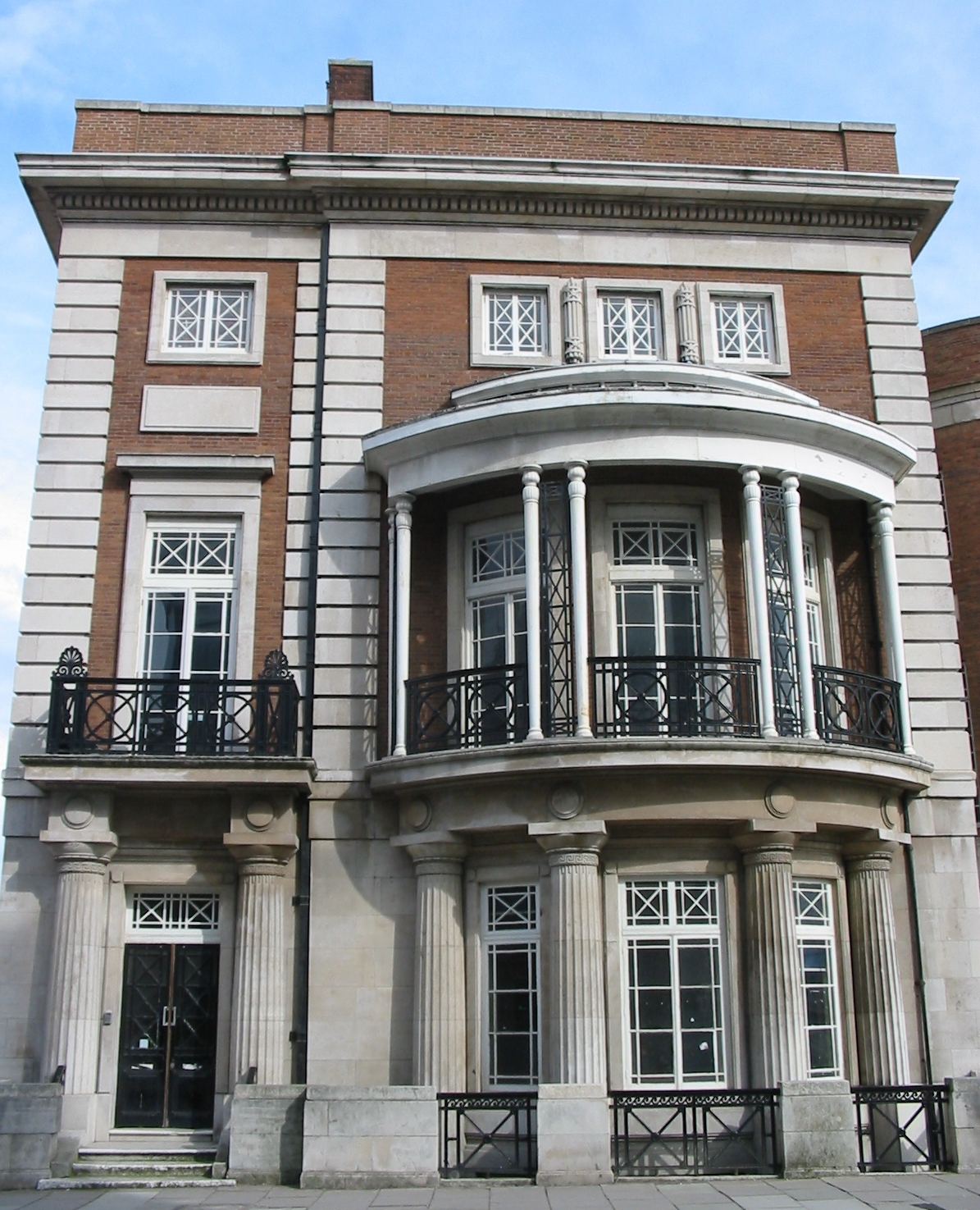
Students' Union Building, University of Liverpool, Mount Pleasant
(1910–12; Grade II)

=== Edwardian cathedrals & churches ===
Liverpool's wealth as a port city enabled the construction of two enormous cathedrals, both dating from the 20th century. The Anglican Cathedral (1904–78), which was designed by Sir Giles Gilbert Scott and plays host to the annual Liverpool Shakespeare Festival. The first part of the cathedral completed was the Lady Chapel opened in 1910. It has one of the longest naves, largest organs and heaviest and highest peals of bells in the world. The Roman Catholic Metropolitan Cathedral on Mount Pleasant next to Liverpool Science Park was initially planned to be even larger. Of Edwin Lutyens' gigantic original design, only the crypt (1933–41) was completed before it was abandoned. The road running between the two cathedrals is called Hope Street, a coincidence that pleases believers. Giles Gilbert Scott also designed the Church of St Paul, Liverpool for the Church of England, it was built 1913–16. A fine Roman Catholic church of the era is St Mary of the Angels, Liverpool, England, that served a Franciscan friary, (1907–10) by Pugin & Pugin it is of brick in Italian Romanesque style. Also Roman Catholic is the Church of St Philip Neri designed by Matthew Honan (killed in the First World War), in a Byzantine style, simplified in execution by M. J. Worthy and Alfred Rigby. The Baptist church in Dovedale Road (1905–06) is uniquely for Liverpool built from flint with red brick dressings.

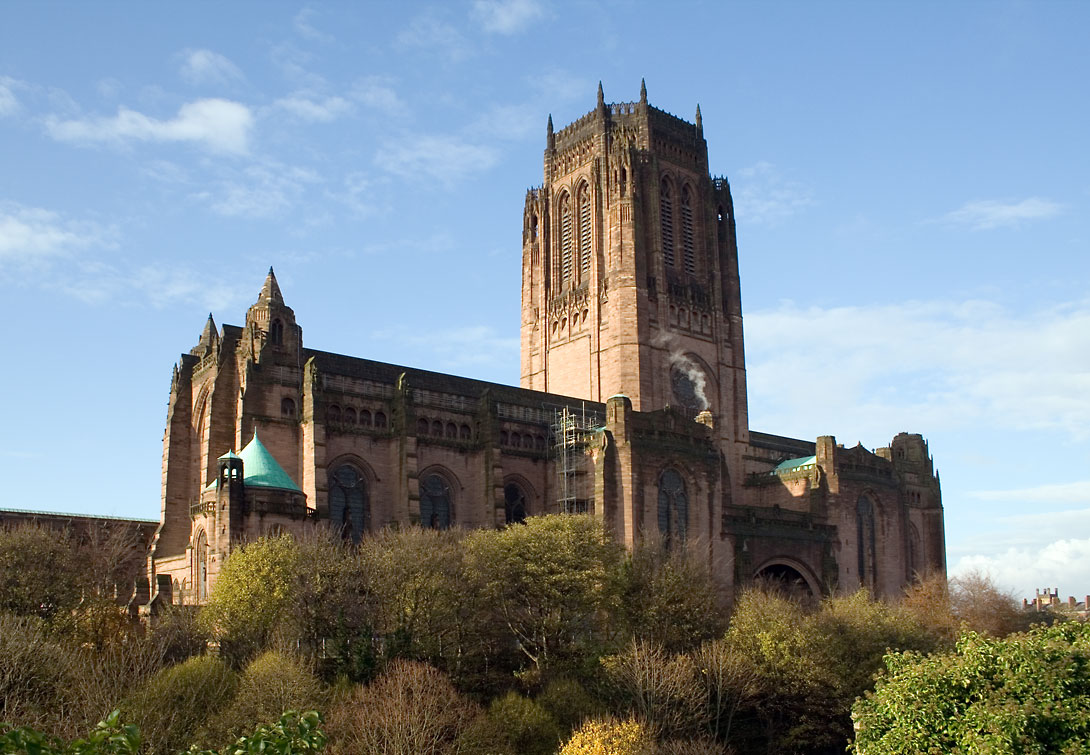
Liverpool Anglican Cathedral
(1901–78; Grade I)
The UK's largest cathedral

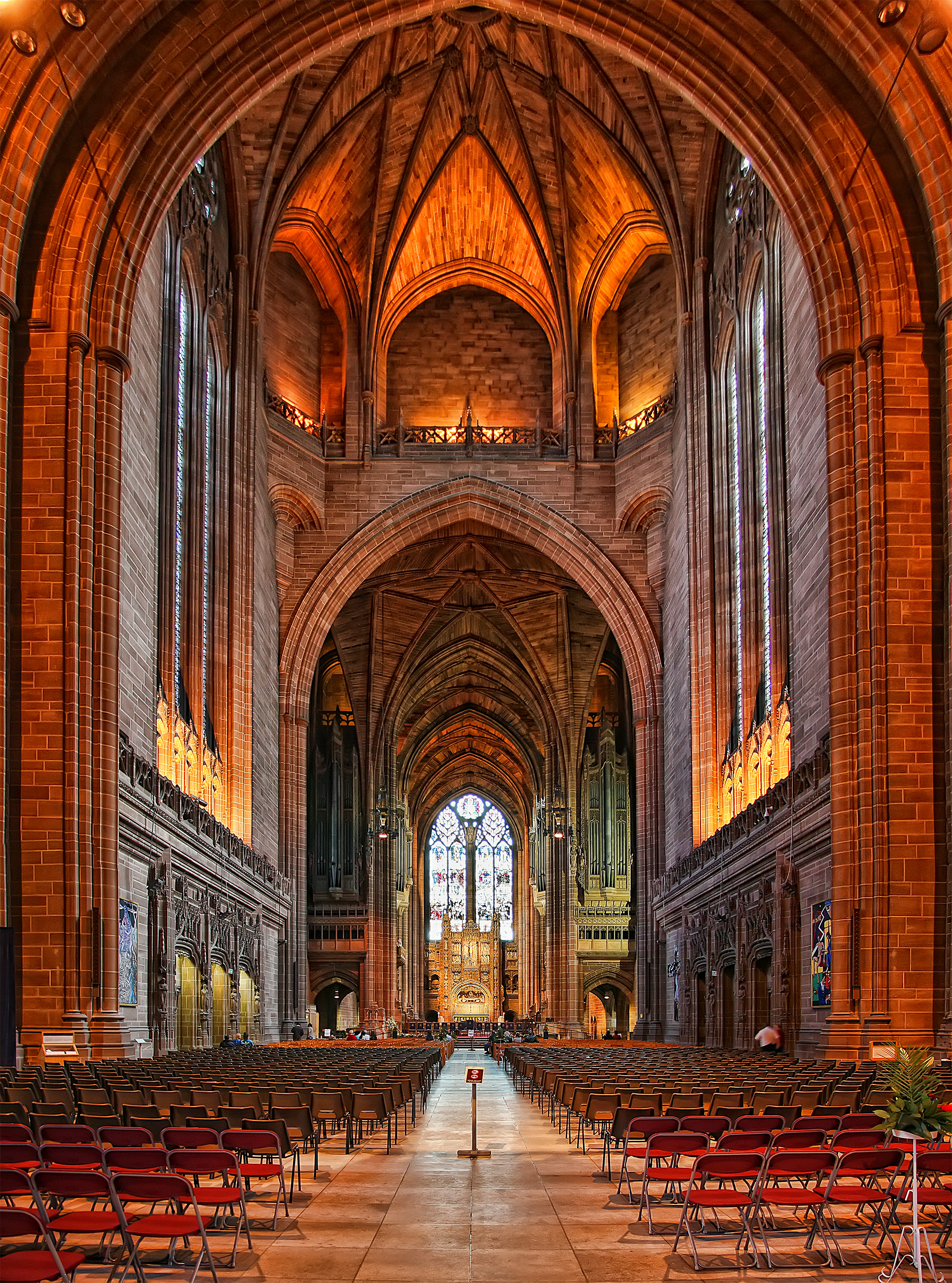
Liverpool Anglican Cathedral
Interior

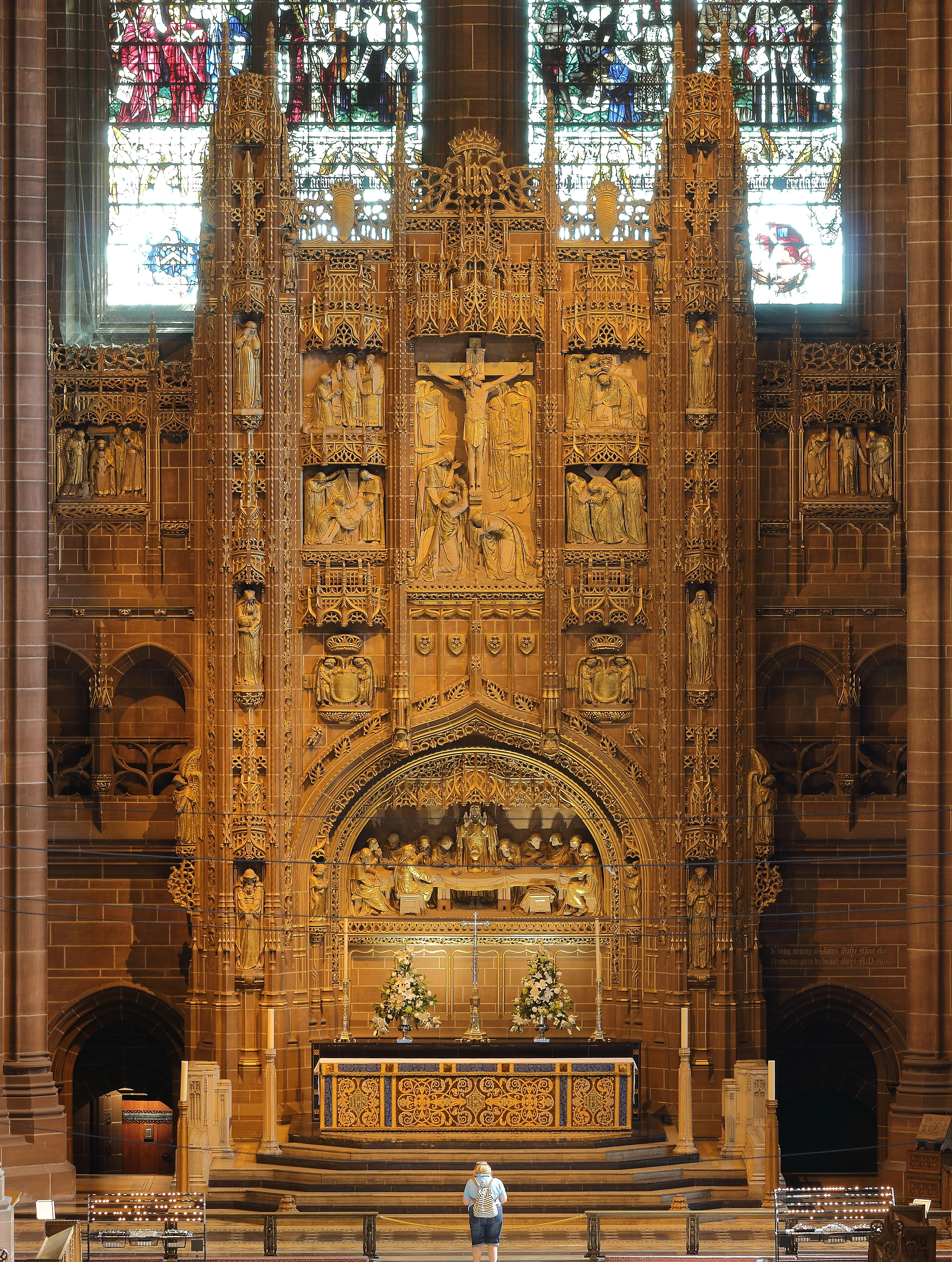
Anglican Cathedral, High Altar & Reredos

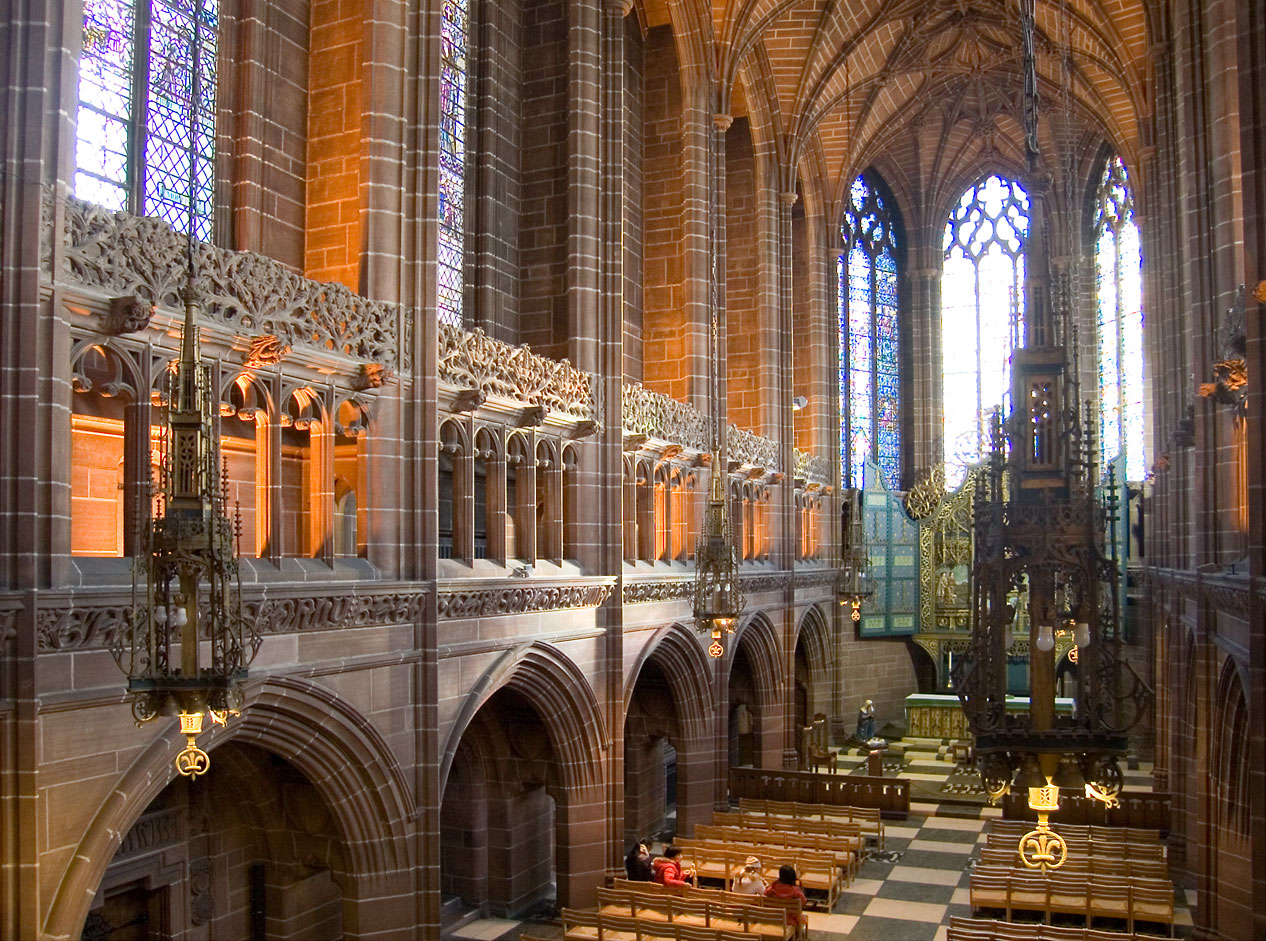
The Lady Chapel, Anglican Cathedral
(1901–10; Grade I)

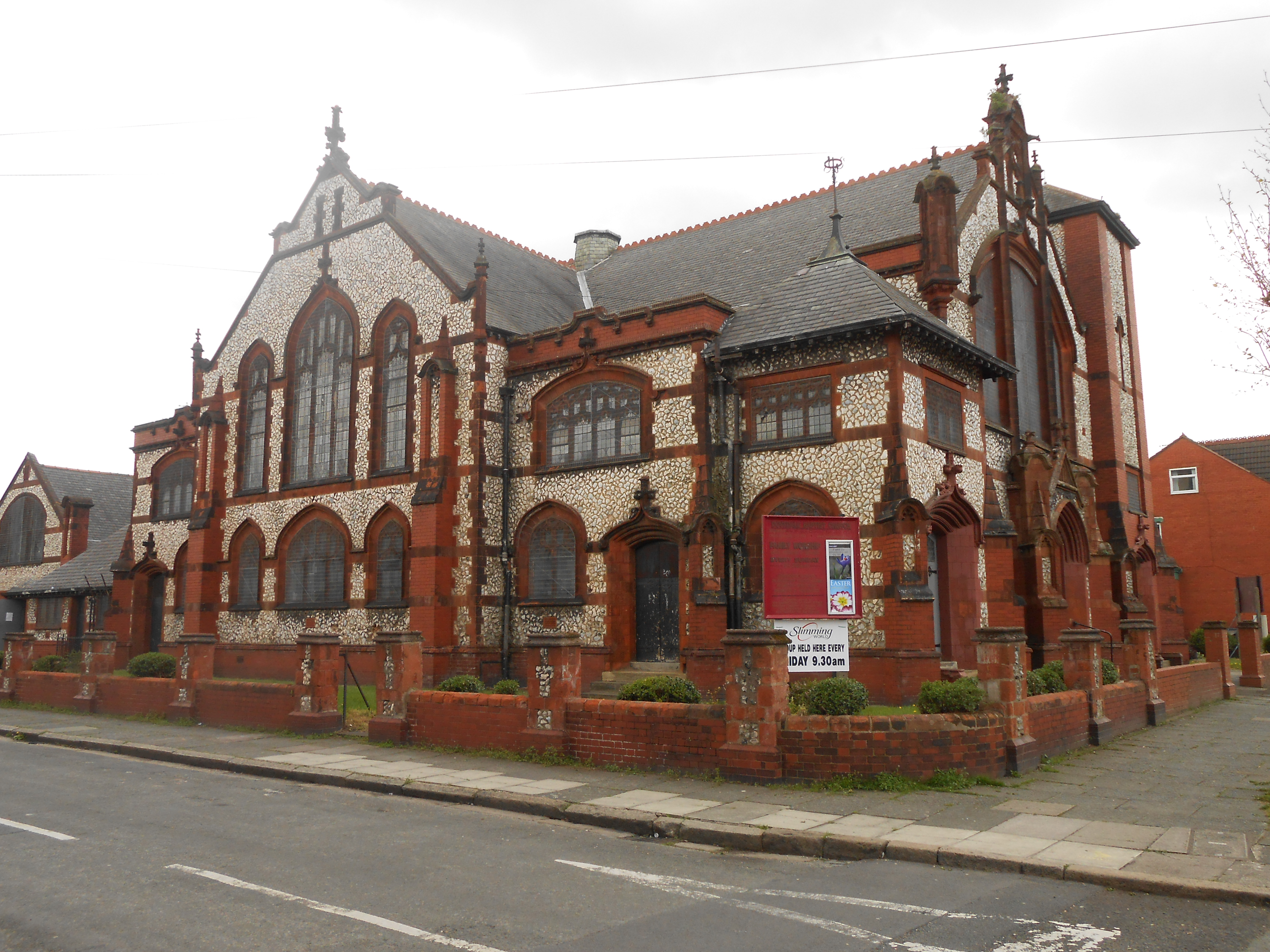
Dovedale Baptist Church, Dovedale Road, Mossley Hill
(1906; Grade II)

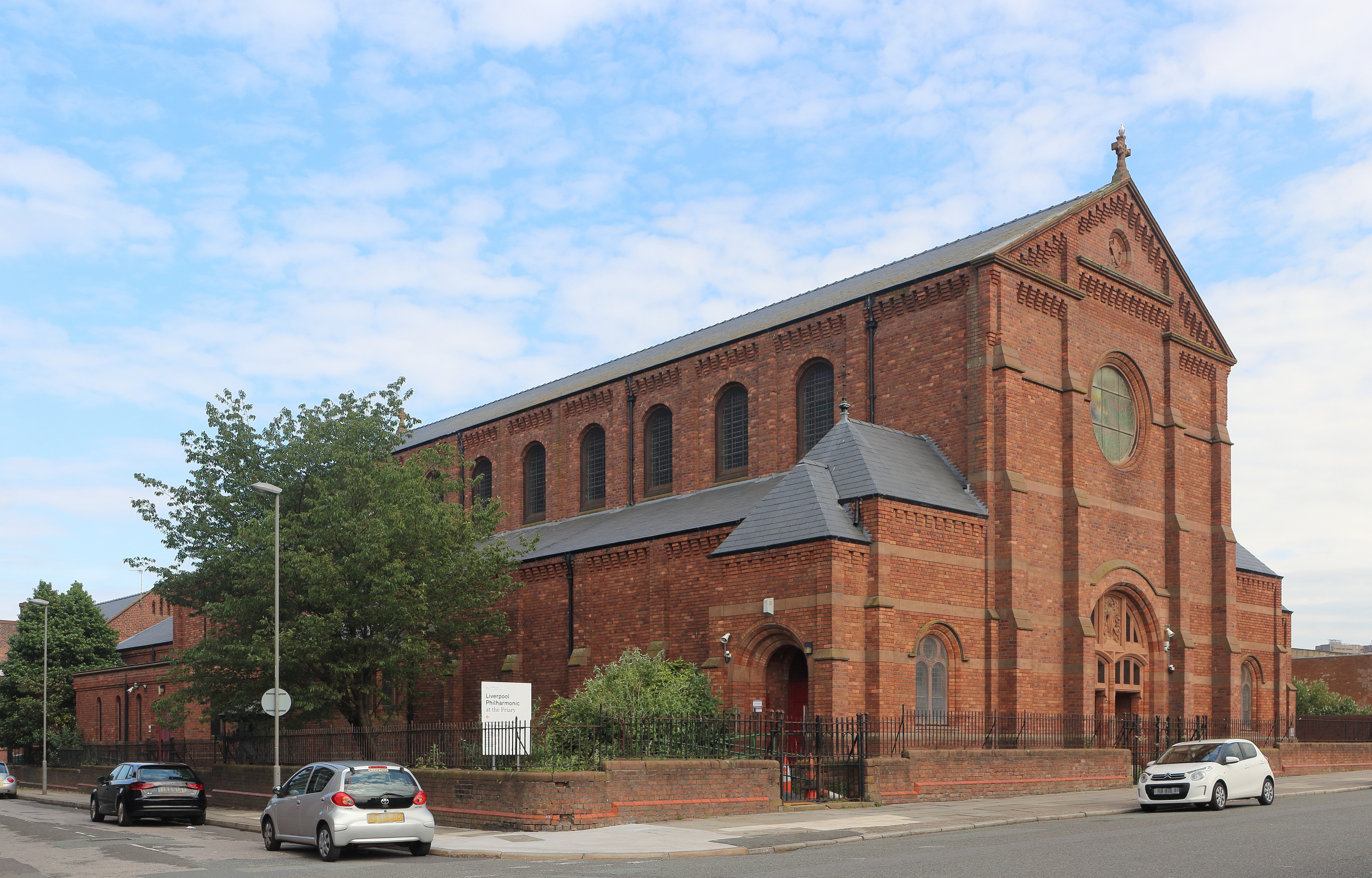
Church of St Mary of the Angels, Rose Place, Everton
(1907–10; Grade II)

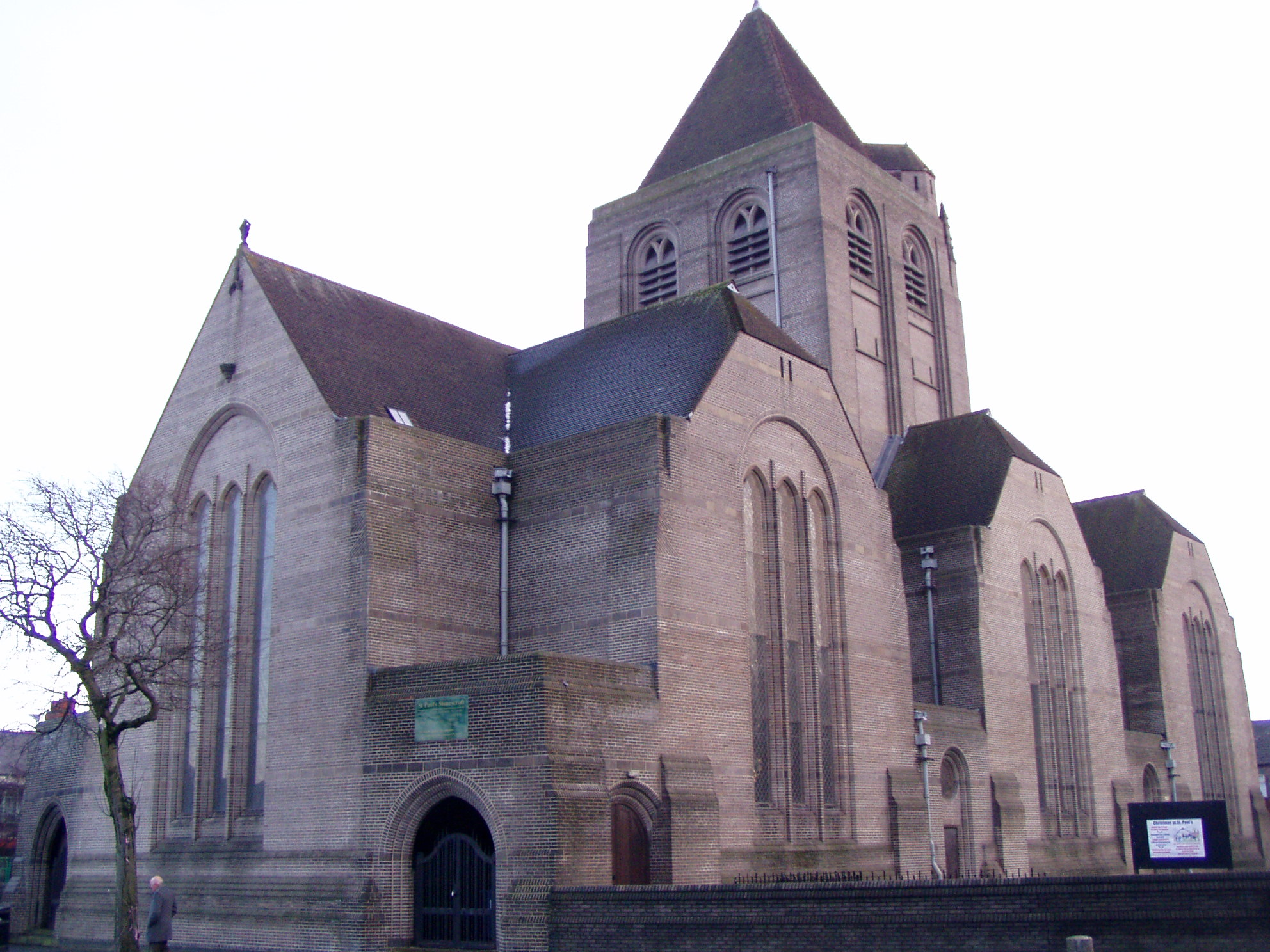
Church of St Paul, Derby Lane, Stoneycroft
(1913–16; Grade II*)

=== Edwardian domestic buildings ===
The Eldon Grove estate, Vauxhall, was built 1910–12 as some of Liverpool's earliest municipal housing. It includes Bevington Street lined with two-storey workers housing. It was in 1910 that Wavertree Garden Suburb was established by Henry Vivian, the architect in charge of designing the layout and designing the housing for the first phase was Raymond Unwin, the second phase started in 1913 and was the work of G.L. Sutcliffe, when construction ceased in 1915 360 of a planned 1,800 houses had been built.

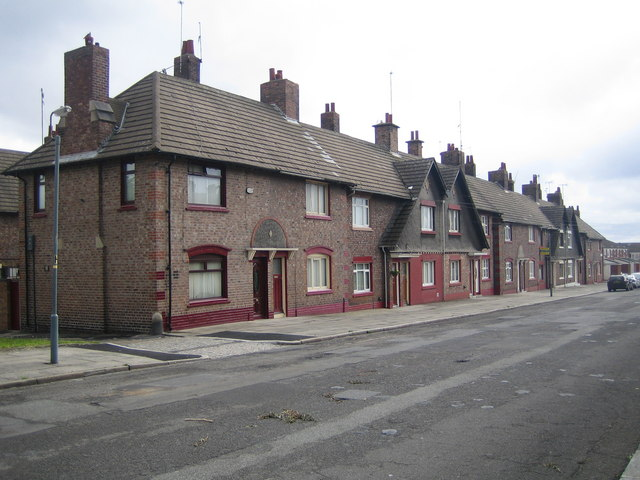
Bevington Street, Vauxhall
(1911; unlisted)

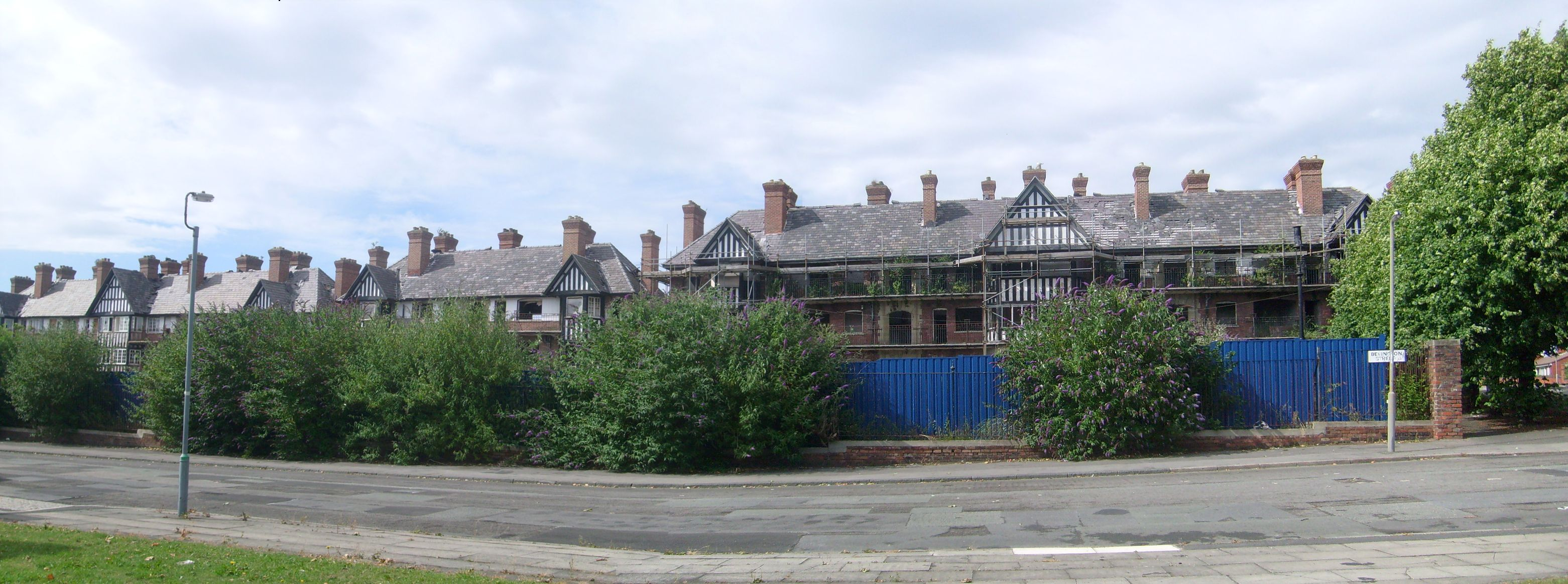
Bevington Street, Eldon Grove Labourers' Dwellings
(1912; Grade II)

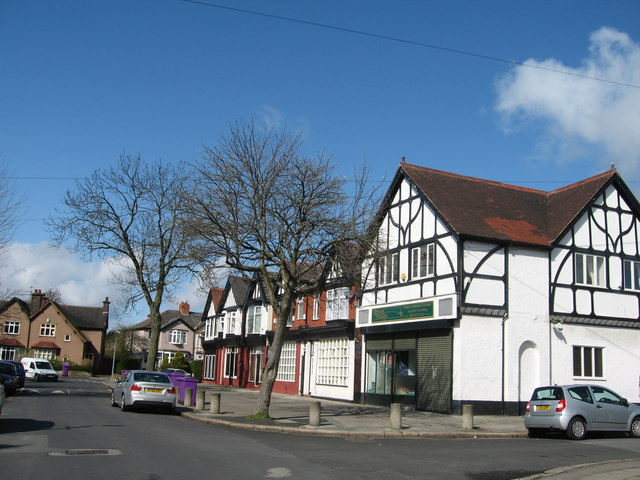
Shops in Nook Road, Wavertree Garden Suburb
(1910–15; conservation area)

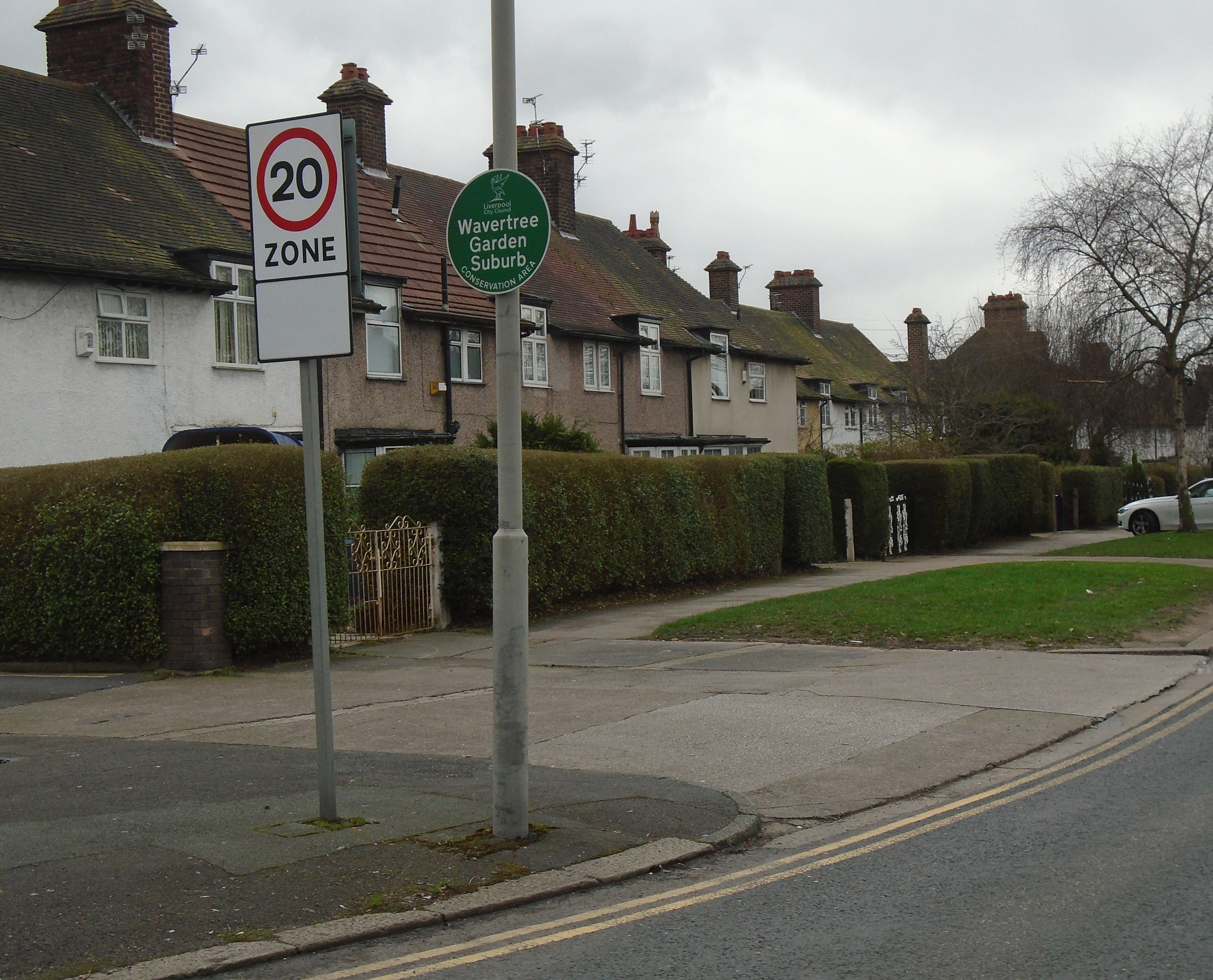
Housing in Thingwall Road, Wavertree Garden Suburb
(1910–15; conservation area)

== Inter-war period & World War II (1919–1945) ==
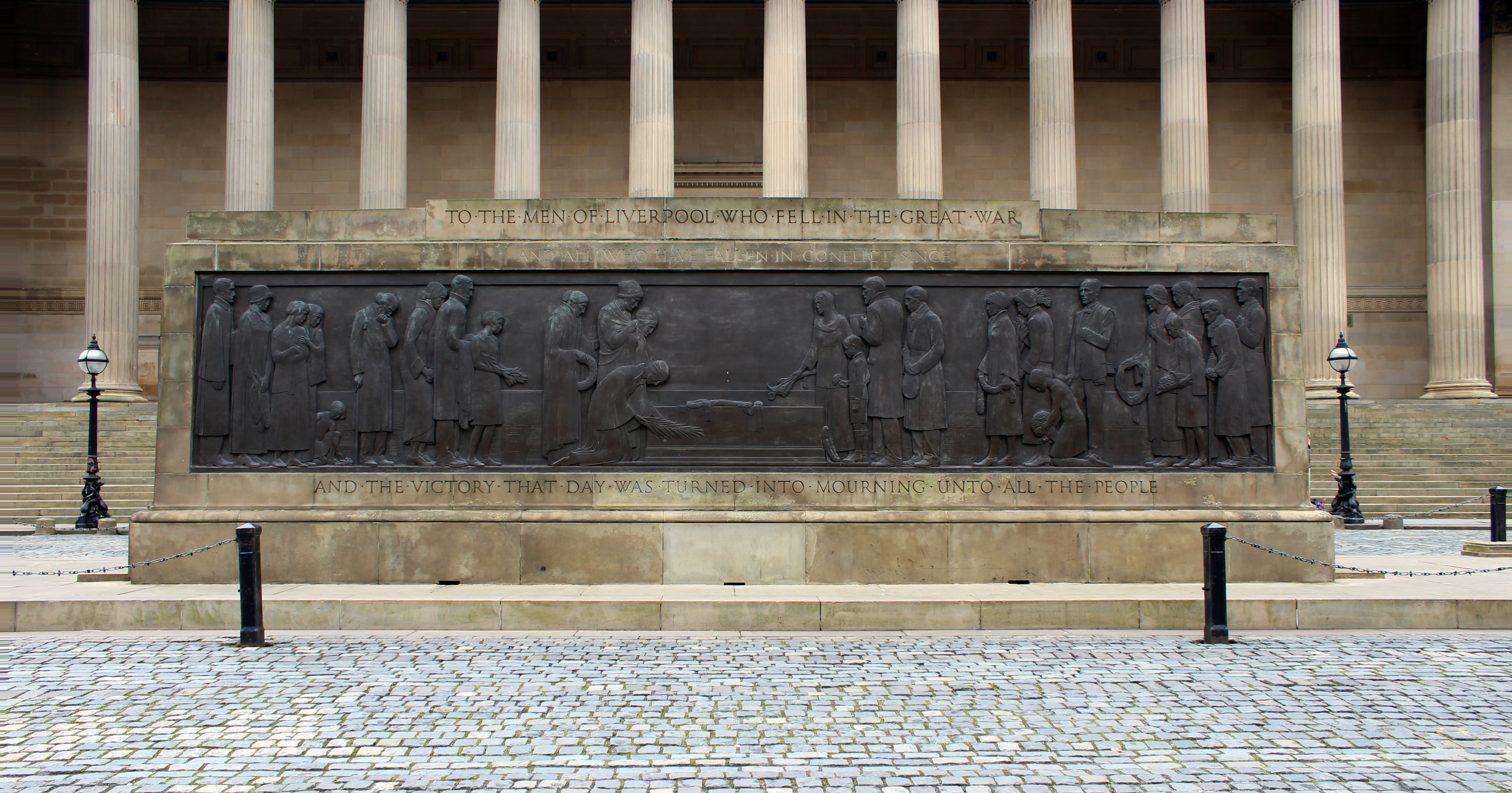
Liverpool Cenotaph (1927–30; Grade I)

The Liverpool Cenotaph designed by Lionel Bailey Budden was built (1927–30) with sculpture by Herbert Tyson Smith commemorates Liverpool's dead of World War I, a total of 9068, later this extended to the dead of World War II and other conflicts. During World War II the port would see 1285 convoys of up to 50 ships and over 4,700,000 troops pass through it, over 90 acres of the docks and warehousing would be totally destroyed and another 90 acres put out of use due to enemy bombing.

=== Inter-war transport ===
Innovation in transport in the era included the Liverpool–East Lancashire Road, designed by John Alexander Brodie opened in 1934 it was the first purpose-built intercity highway in the UK. Another area of innovation was Speke Airport, it is in the south of the city, the art deco former terminal building, designed by Edward Bloomfield, who also designed the hangar 1, then at 212 feet wide by 400 feet long the world's largest. The terminal in use from the 1930s to 1986, has been adapted for use as a hotel and is now the Crowne Plaza Liverpool John Lennon Airport. Speke was the first provincial airport in the UK, opened in 1933, and its restored terminal has been described as "still the most coherent example of the first generation of purpose-built airports remaining in Europe." The terraces from which fans welcomed home the Beatles have been preserved. Another innovation in transport was the road tunnel under the River Mersey known as the Queensway Tunnel, built (1925–34). Gladstone Dock was opened 1927.

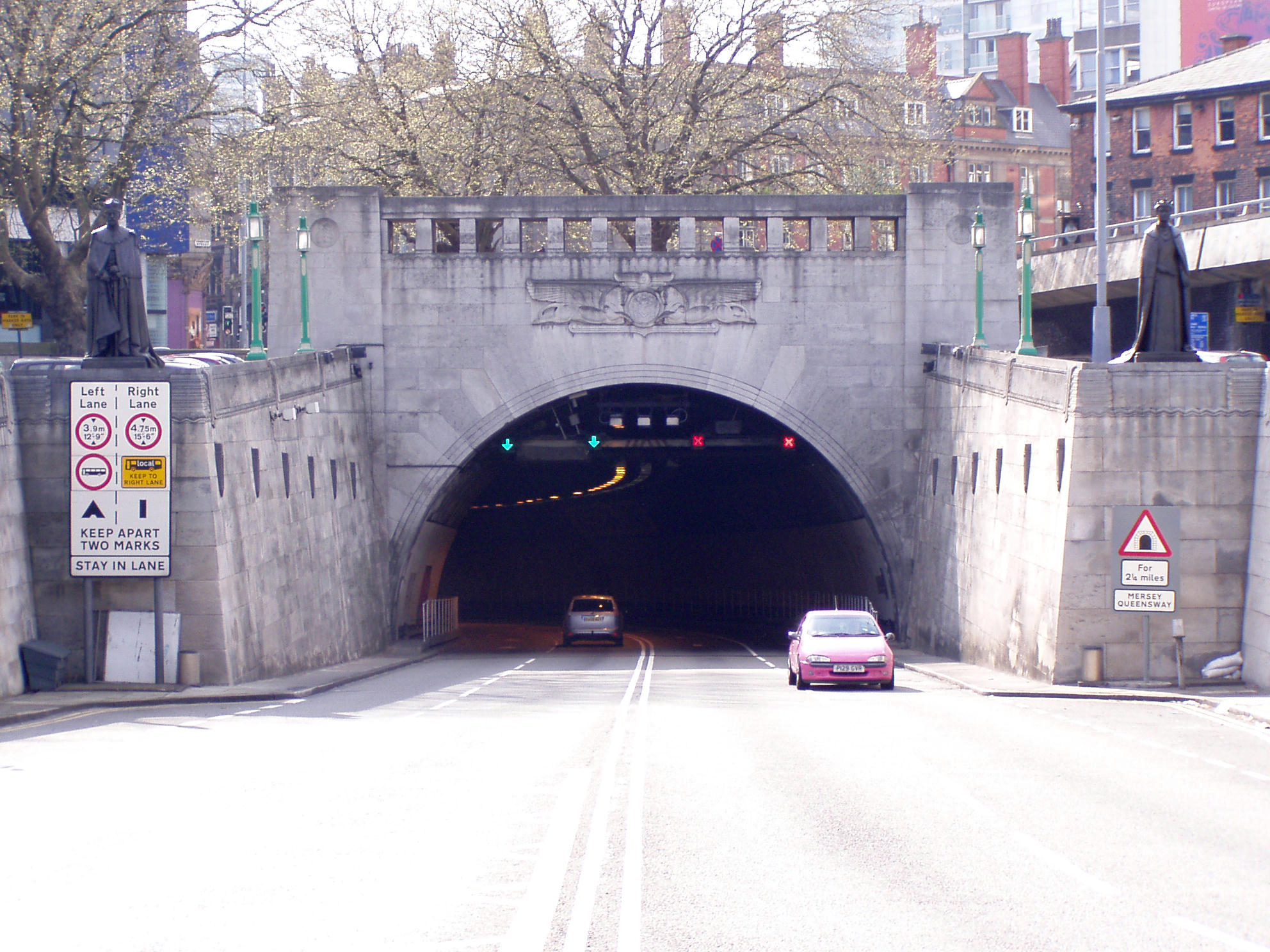
Liverpool entrance to Queensway Tunnel
(1925–31; Grade II)

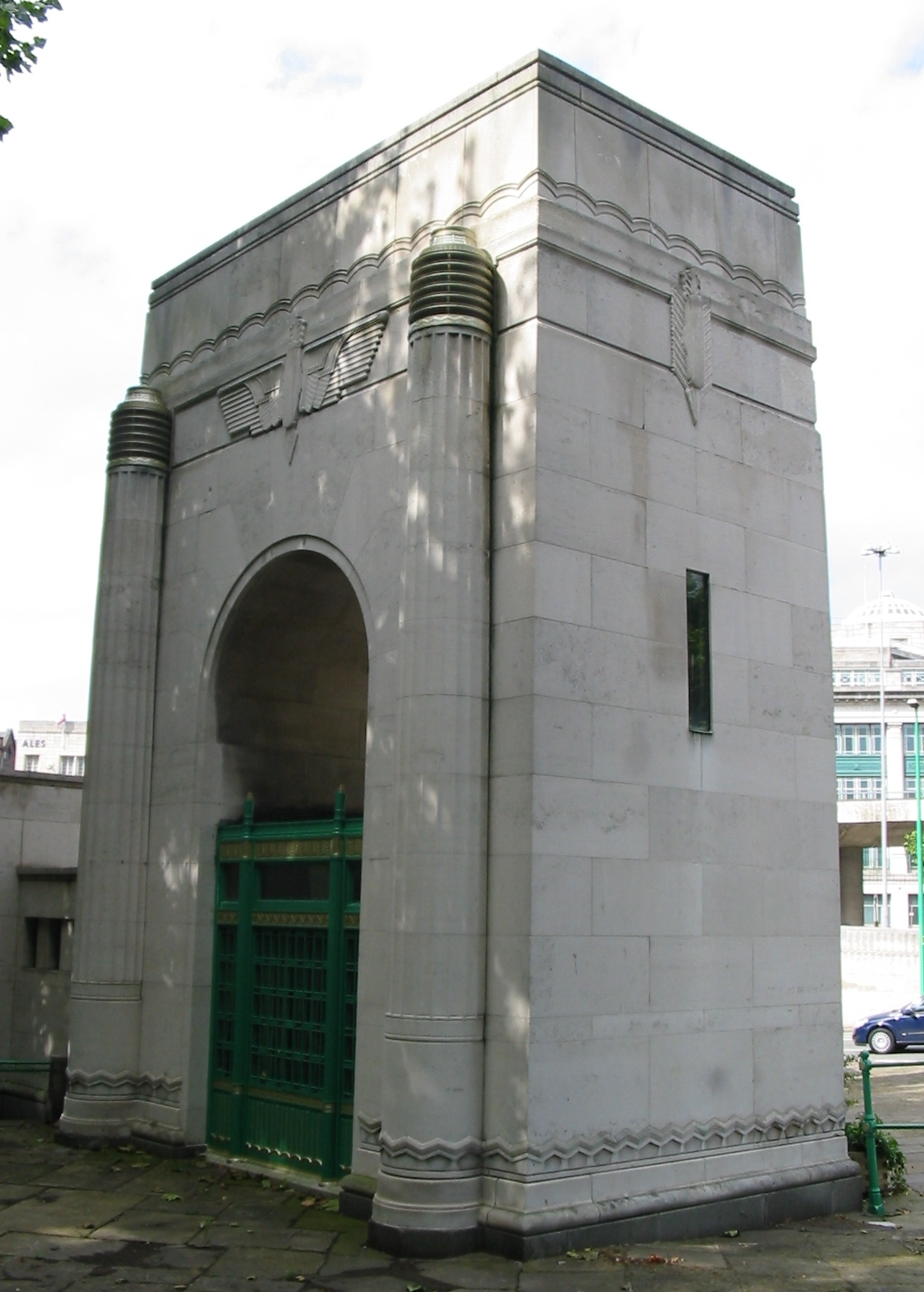
North Lodge, Queensway Tunnel
(1925–31; Grade II)

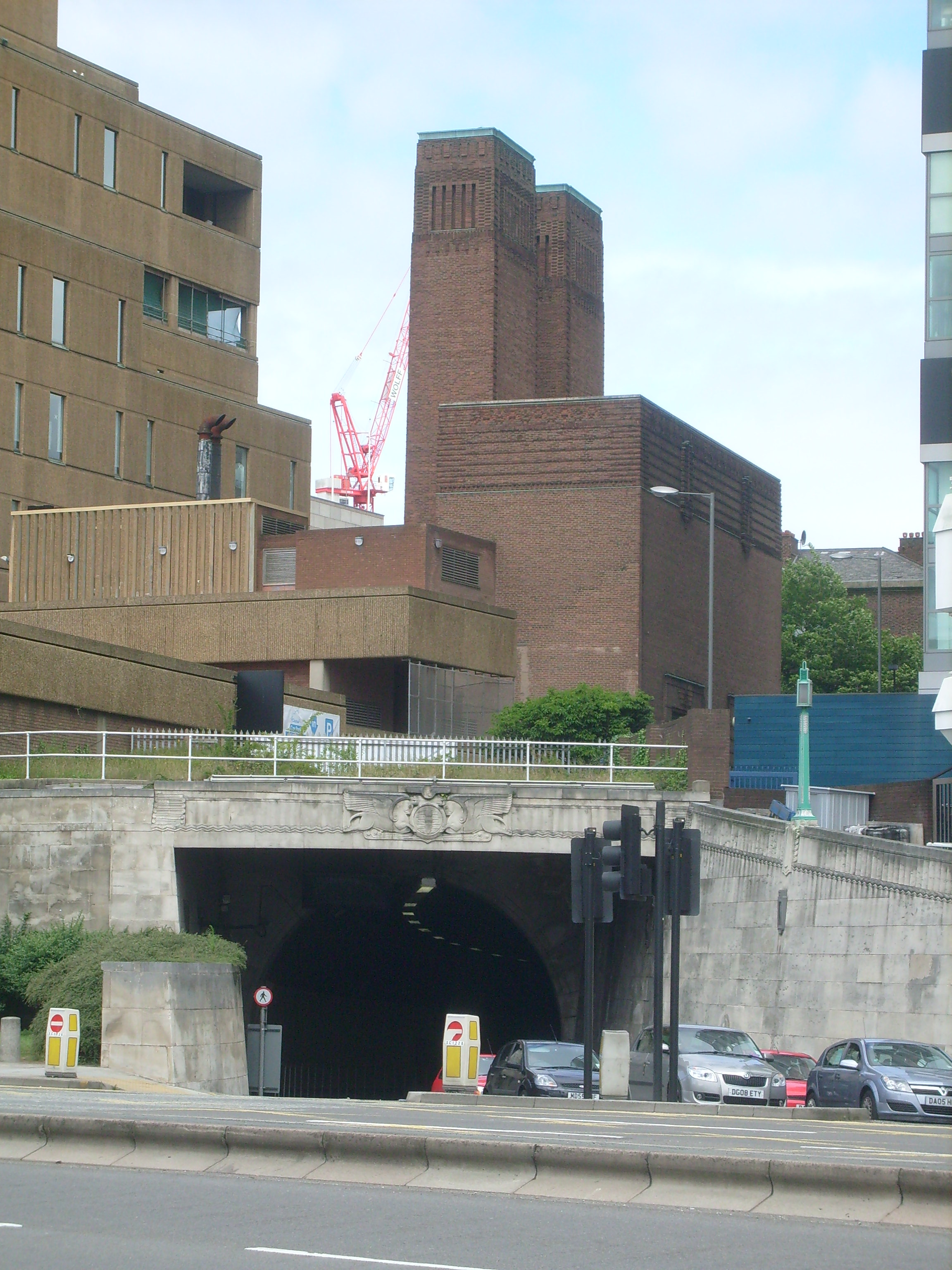
The Dock entrance to the Queensway Tunnel, with the brick New Quay Ventilation Station in the centre of the picture
(1925–31; Grade II)

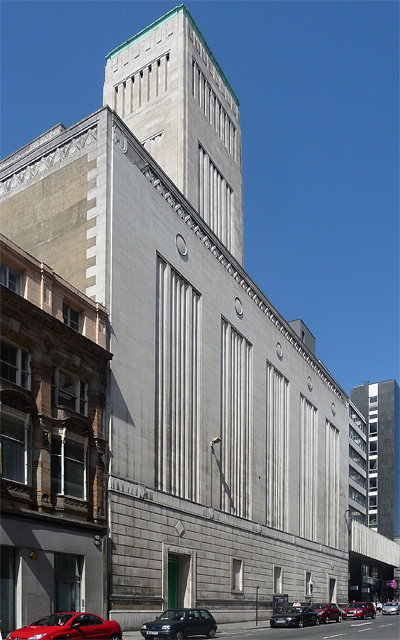
Ventilation Station for Queensway Tunnel, North John Street
(1925–31; Grade II)

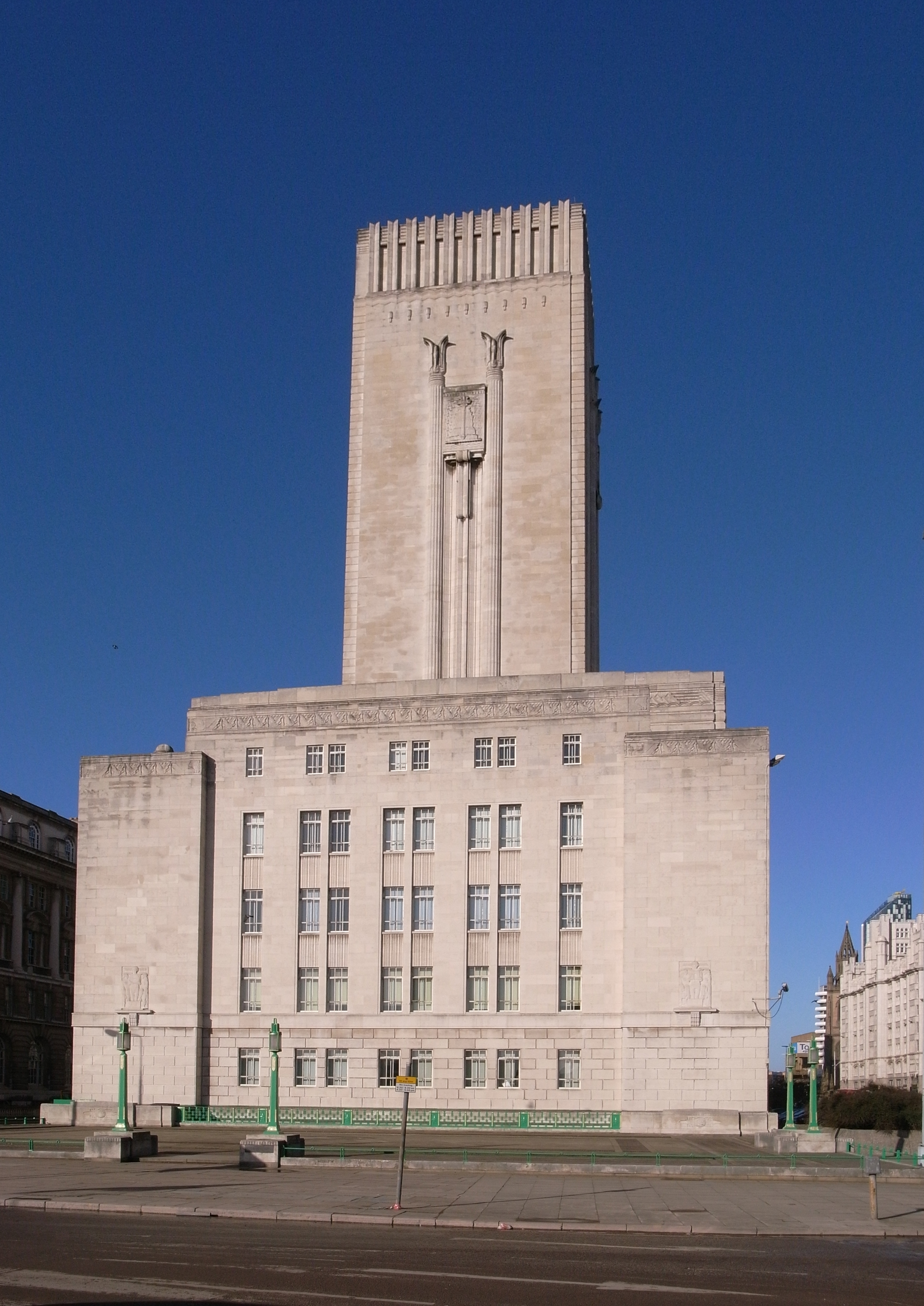
George's Dock Ventilation and Control Station for Queensway Tunnel, Pier Head
(1932; Grade II)

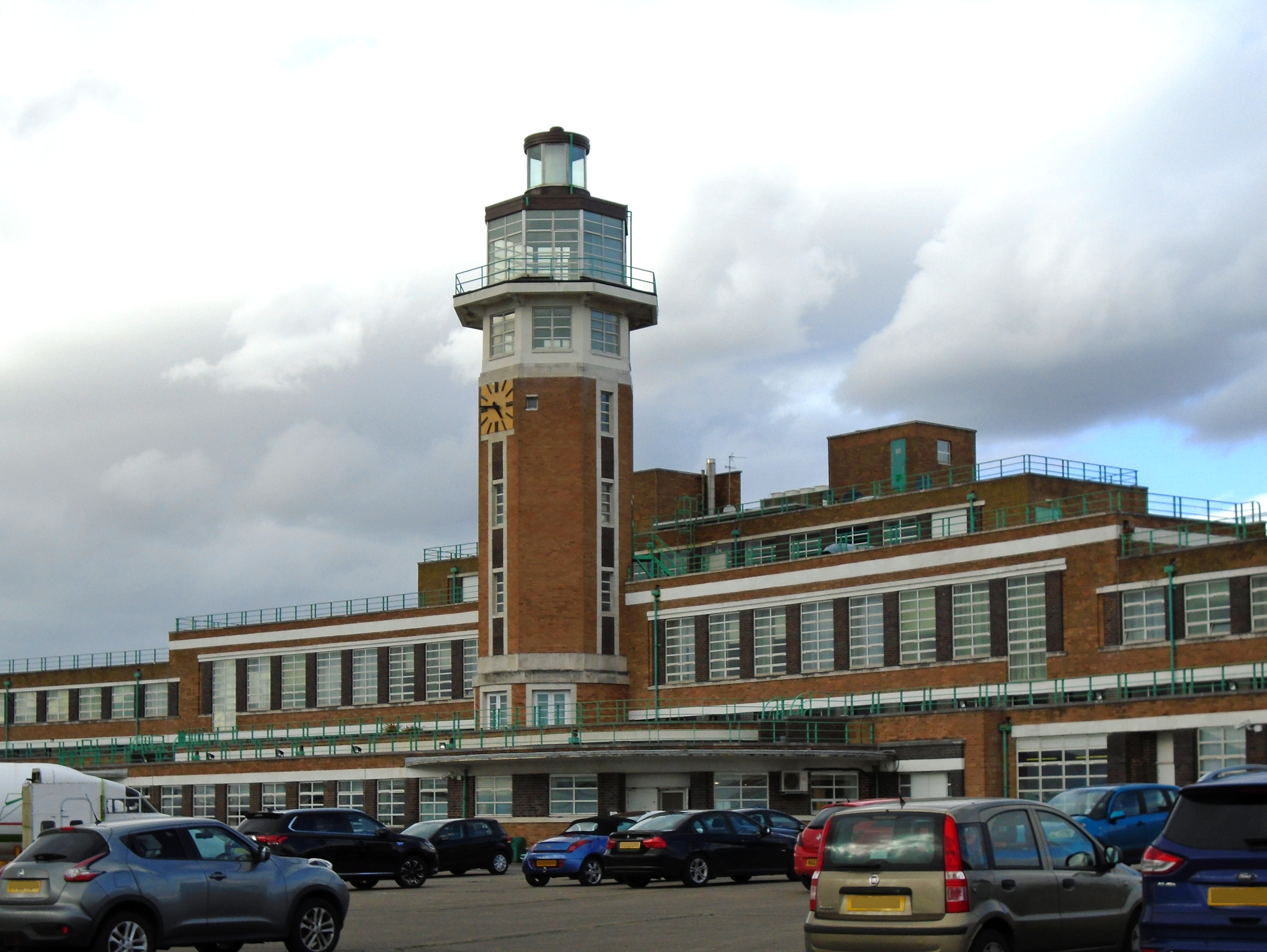
Former Speke Airport
(1933–37; Grade II*)

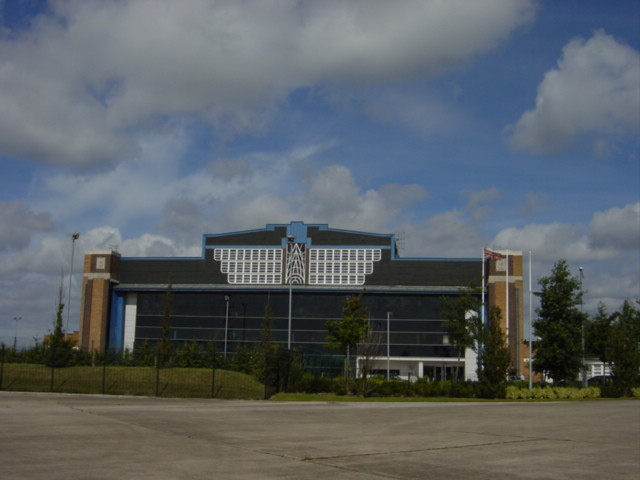
Former aeroplane hangar 1, Speke Airport
(1935–37; Grade II*)

=== Inter-war office, commercial & industrial buildings ===
Liverpool born Herbert James Rowse designed some of the most notable office buildings between the world wars, with Arnold Thornely in 1924–32 India Buildings & 1927–32 Martins Bank Building built as the headquarters of Martins Bank, also he designed Philharmonic Hall, Liverpool opened in 1939, and the architectural elements of the Queensway Tunnel 1925–31. His style is Stripped Classicism with occasional Art Deco elements. Another office complex is Exchange Flags by Gunton and Gunton, the first phase completed 1939, with World War II raging the basement was adapted in 1941 to house Commander-in-Chief, Western Approaches (now the Western Approaches Museum), and only completed in 1955 after construction paused during the war, it replaced a Victorian building of the same name by Thomas Henry Wyatt that had been built (1864–67). A bank of the inter-war era was the former National and Provincial Bank, 7 Water street by Palmer & Holden in a classical style (1933–34). Another office building oh the period is the former Bank of British West Africa (c.1923) by Arnold. The former National Bank (c.1920), James Street was designed in a restrained classical style by T Arnold Ashworth & Sons. Yorkshire House (1929) in Chapel Street by T. Wainwright & Sons is a Portland stone office block. At the end of Dale Street no 151 built (1932) was built for the Blackburn Assurance Company designed by William P. Hosburgh. The former Co-operative building in a Moderne architecture style by Robert Threadgold in the office of A.E. Shennan, now student accommodation.

An important example of industrial architecture of this era is the Mersey Match Factory (1919–21), Garston, it is the first example in the UK of flat slab concrete construction, by engineer Sven Bylander, architects Charles Mewès & Arthur Joseph Davis. The Littlewoods Pools building 1938 probably designed by architect Gerald de Courcey Fraser is a striking art deco industrial building. The former Slaughterhouse, now Liverpool Meat and Fish Market (1929–31), Prescot Road, Tue Brook, was designed by the Corporation Surveyor Albert D. Jenkins.

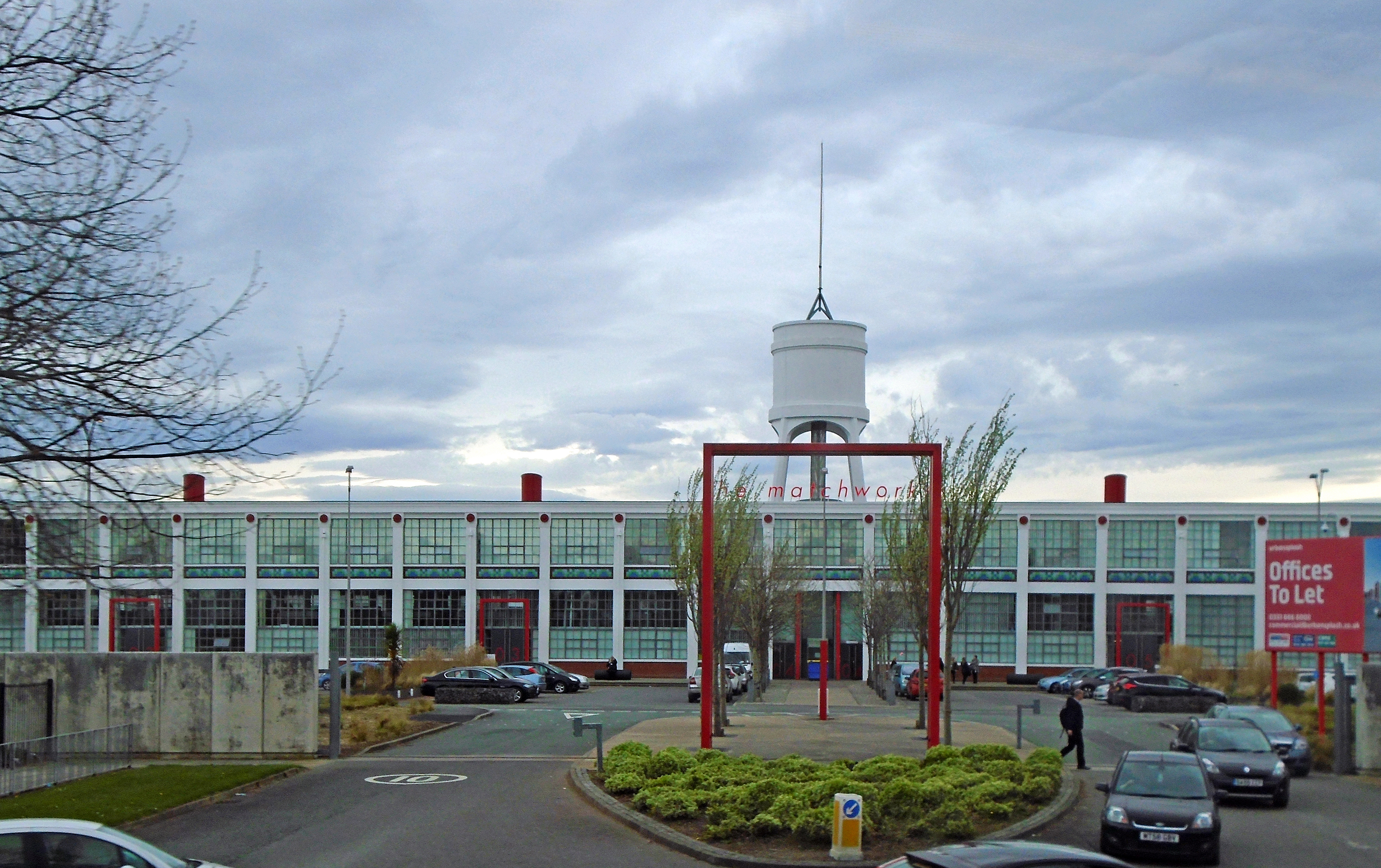
Former Mersey Match Factory, Garston
(1919–21; Grade II)

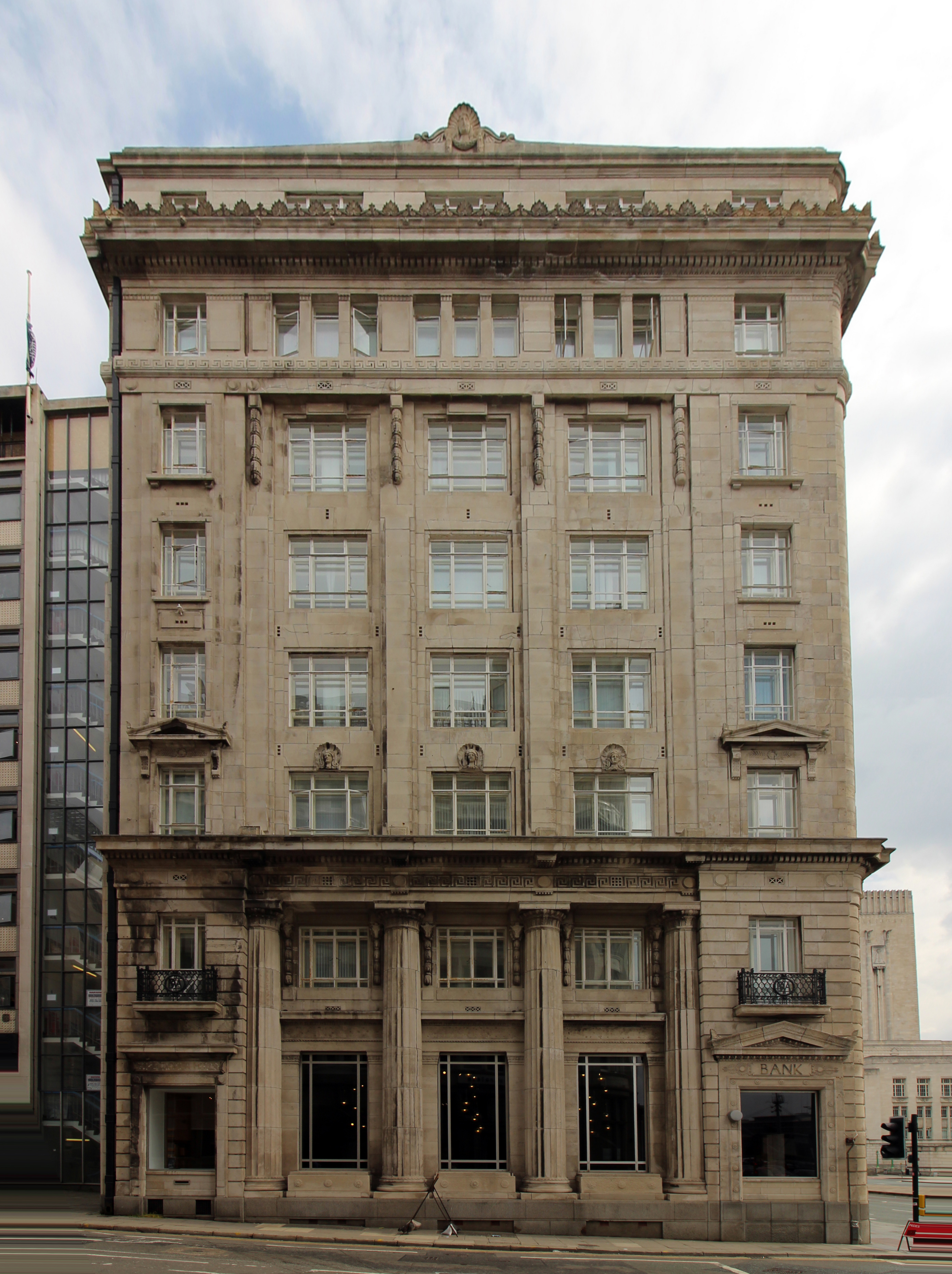
Former Bank of British West Africa, 25 Water Street
(c.1923; unlisted)

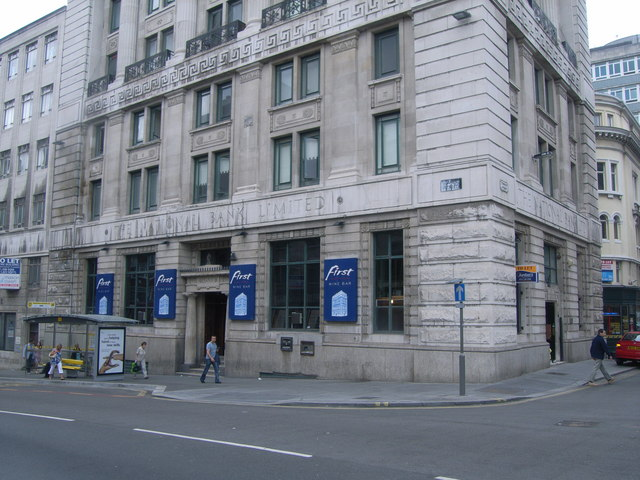
Former National Bank, James Street
(c.1920; unlisted)

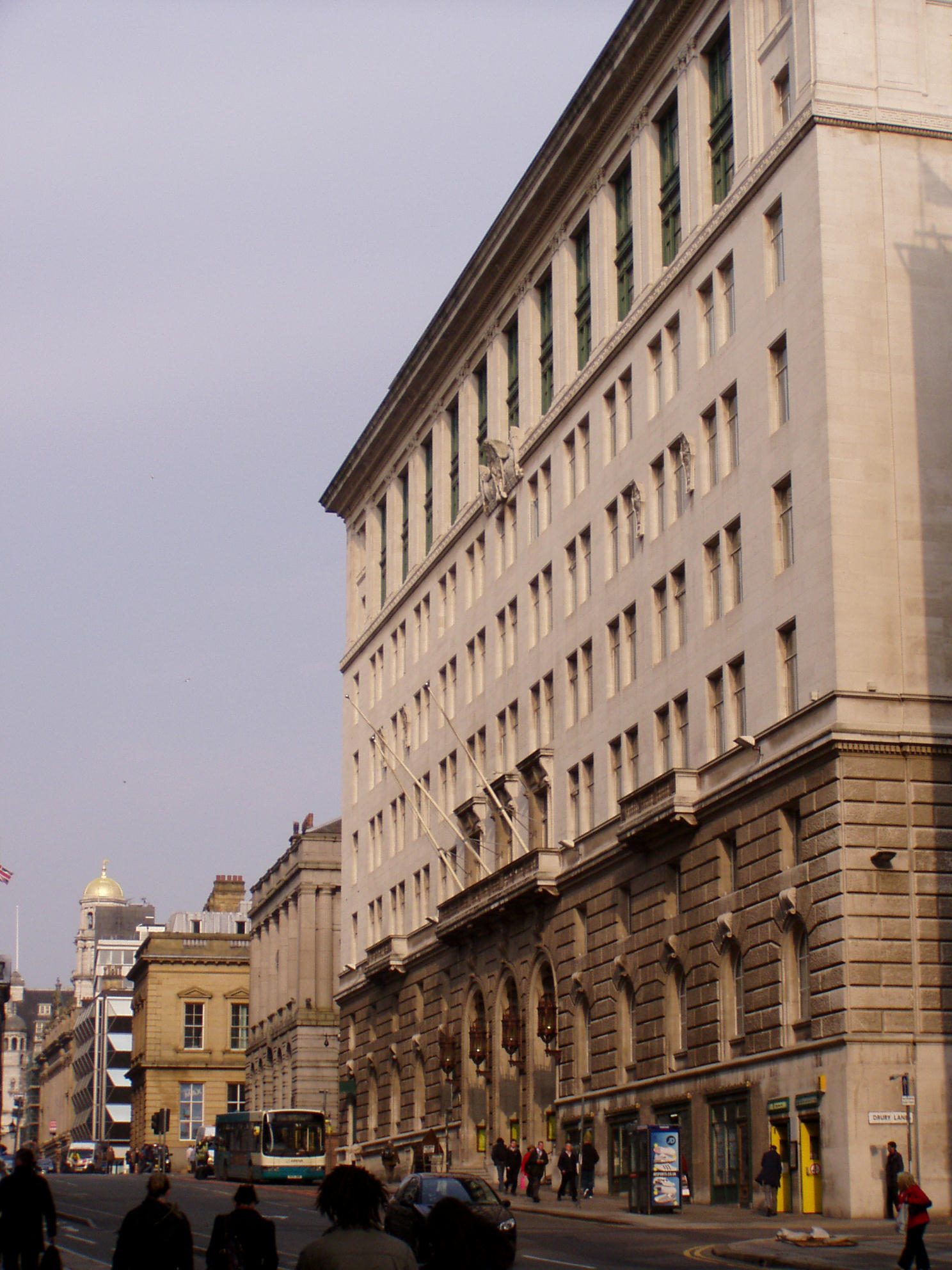
India Buildings, Water Street
(1924–32; Grade II*)

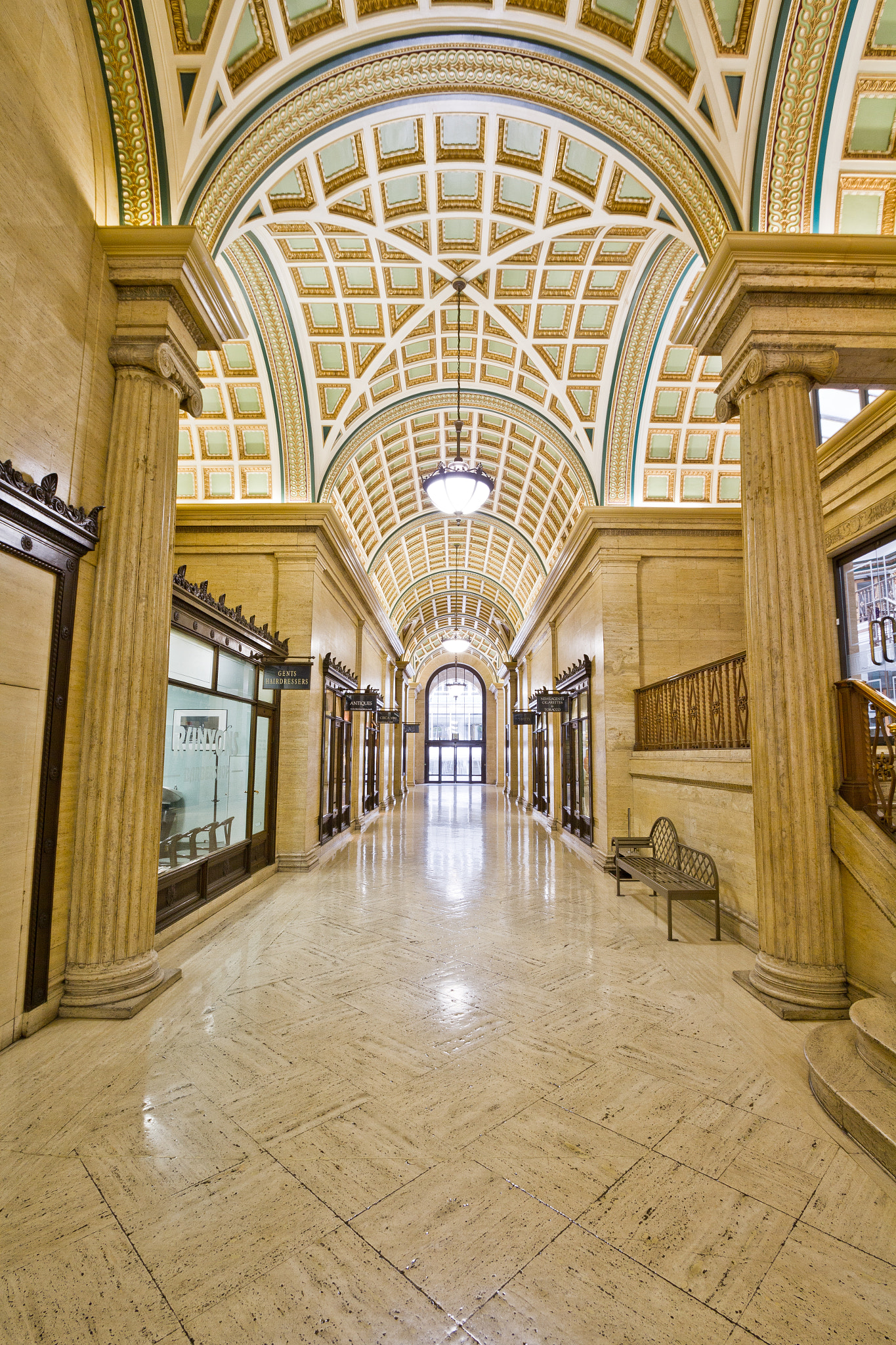
The arcade in the India Buildings
(1924–32; Grade II*)

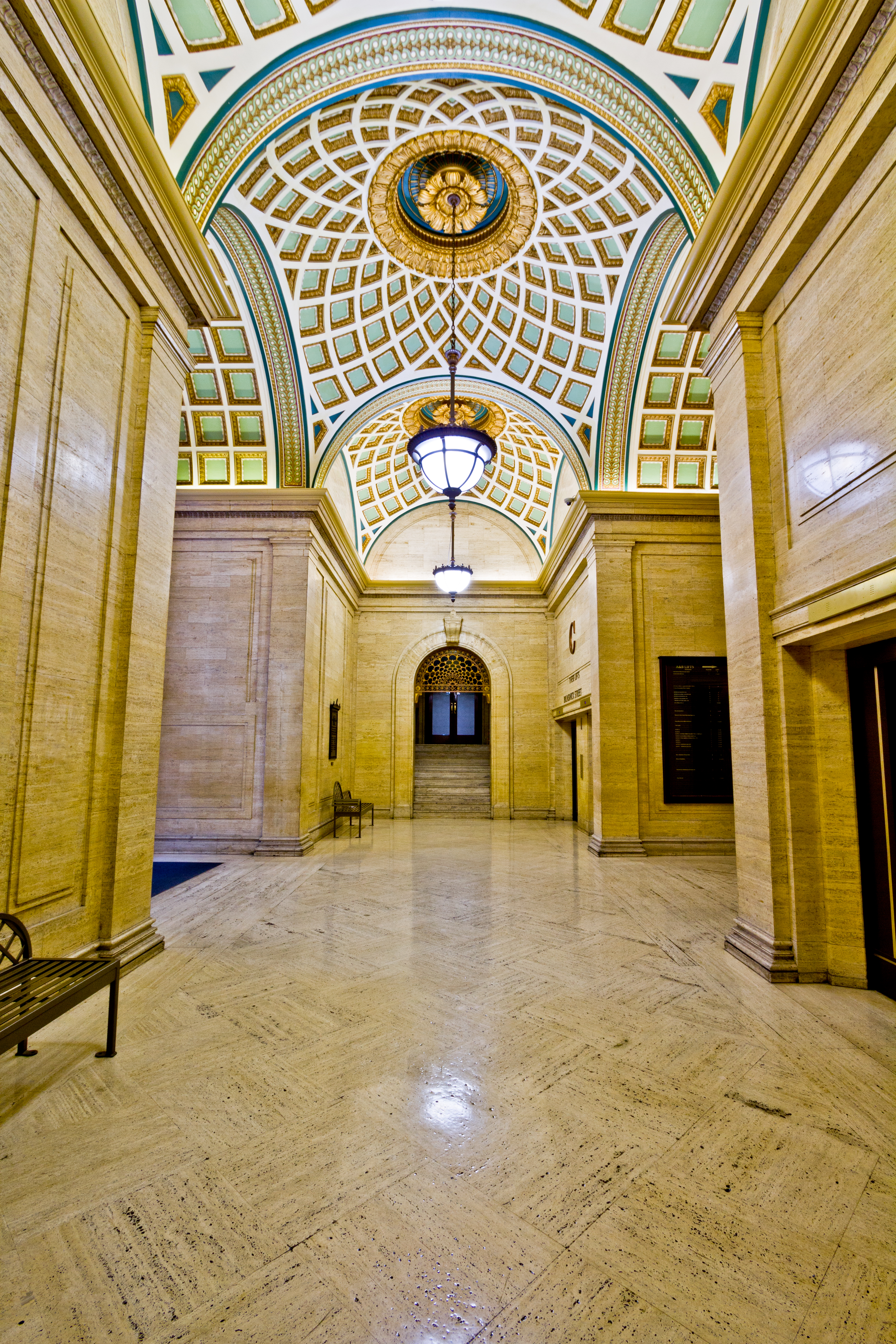
Lobby, India Buildings
(1924–32; Grade II*)

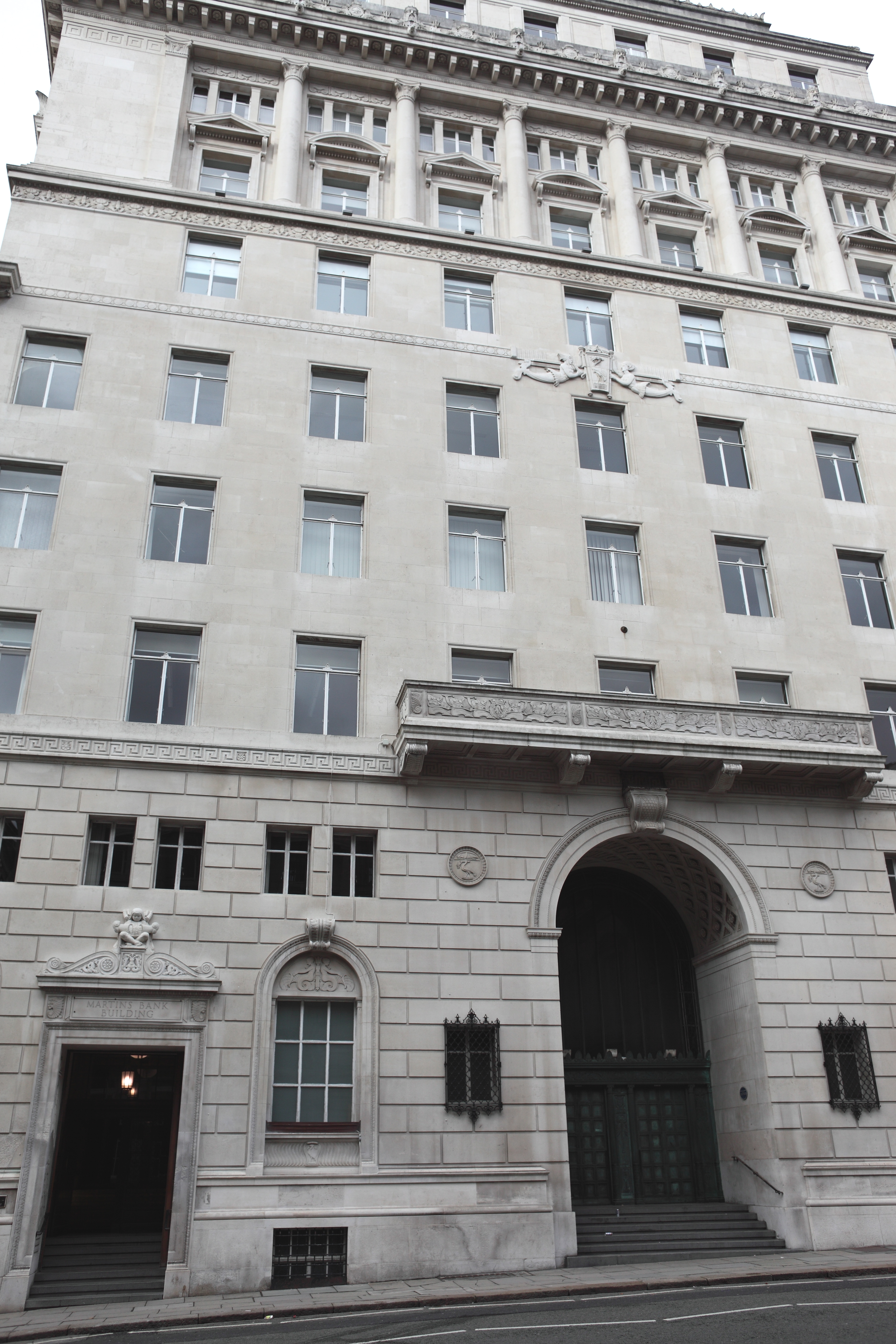
Former Martins Bank Building, Water Street
(1927–32; Grade II*)

=== Inter-war religious, school & university buildings ===
The University of Liverpool continued to expand during this era, the Jane Herdman Building for the geology department (1927–29) by Briggs & Thornely, in a Neo-Georgian style. The Harold Cohen Library, University of Liverpool was opened in 1938 and was designed by Harold Dod. A major school of the era is the former St Katherine's College (1927–30), by John Alan Slater (1885–1963) & Arthur Hamilton Moberly (1886–1952) of Slater & Moberly of London, now part of Hope University.

Churches of the inter-war period include the Church of England All Souls Springwood by Duncan A. Campbell & Ernest H. Honeyburne and the Roman Catholic St. Matthew's, Clubmoor by Francis X. Velarde (1930). All three architects were graduates of the University of Liverpool. The Church of St Christopher, Norris Green by Bernard A. Miller is built with hyperbolic arches. The Art Deco, grade II* listed orthodox Greenbank Drive Synagogue (1936) in the Greenbank Park area has recently closed and is now at risk in a "poor" condition. The Roman Catholic St Anthony of Padua, Queens Drive, Mossley Hill, by Anthony Ellis, is a large brick church.

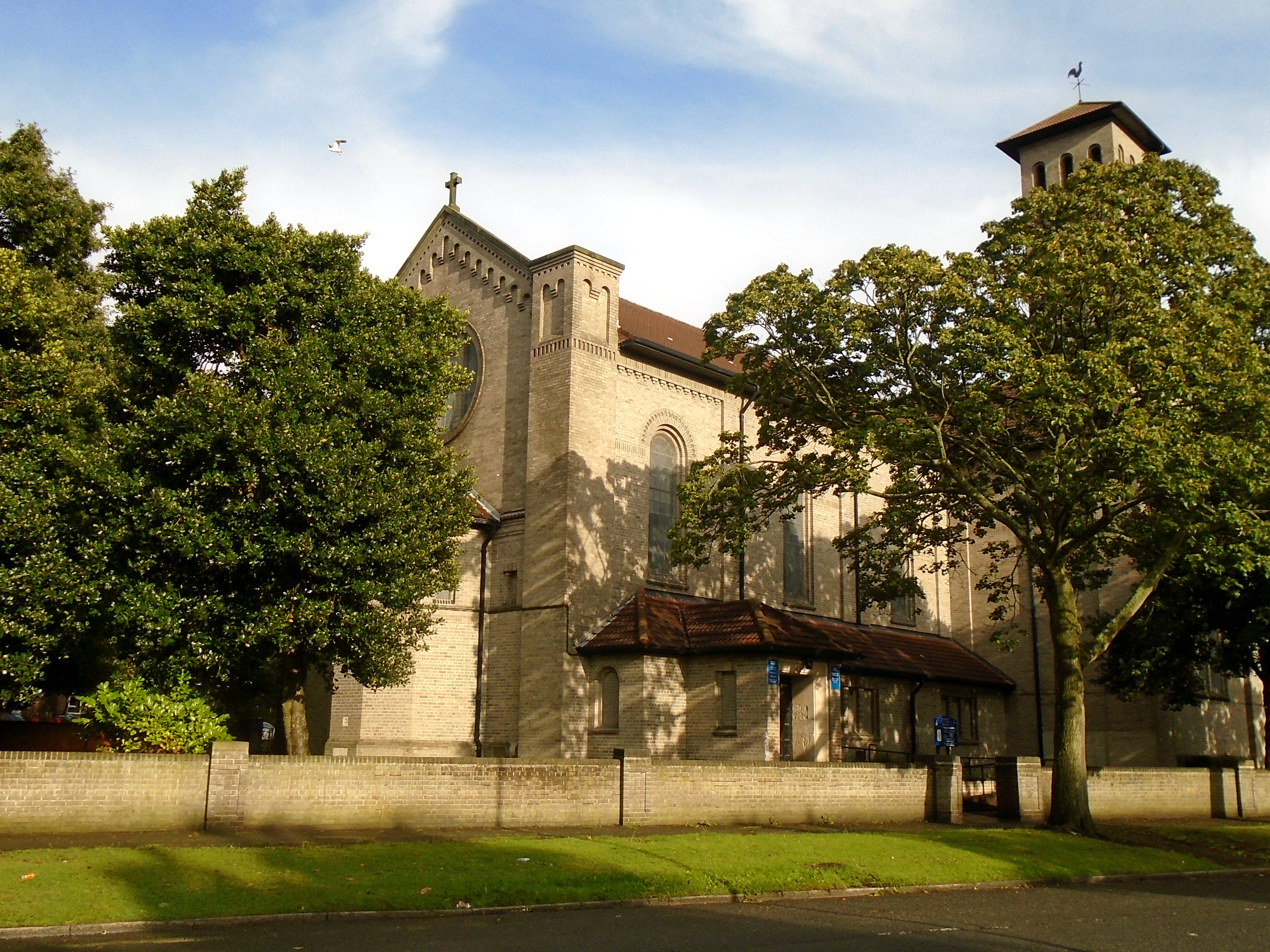
All Souls Church, Mather Ave, Springwood
(1925–27; Grade II)

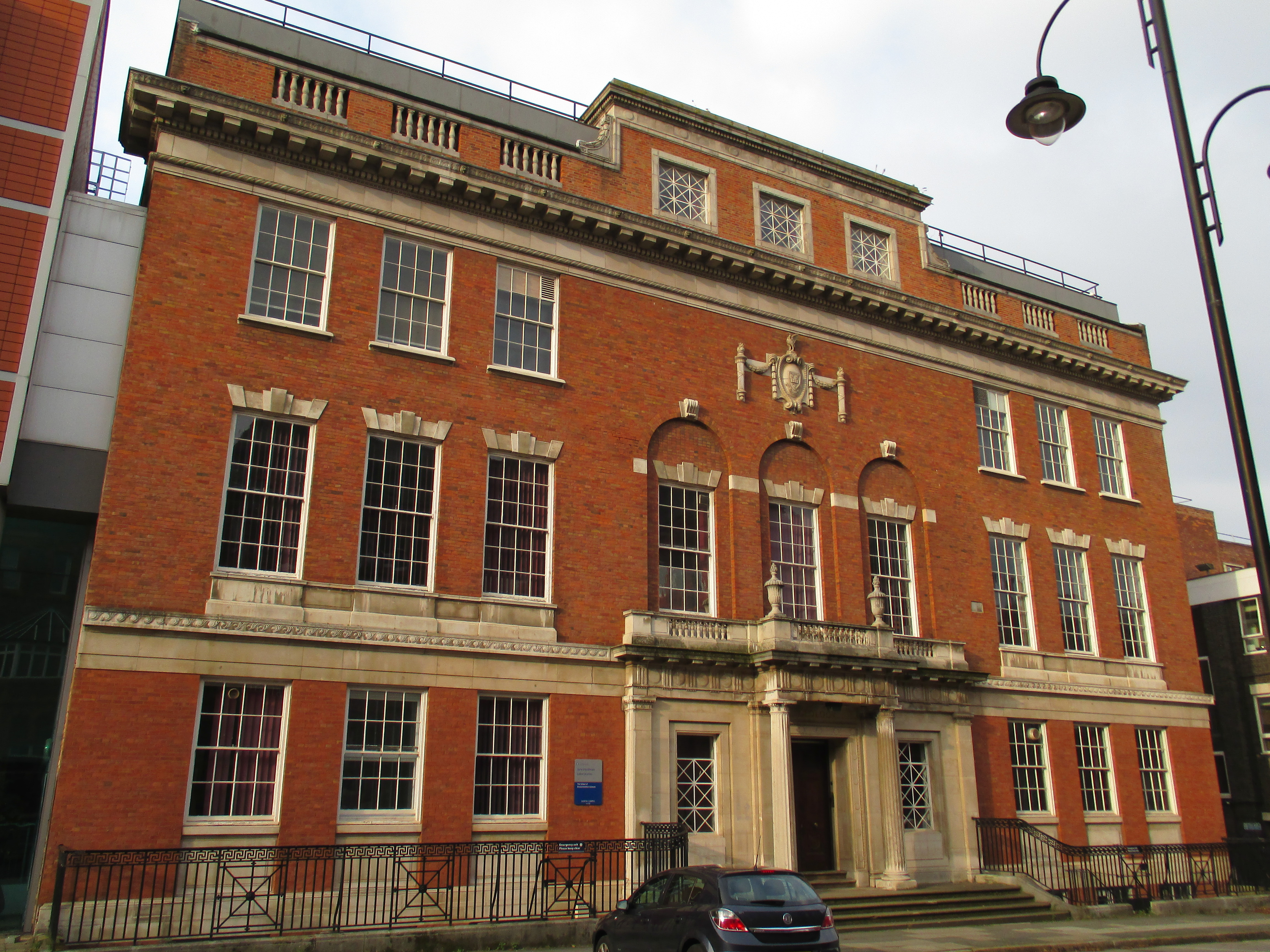
Jane Herdman Building, Brownlow Street, University of Liverpool
(1927–29; Grade II)

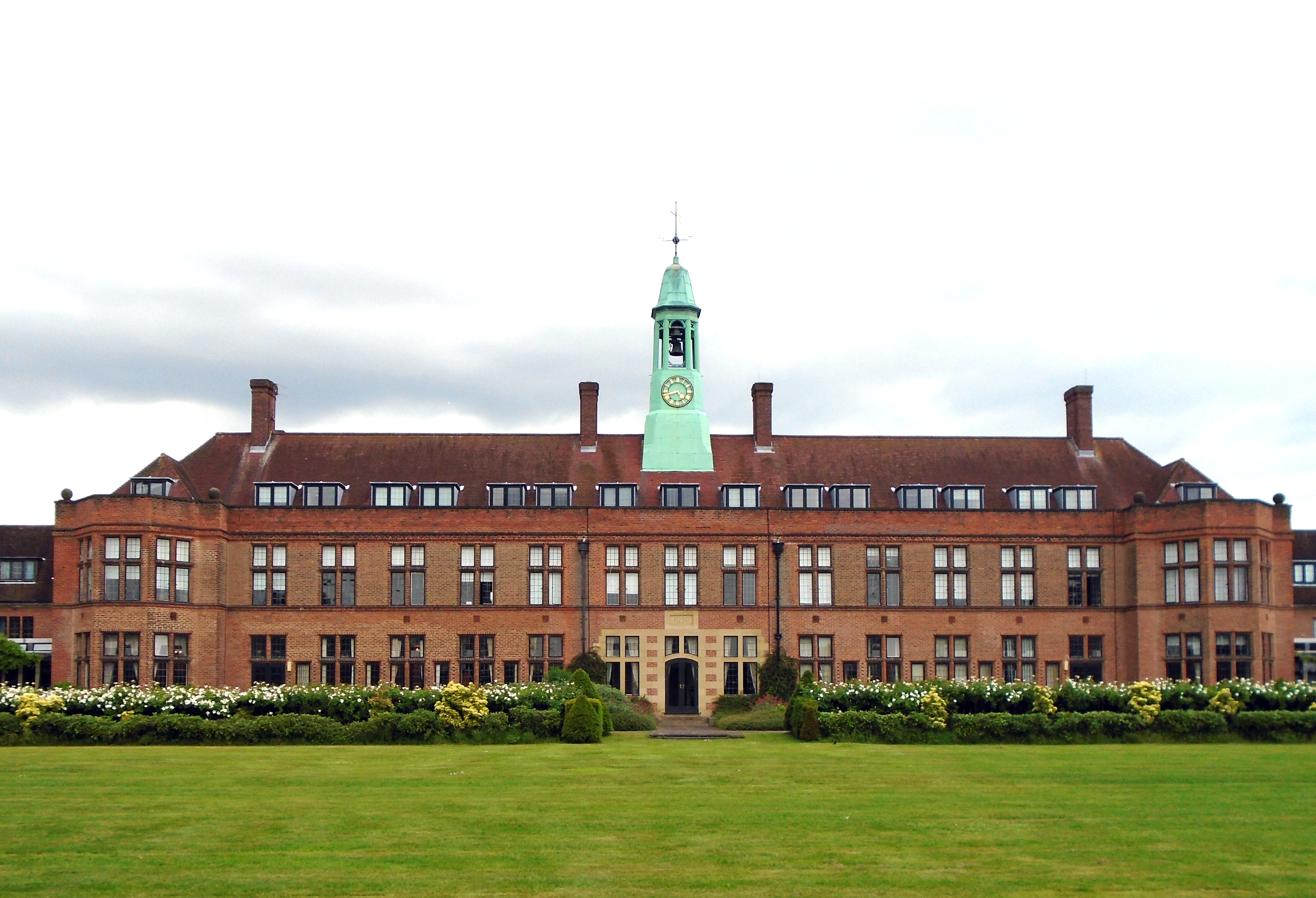
Former St Katherine's College, Hope Park, Taggart Avenue
(1927–30; Grade II)

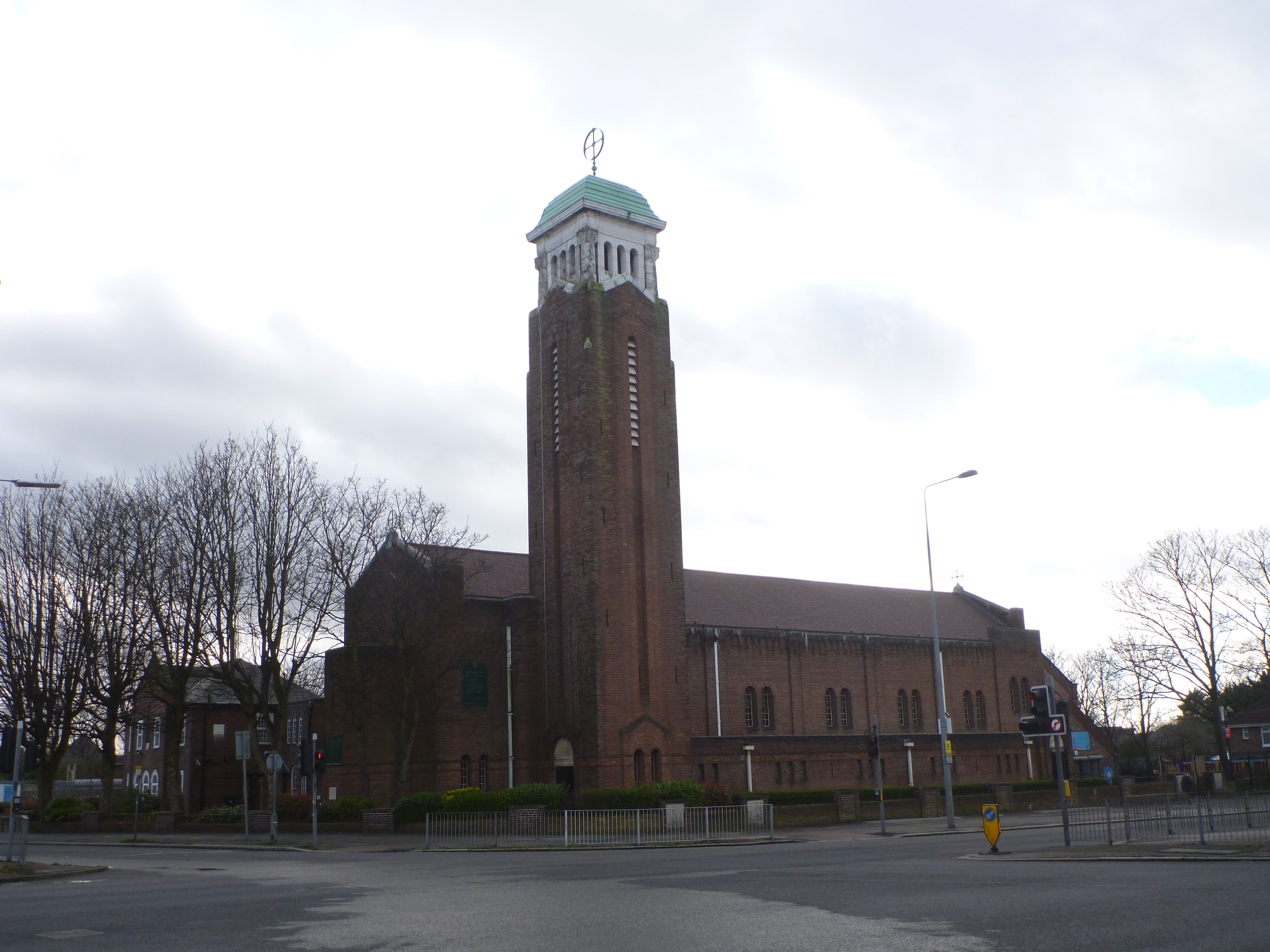
St Matthew's, Queens Drive, Clubmoor
(1930; Grade II)

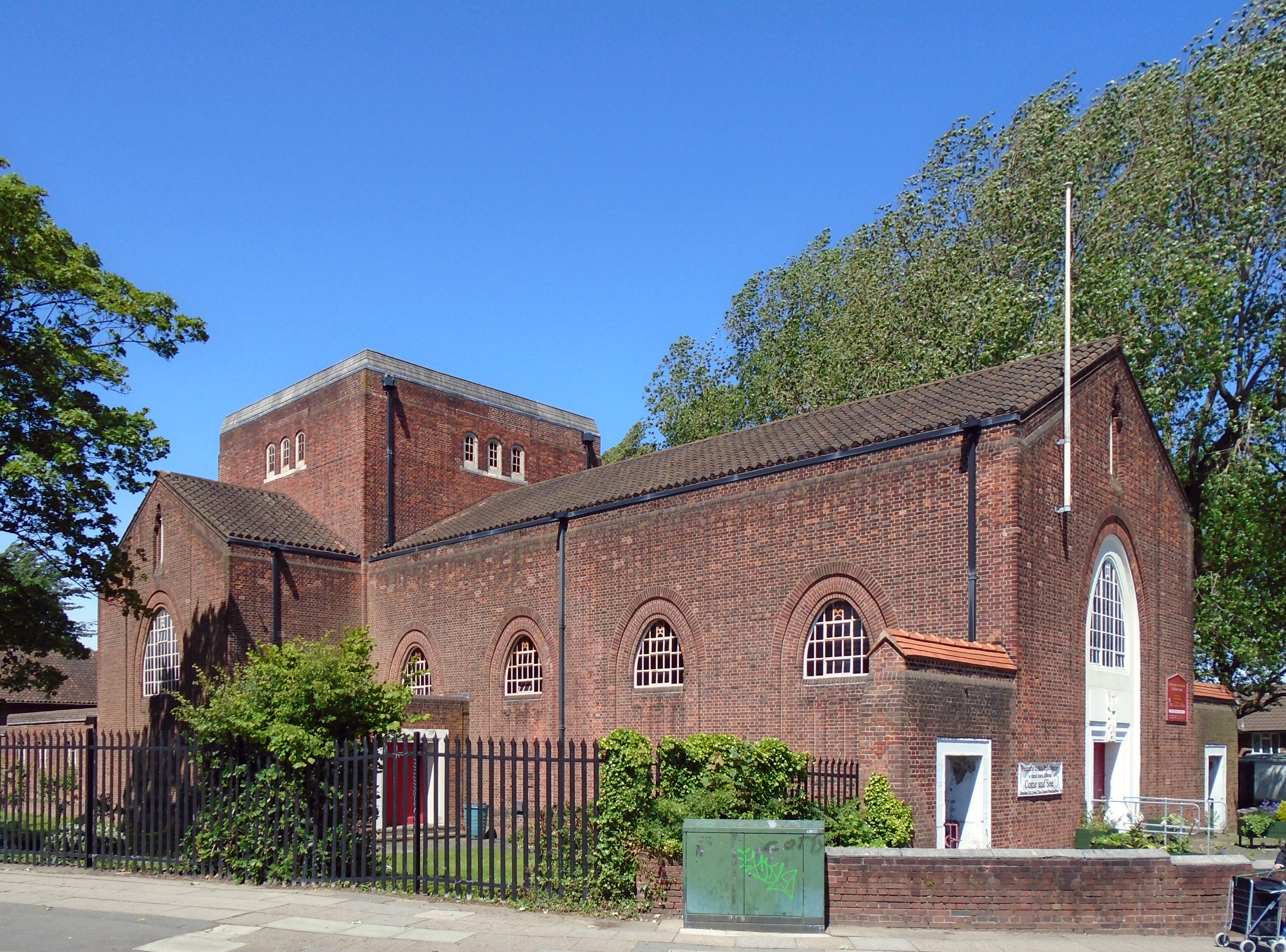
Church of St Christopher, Lorenzo Drive, Norris Green
(1930–32 Grade II*)

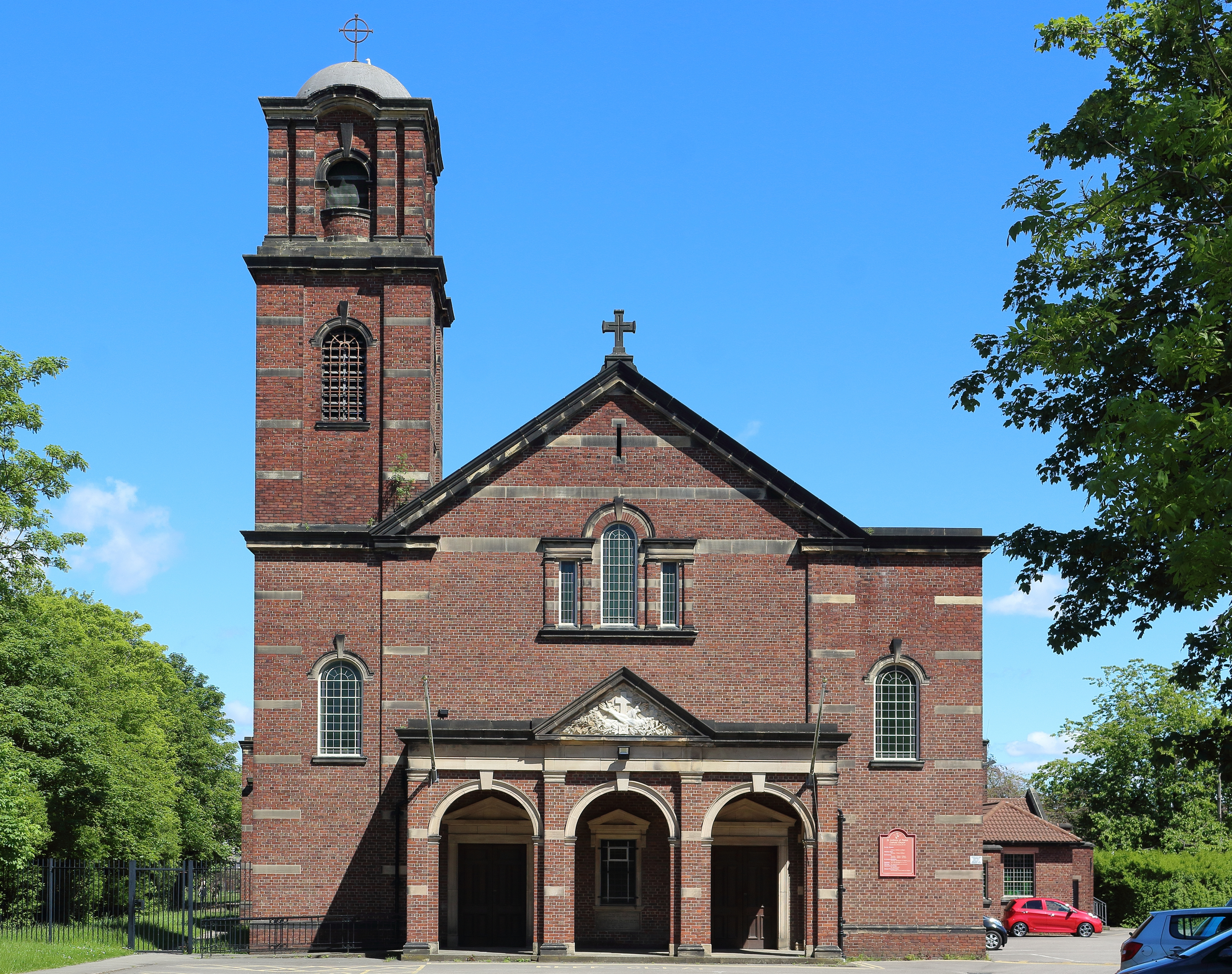
Church of St Anthony of Padua, Queens Drive, Mossley Hill
(1931–32; unlisted)

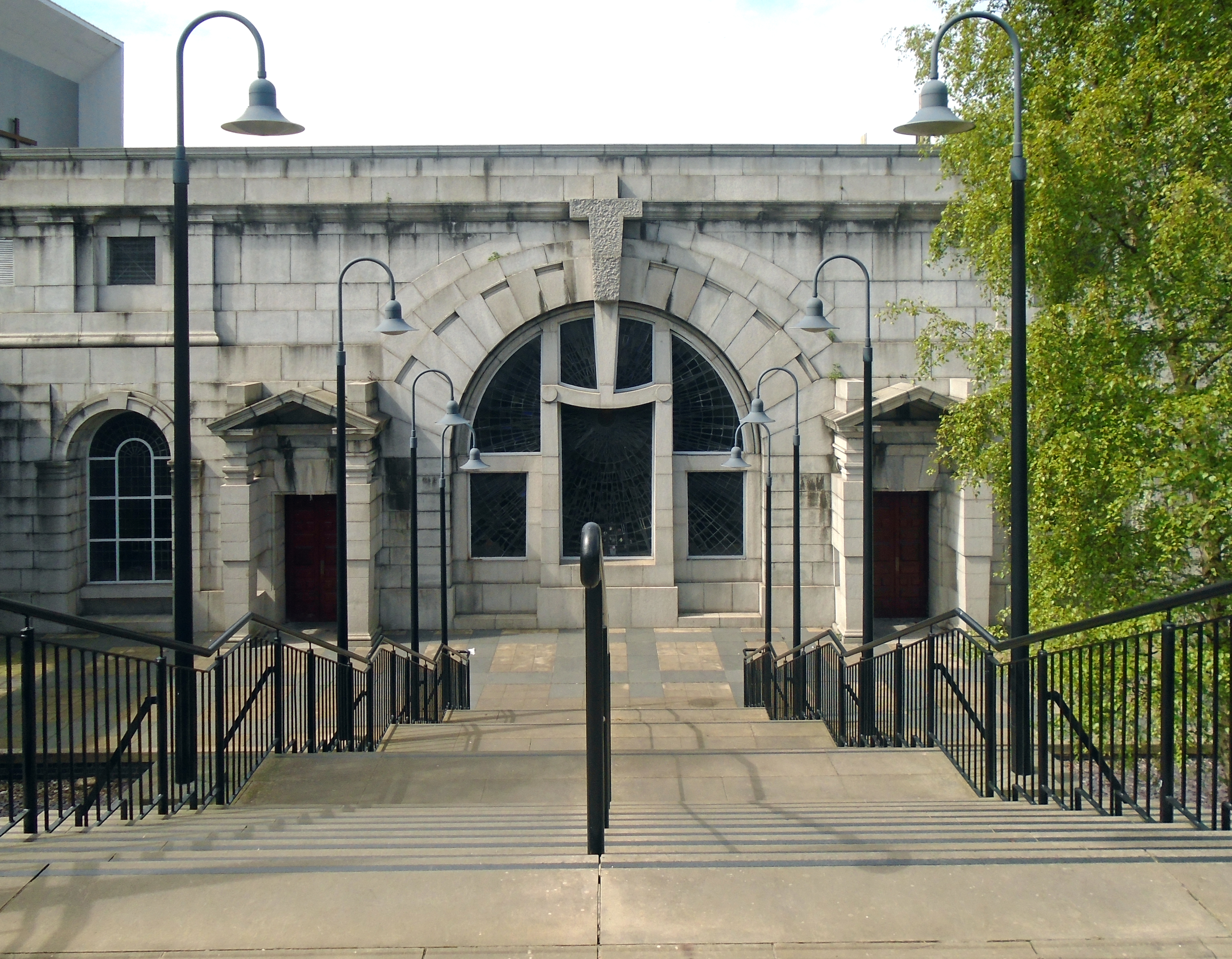
Liverpool Metropolitan Cathedral, the crypt
(1933–41 Grade II*)

=== Inter-war, public, cultural and entertainment buildings ===
Arnold Thornely extended and remodelled the interior of the Walker Art Gallery (1932–31). Liverpool Empire Theatre in a classical style (1924–25) designed by W. and T. R. Milburn built from Portland stone. The private members club the Liverpool Athenaeum was rebuilt in 1924 by Harold Dod. The Royal Court Theatre is also a notable example of Art Deco design from (1938) by J.B. Hutchins, in the same style is the former Forum Cinema, that was built 1931, to designs by William R. Glen. In 1931 the Liverpool Maternity Hospital was extended by Rees & Holt a new hospital the Liverpool Women's Hospital was built to replace it in 1995. The city's major concert hall the Philharmonic Hall (1936–39), designed by Herbert J. Rowse, the building has some art-deco decoration. Former Women's Hospital (1932), Catherine Street, neo-Georgian by Edmund Kirkby & Sons.

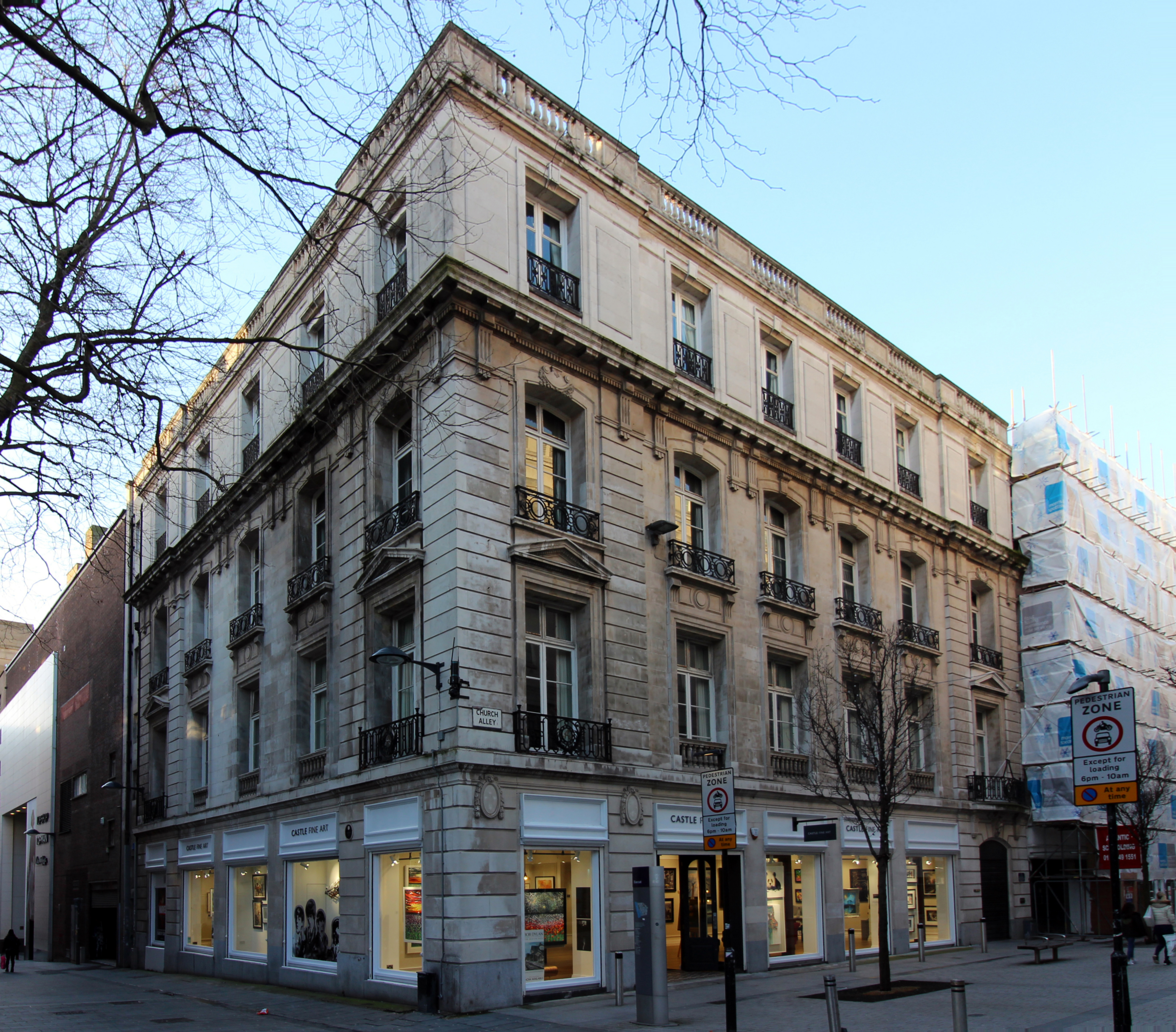
Liverpool Athenaeum, Church Alley
(1924; unlisted)

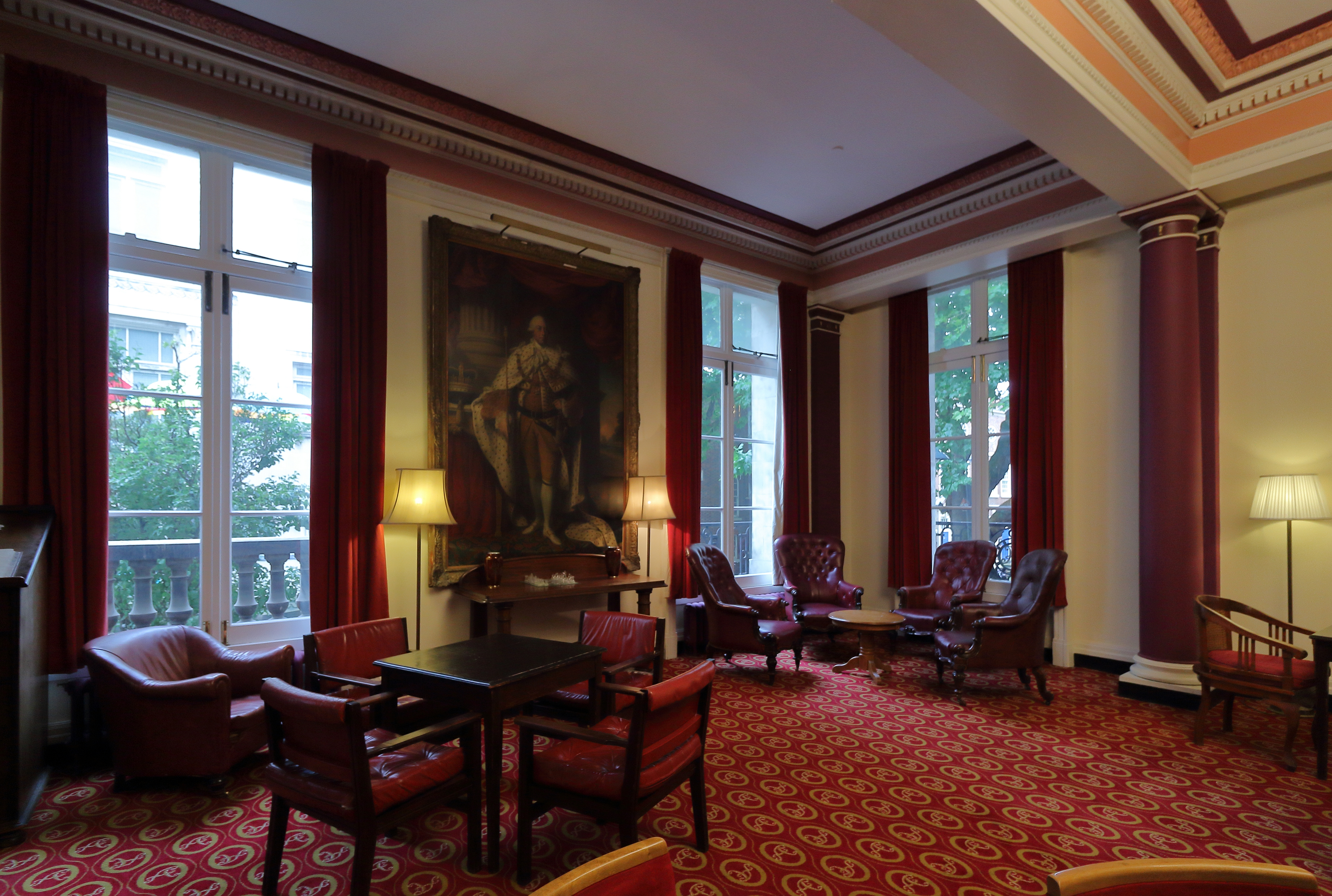
News Room, Liverpool Athenaeum
(1924; unlisted)

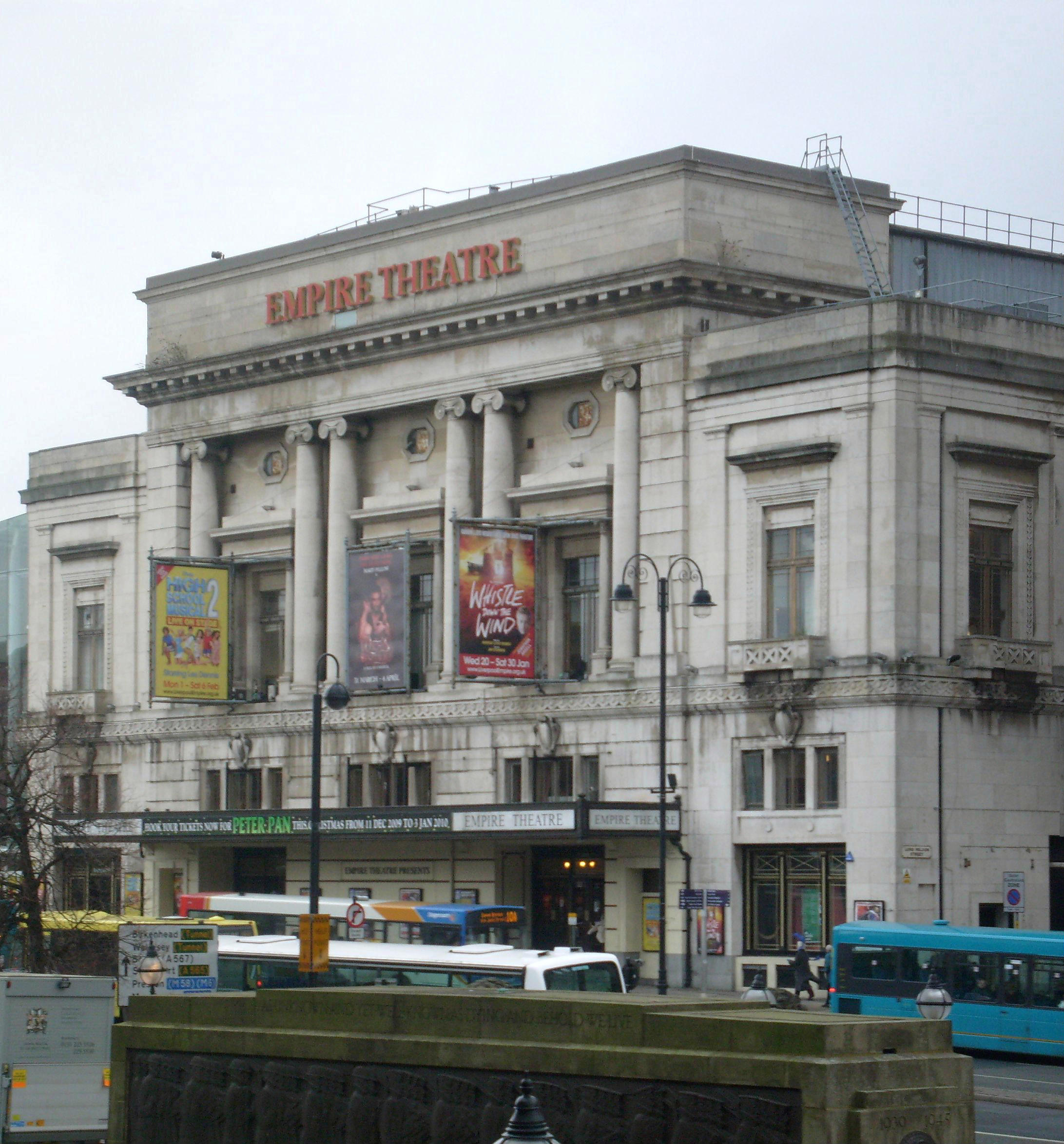
The Empire Theatre, Lime Street
(1924–25; Grade II)

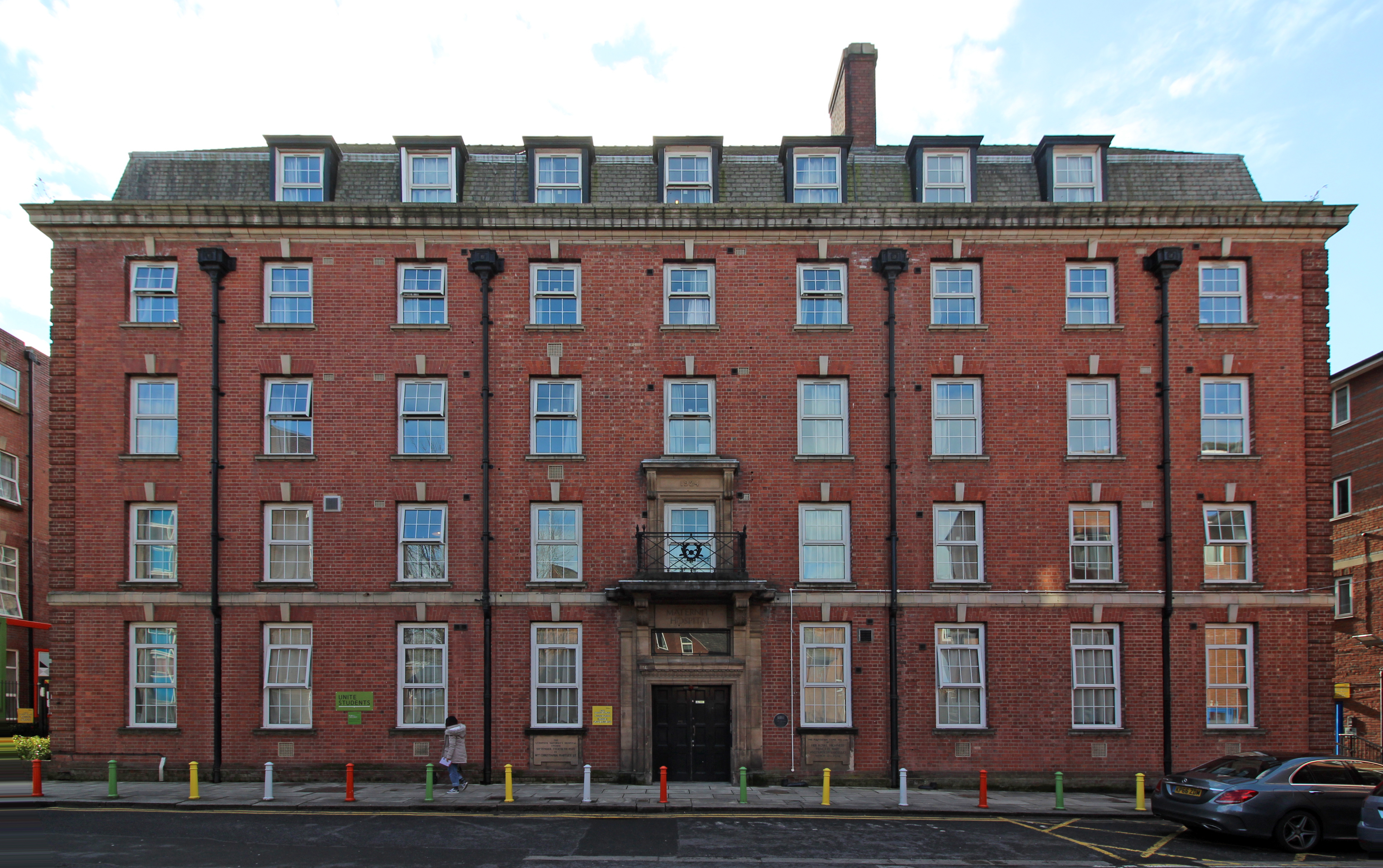
Former Liverpool Maternity Hospital, Myrtle Street
(1931; unlisted)

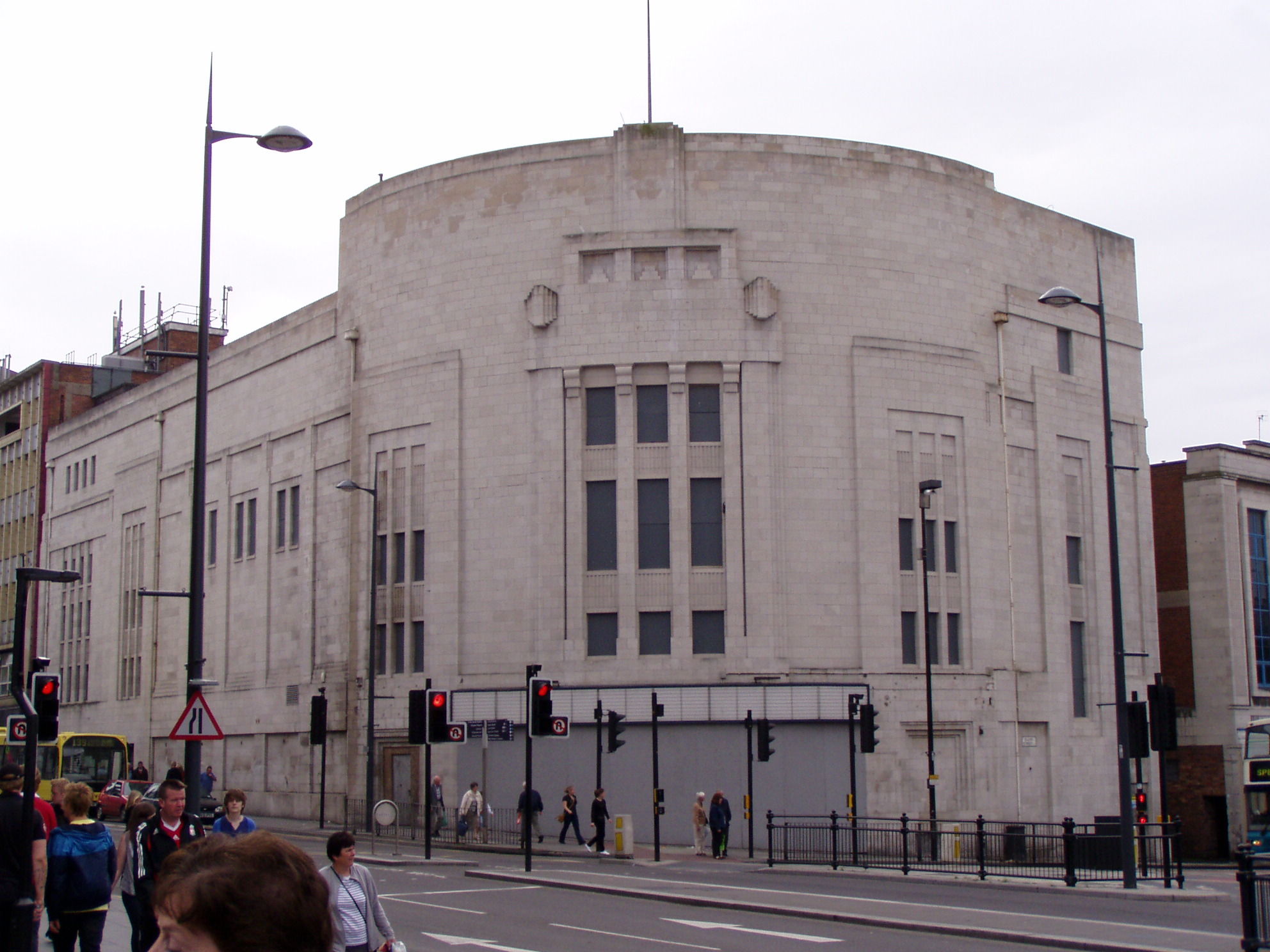
Former Forum cinema, Lime Street
(1931; Grade II)

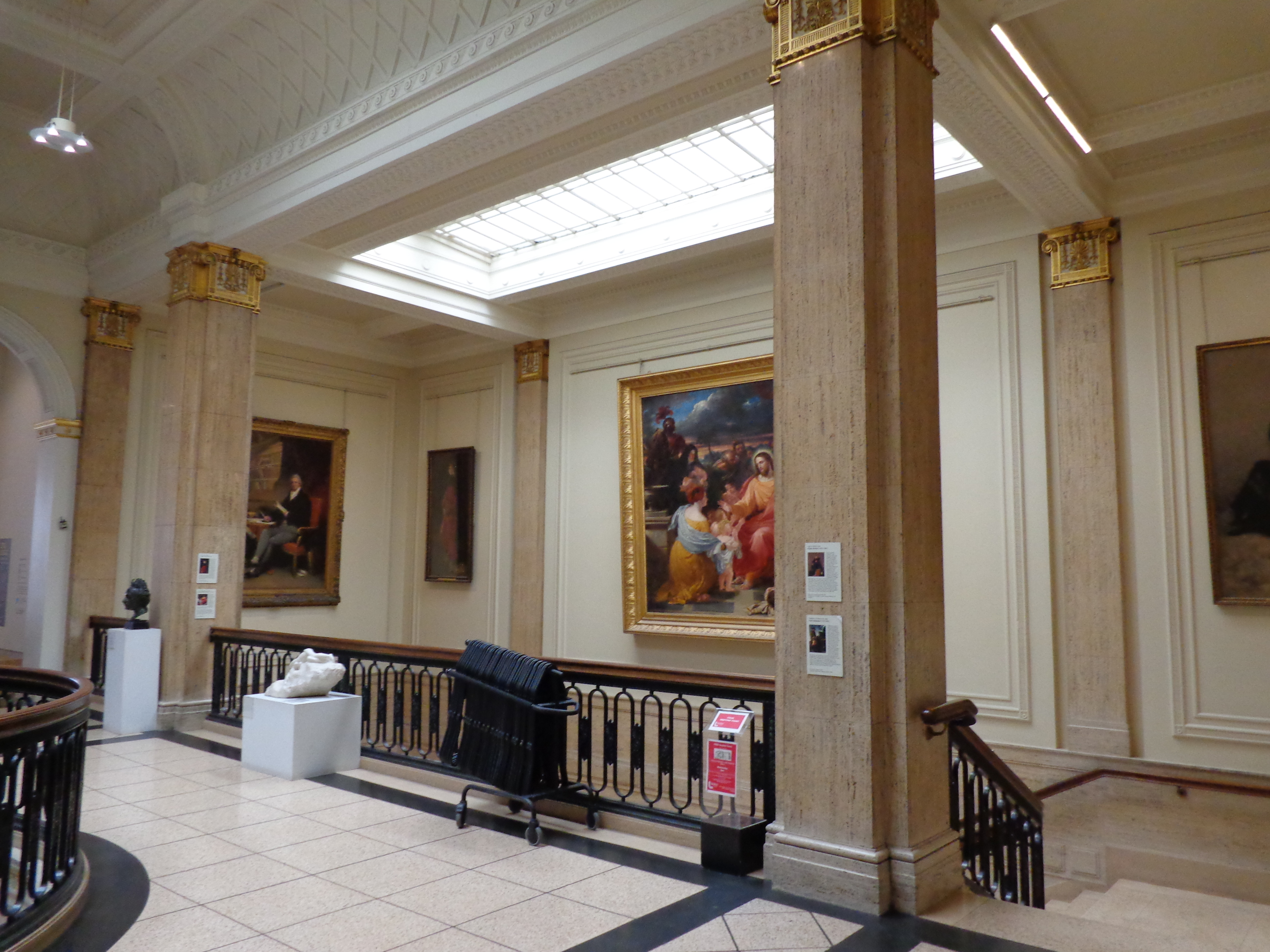
Main Staircase, Walker Art Gallery
(1931–32; Grade II*)

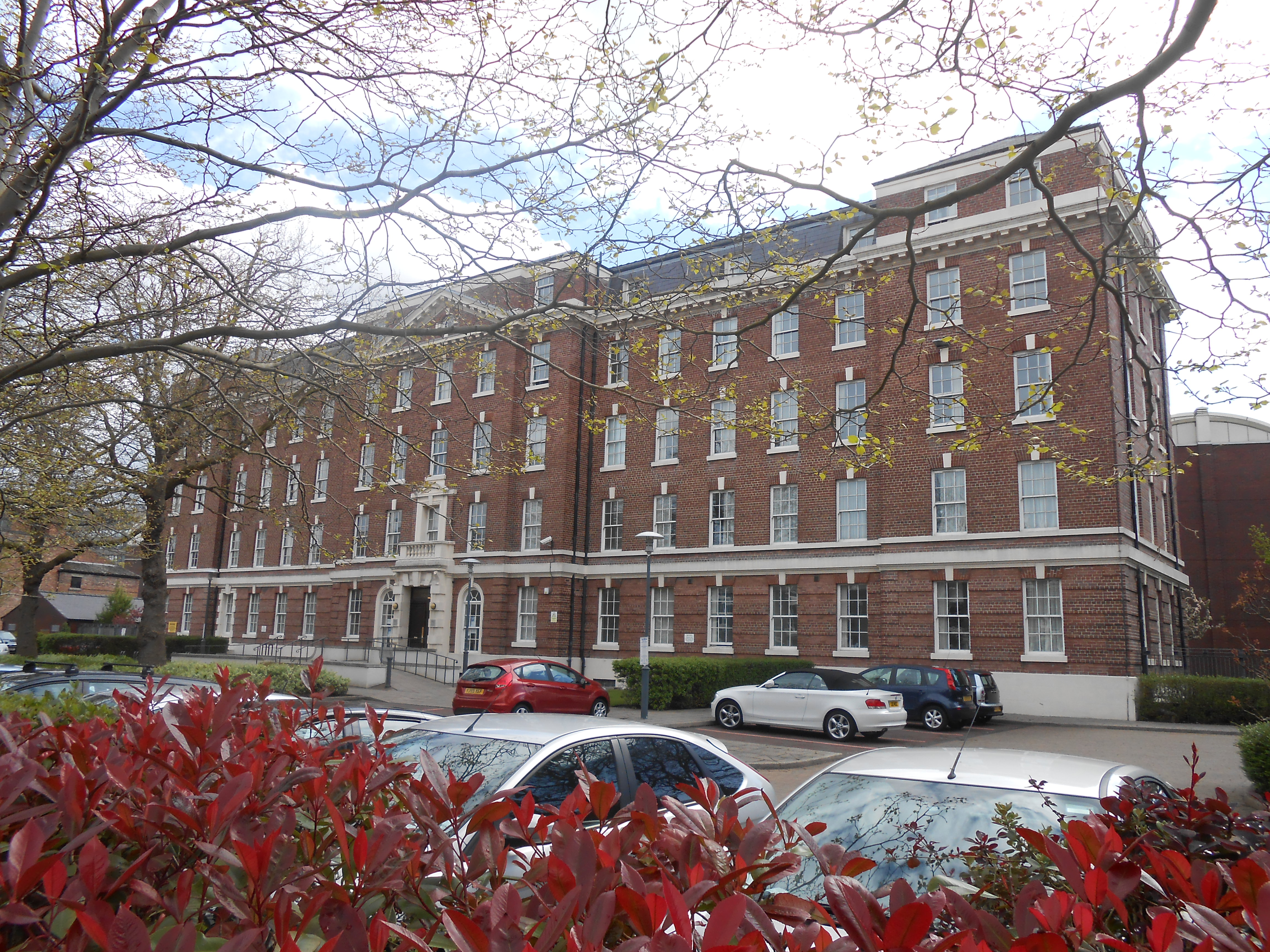
Former Women's Hospital (now Agnes Jones House), Catherine Street
(1932; unlisted)

=== Inter-war domestic buildings ===
A notable example of interwar council housing is St. Andrew's Gardens (1935) by the then director of housing Lancelot Keay & John Hughes, now used as student accommodation.

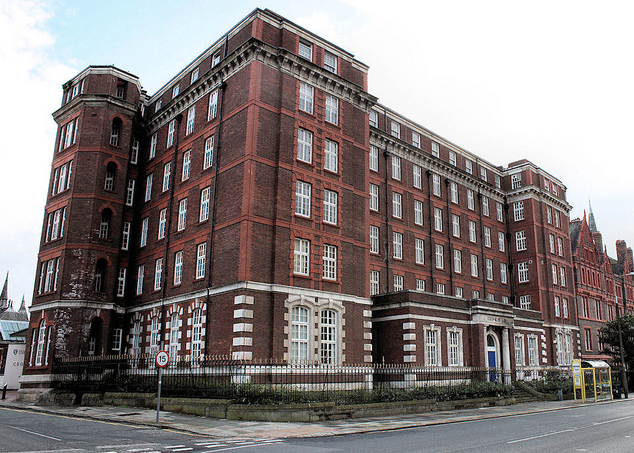
Former Nurse's Home, Liverpool Infirmary, Pembroke Place, now Cedar House, by Edmund Kirkby and Sons
(1923; unlisted)

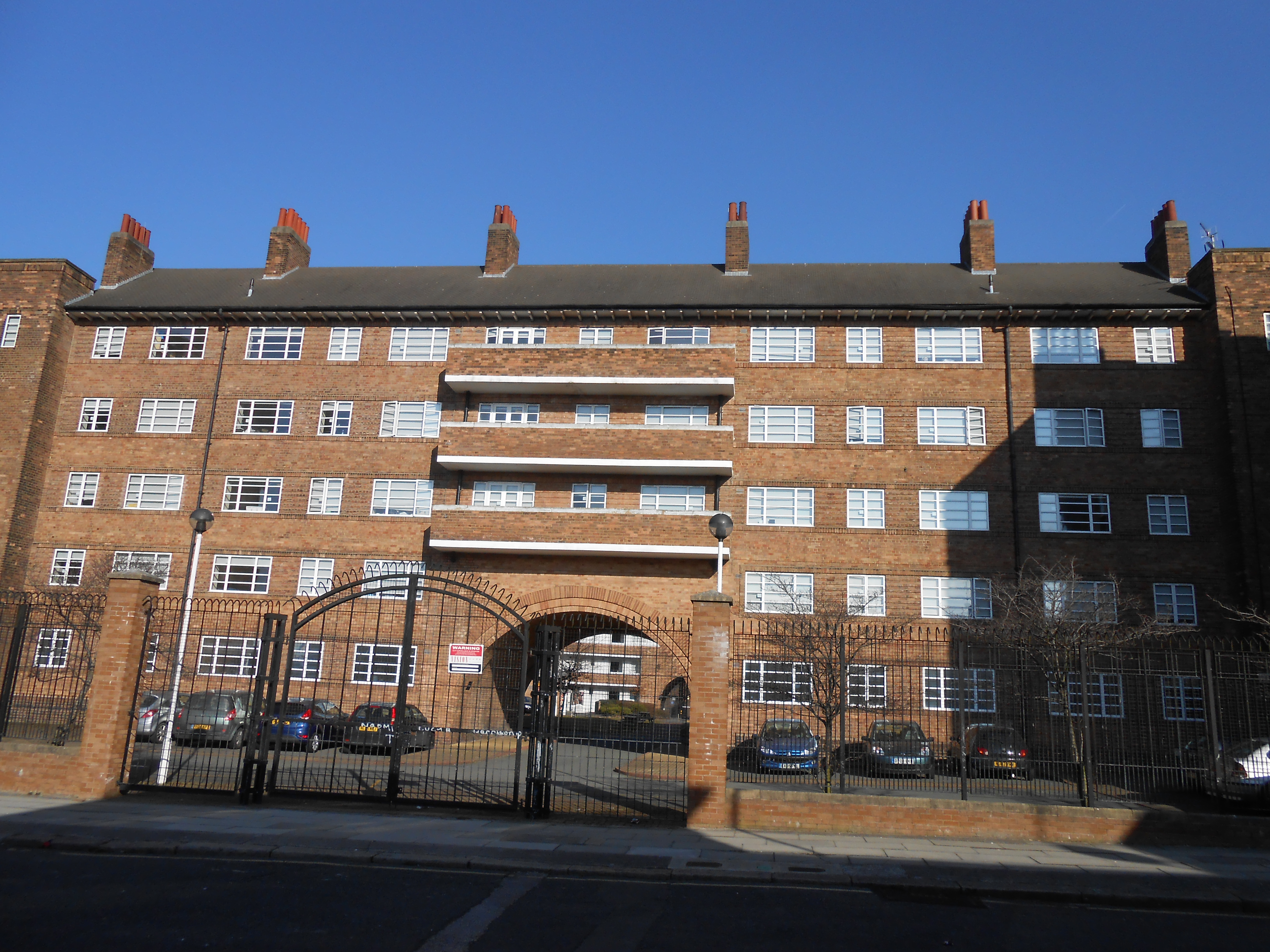
St Andrew's Gardens, by Lancelot Keay, John Hughes
(1935; Grade II)

== Post-war period and late 20th century (1945–1999) ==
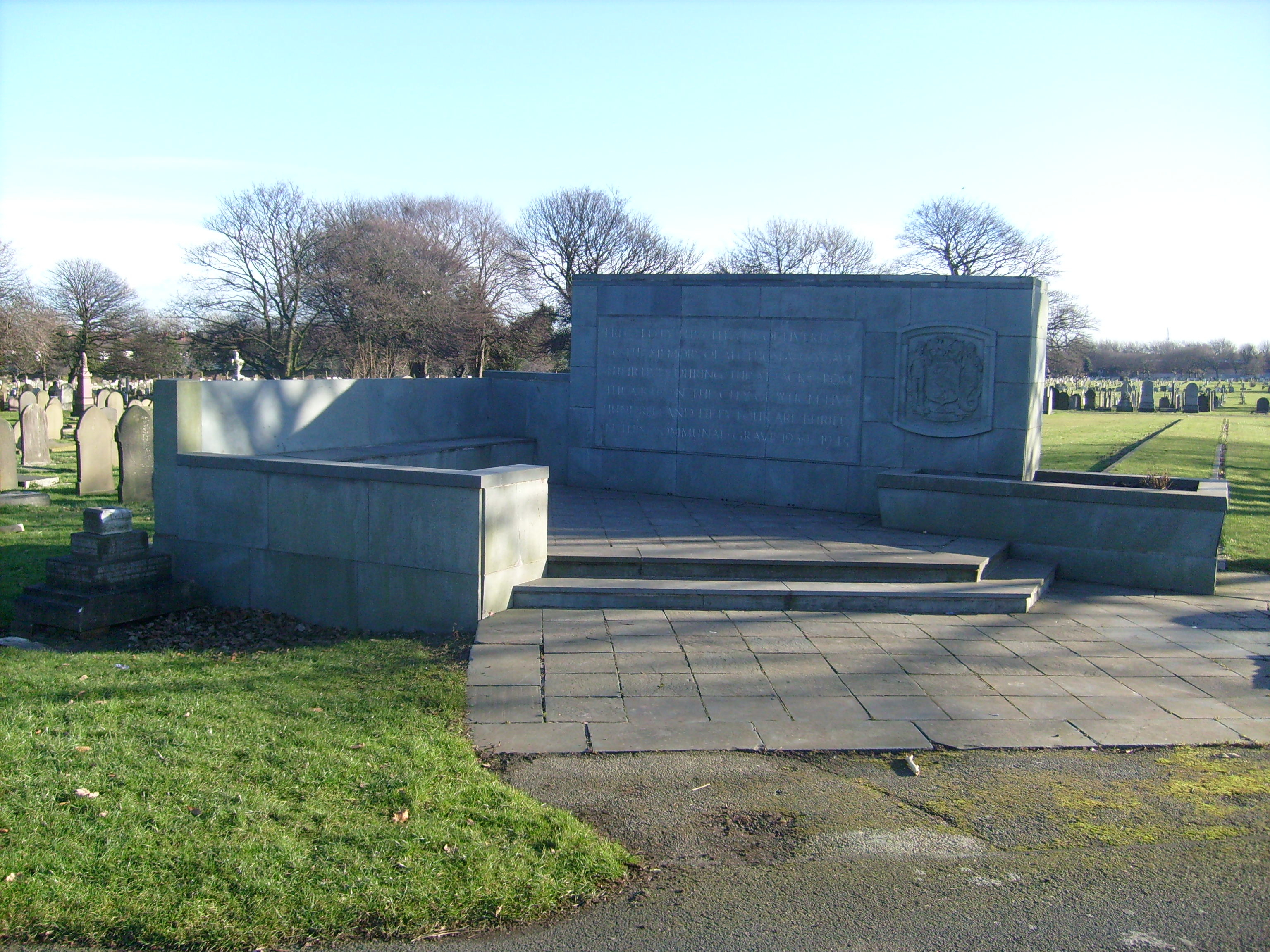
Memorial to the around 4,000 victims of the Liverpool Blitz, Anfield Cemetery, designed by Ronald Bradbury carved by H. Tyson Smith (1952)

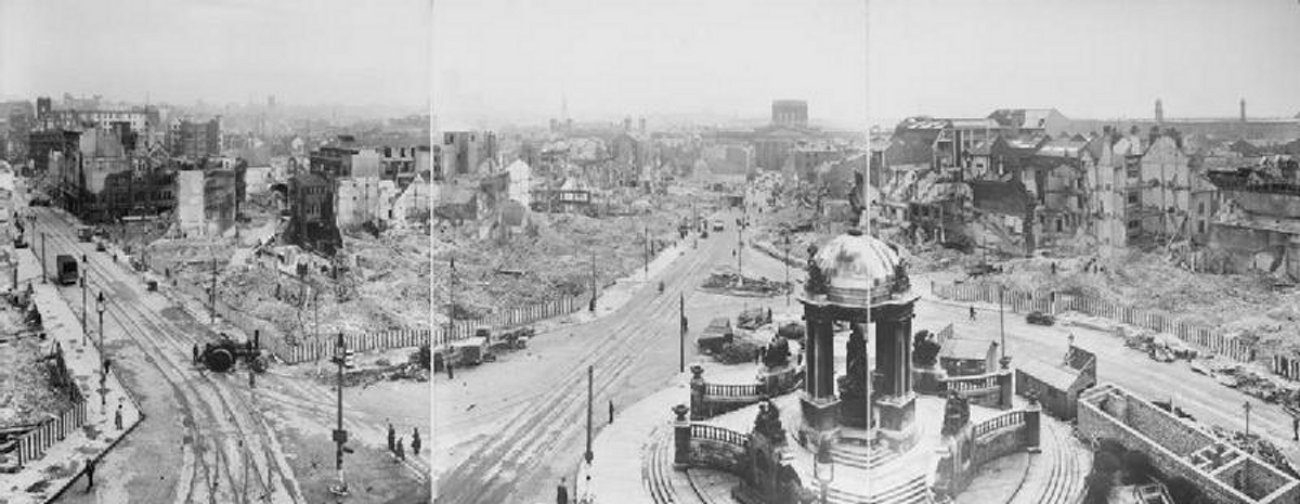
World War II bomb damage around Derby Square, with burnt-out Custom House in distance

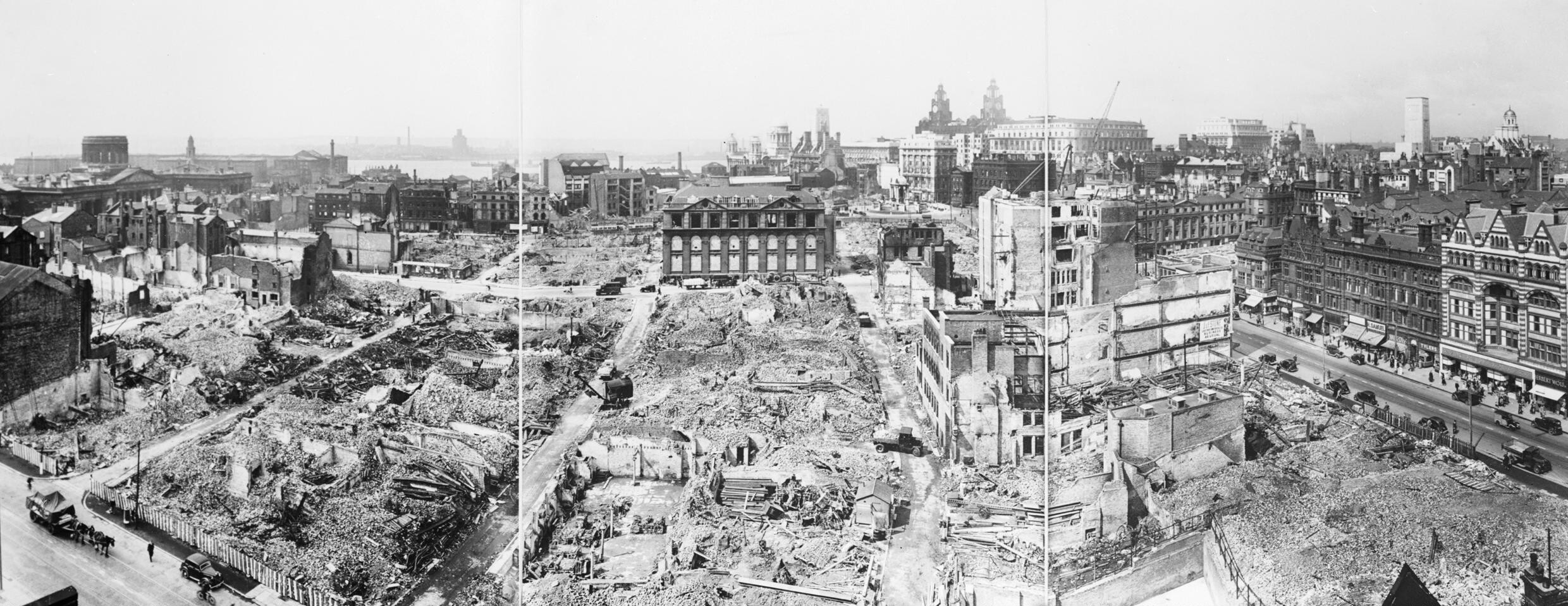
World War II bomb damage, showing the area to the west of Lord Street, burnt out Custom House far left

During the World War II Liverpool was a strategic target and was subject to the heavy aerial bombing known as the Liverpool Blitz, this resulted in extensive damage and destruction both of people and buildings. The greatest architectural loss was The Custom House, the then Liverpool Museum was gutted by incendiary bombs in 1941 and the interior rebuilt 1963–69 by the city architect Ronald Bradbury. In the centre of the city, the area south of Derby Square and Lord Street had been largely destroyed in the bombing.

After patchy rebuilding in the 1950s and early 1960s the Liverpool City Centre Plan was published (1965), created in consultation with Graeme Shankland & Liverpool City Planning Officer Walter Bor. This radical plan called for the demolition of two-thirds of the City Centre, due to the post-war economic decline of the city little progress was made. Merseyside Development Corporation was set up in 1981, this led to Liverpool International Garden Festival to help kick start the desperately needed regeneration of the still declining city, this led onto the restoration of the Albert Dock in the 1980s. The need for extra road capacity to link Liverpool to the Wirral led to the construction of the Kingsway Tunnel (1966–71). The M62 motorway constructed between 1971 and 1976 and M57 motorway 1972–74 would be a major addition to the city's transport links. The post-war period saw the construction of the city's last major dock Seaforth Dock, opened in 1971.

=== Post War 1950s buildings ===
During this decade Modern architecture made little progress in Liverpool, pre-war Stripped Classicism still being in vogue. One of the first buildings erected to replace a building destroyed in the blitz, was the department store Lewis's, erected 1947–56, designed by Gerald de Courcy Fraser. Of a similar style is Pearl Assurance House (c.1954–55), 2 Derby Square, by Alfred Shennan & Partners. Continuing the pre-war Neo-Georgian style is Reliance House (1954–56) in Water Street by Morter & Dobie. The interior of St Oswald's Church, Old Swan was rebuilt internally (1951–57) by Adrian Gilbert Scott.

Tate & Lyle Sugar Silo in the northern docks is a bold example of post-war industrial architecture by Tate and Lyle's Engineering Department and constructed by Cementation Ltd. Reinforced concrete with pre-stressed concrete floor with a Parabolic tunnel vault (1955–57).

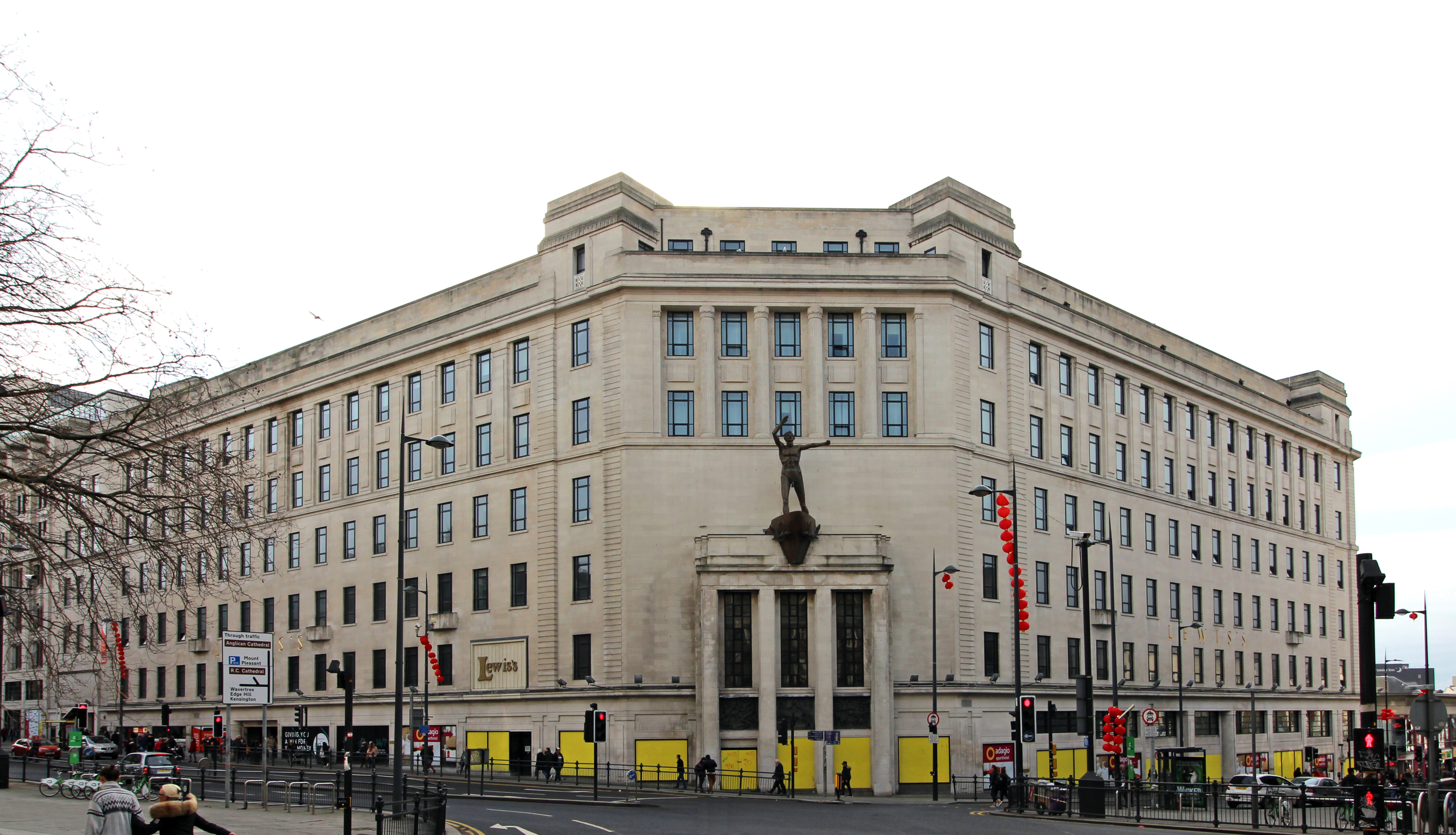
Former Lewis's department store
(1947–56; Grade II)

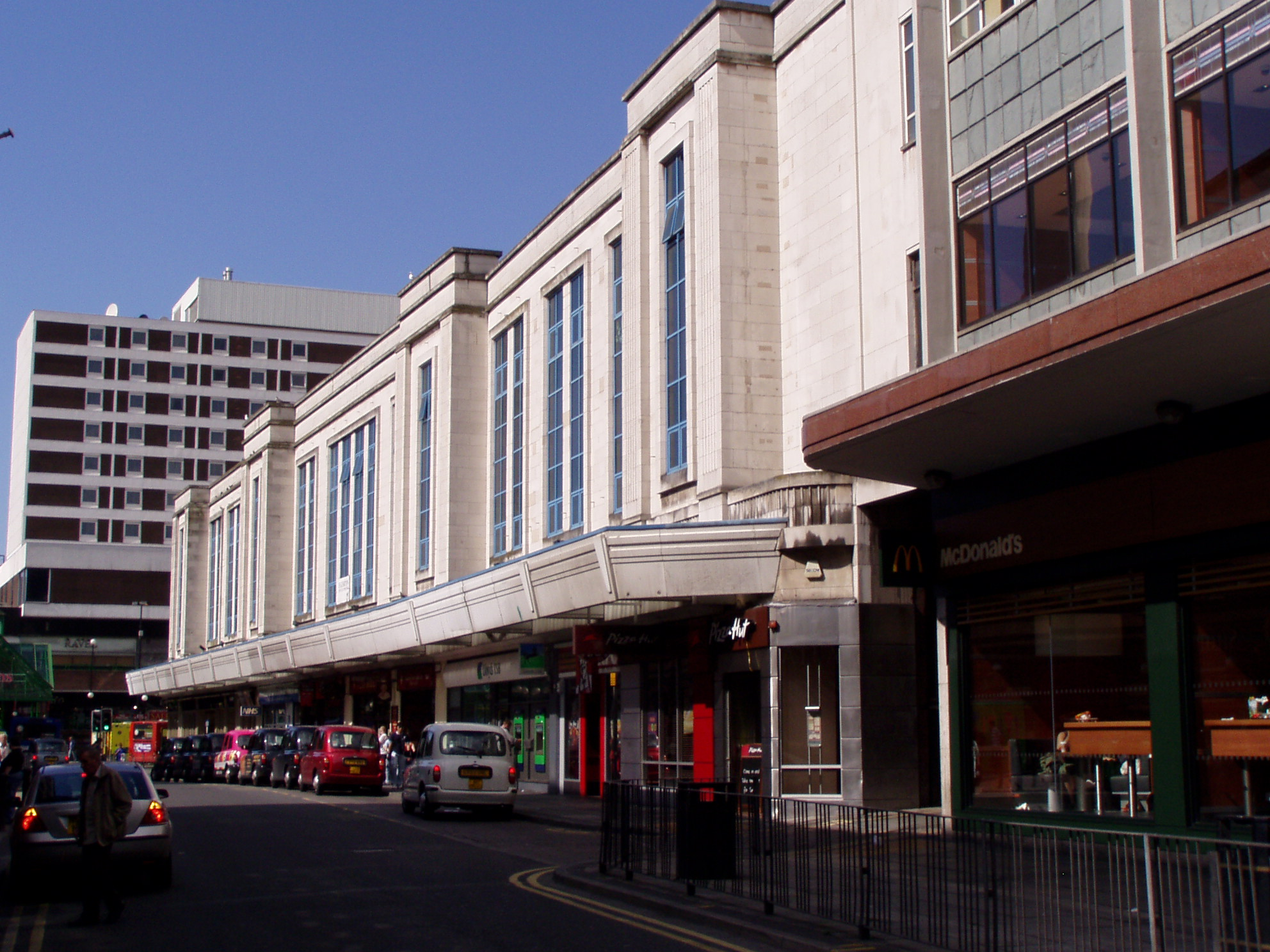
Former Blackler's Department Store, Great Charlotte Street
(bombed 1941, reopened 1953)

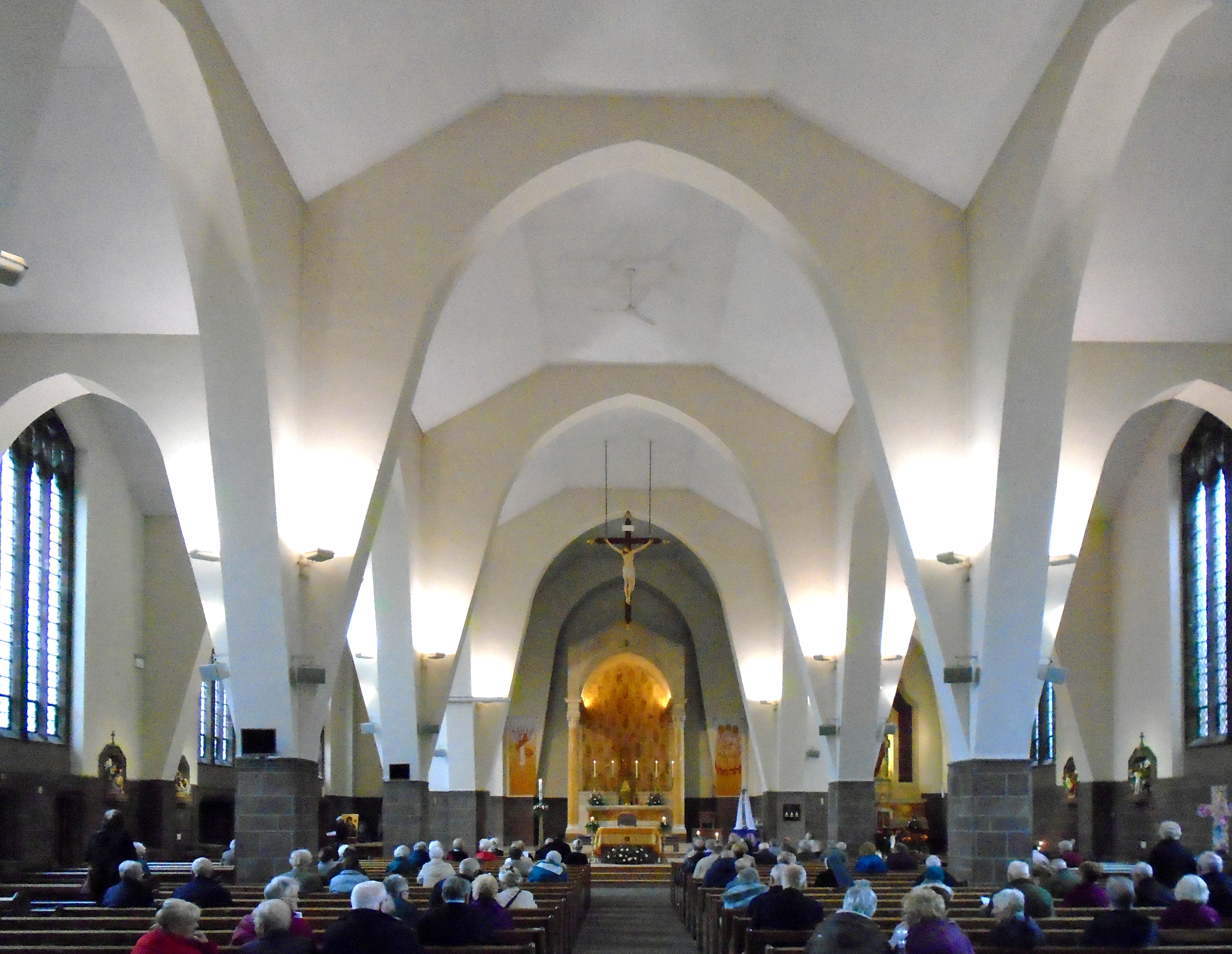
Interior of St Oswald, Old Swan
(1951–57; grade II)

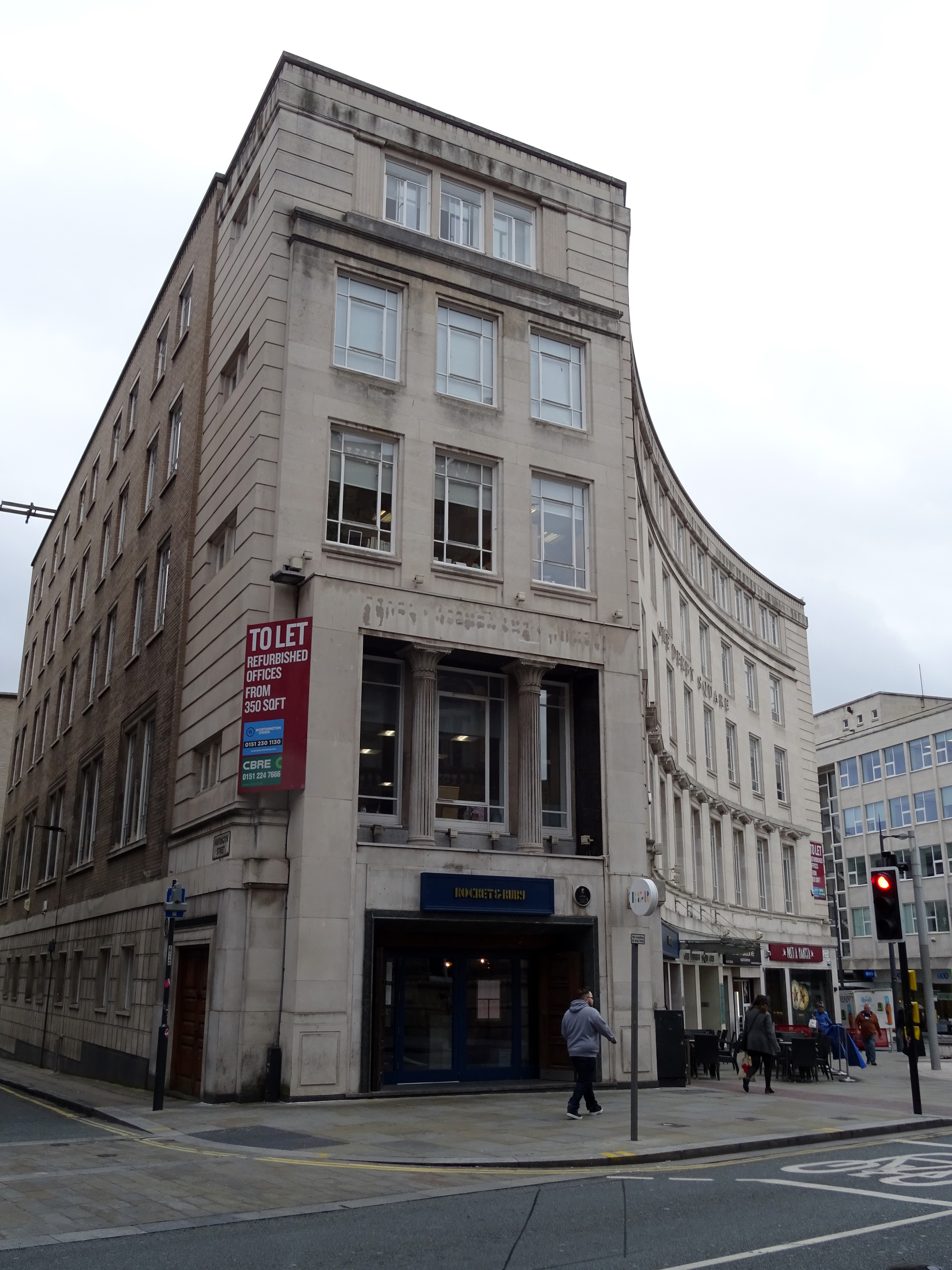
Pearl Assurance House, Derby Square
(1954–55)

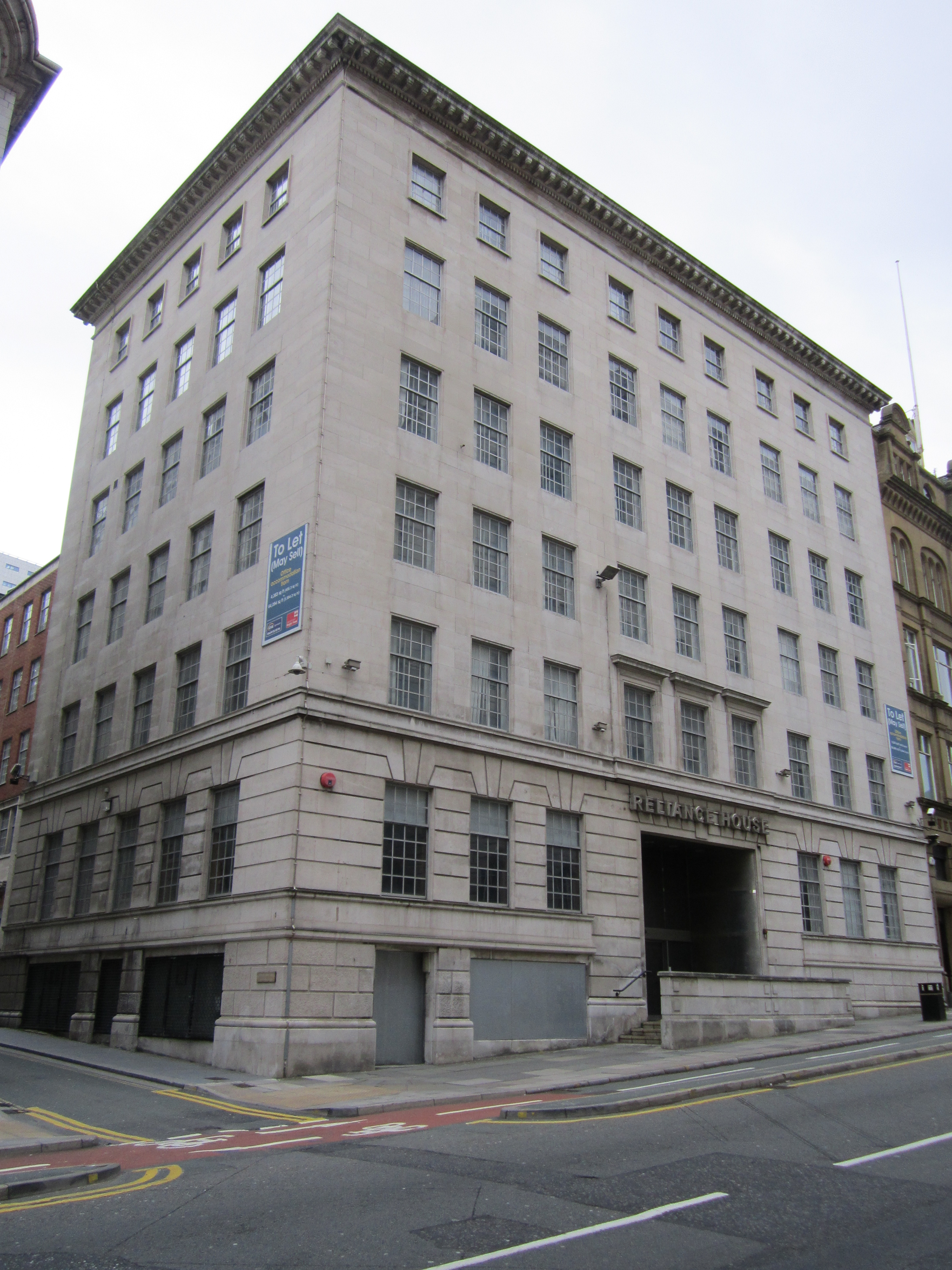
Reliance House, Water Street
(1954–56)

=== Post War 1960s & early 1970s buildings ===
St. John's Shopping Centre built in stages from 1962 to 1970, designed by James A. Roberts, covering over 6 acres (2.5 hectares), it replaced John Foster Jr.'s St. John's Market of 1822. Radio City Tower (also known as St. John's Beacon) is a radio and observation tower built in 1969 and opened by Queen Elizabeth II. Standing 452 feet (138 metres) tall, it was the tallest free-standing structure in Liverpool for decades.

The University of Liverpool expanded in the post-war years, William Holford, authored the 1949 plan for the expansion of the university. Notable architects of the era involved include: Basil Spence who designed the Chadwick Laboratory (1957–59) and the Sydney Jones Library (1976); Maxwell Fry who designed the university's Veterinary Science Building (1958–60); Yorke Rosenberg Mardall who designed the Engineering building (1962–65) and the Computer Laboratory (1967–69); Denys Lasdun designed the University Sports Centre, Oxford Road, (1963–66); Gerald Beech, designed the Sports Pavilion Geoffrey Hughes Athletic Ground, University of Liverpool (1961–62).

The Lutyens' design for the Metropolitan cathedral was estimated in 1952 to cost £27,000,000 to complete (roughly 770,000,000 in 2019), so it was decided to abandoned the design, a simpler design in a modernist style by Frederick Gibberd was adopted. Constructed between (1960–1967). While this is on a smaller scale than the Lutyens' scheme, it still manages to incorporate the largest panel of stained glass in the world, by Patrick Reyntiens. This is Liverpool's most famous post-war building. Metropolitan Cathedral is colloquially also referred to as "Paddy's Wigwam" due to its shape and the vast number of Irishmen who worked on its construction and are living in the area. The Roman Catholic parish church of St Ambrose (1959–61) was designed by Alfred Bullen.

The Atlantic Tower Hotel, situated on Chapel Street next to Saint Nicholas' Church and near Pier Head, opened in 1972 and was designed to resemble the prow of a ship to reflect Liverpool's maritime history. The Post & Echo Building in Old Hall Street opened in 1974 by Farmer & Dark. Also in Old Hall Street is Liverpool Cotton Exchange Building (1967) by Newton-Dawson, Forbes & Tate, involved the destruction of the superb Edwardian building of the same name by Matear & Simon.

The Playhouse Theatre was extended (1966–68) by Hall, O'Donahue & Wilson. West Derby Library (1964) was designed by the Liverpool City Architect, Donald Bradbury.

It was in 1967 that in order to save money the design for the west front of Liverpool Anglican cathedral was to be simplified, after the architect Giles Gilbert Scott died in 1960 his former office manager Frederick Thomas took over as architect and he produced the revised design that would be completed in 1978.

Queen Elizabeth II Law Courts are an example of Brutalist architecture and was built (1973–84), designed by Farmer and Dark. Another prominent example of brutalist architecture in the city is the office building New Hall Place the work of Tripe & Wakeham, built, (1972–1976). The former bank at 4 Dale Street, by Raymond Fletcher of Bradshaw, Rowse & Harker, designed 1967 built c.1971, use bold prismatic windows to cover the facade. The Mercure Atlantic Tower Hotel (1971–73) by Victor Basil & Keith McTavish is an eleven-storey tower with convex sided triangular floor plan.

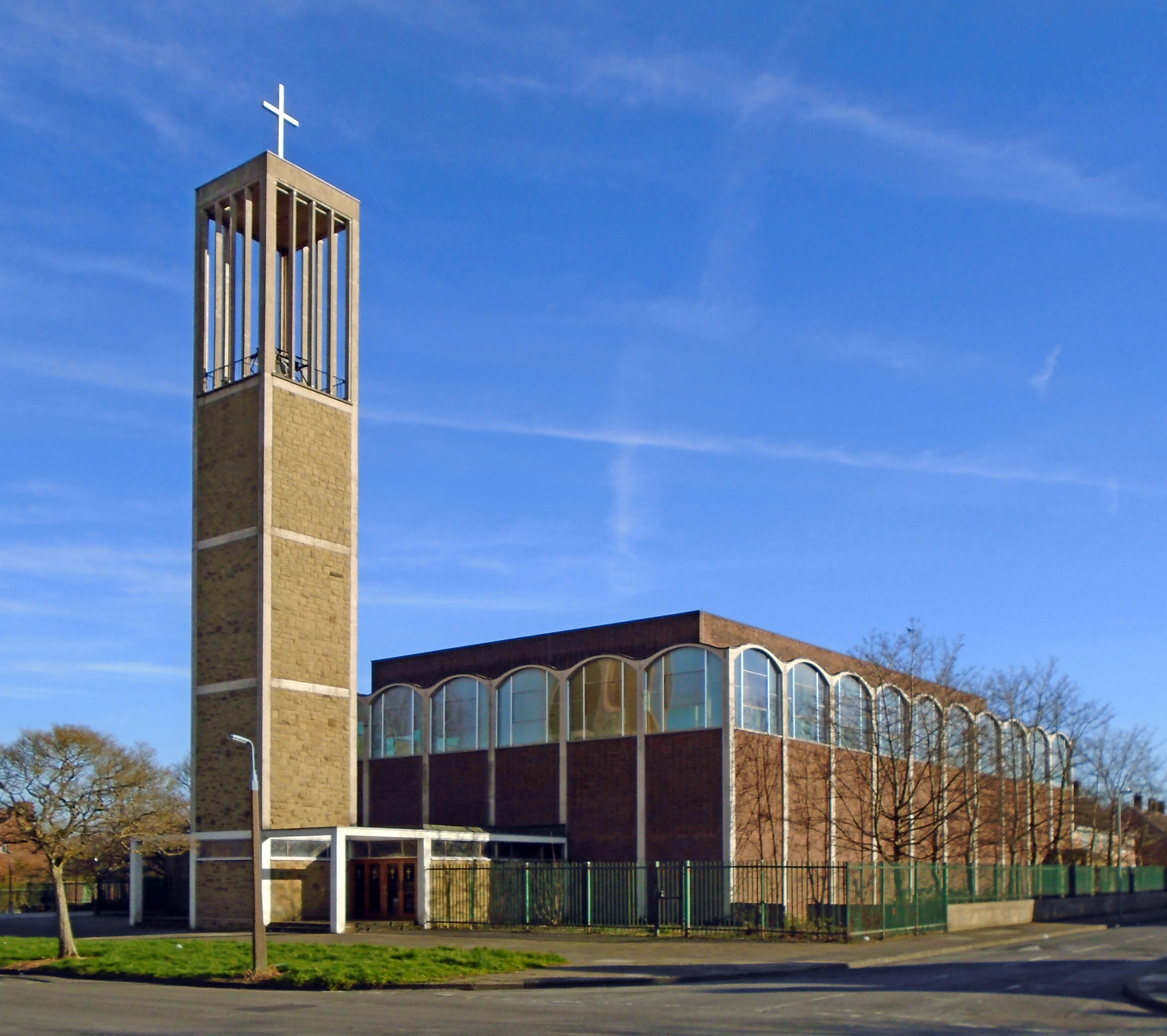
St Ambrose church, Heathgate Avenue, Speke
(1959–61; Grade II)

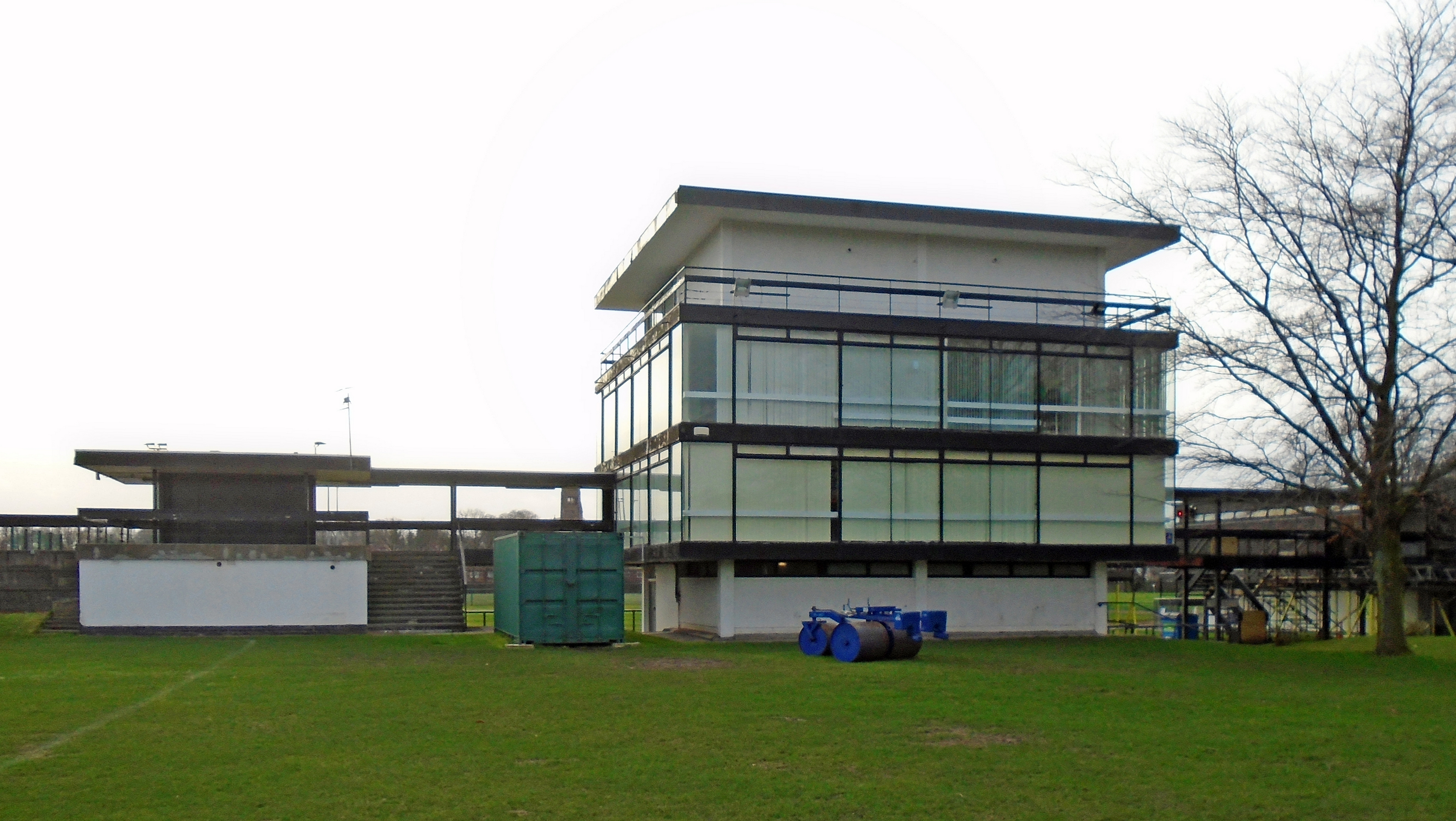
Pavilion, Geoffrey Hughes Memorial Sports Ground, Allerton
(1961–62; Grade II)

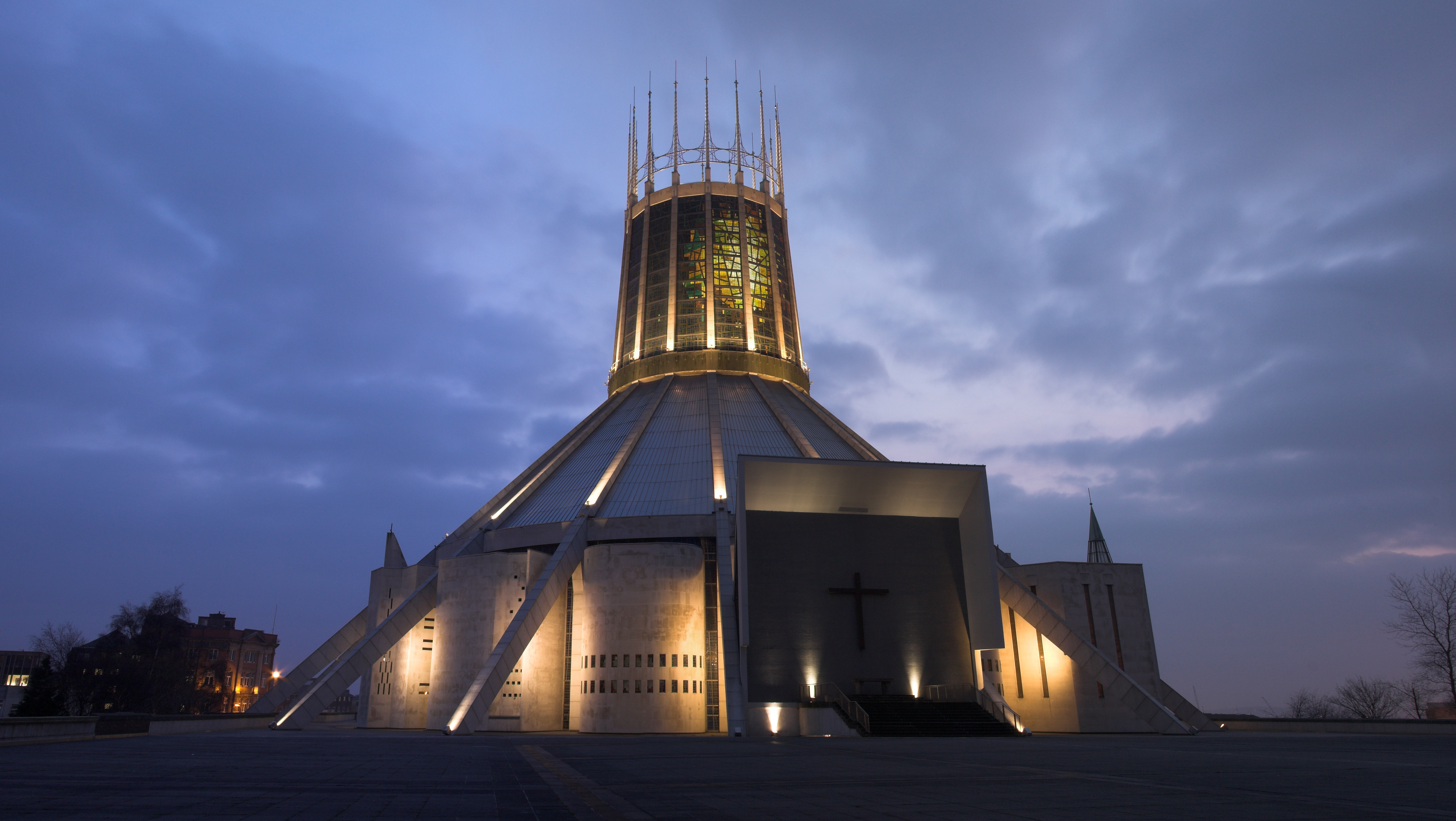
Liverpool Metropolitan Cathedral
(1962–67; Grade II*)

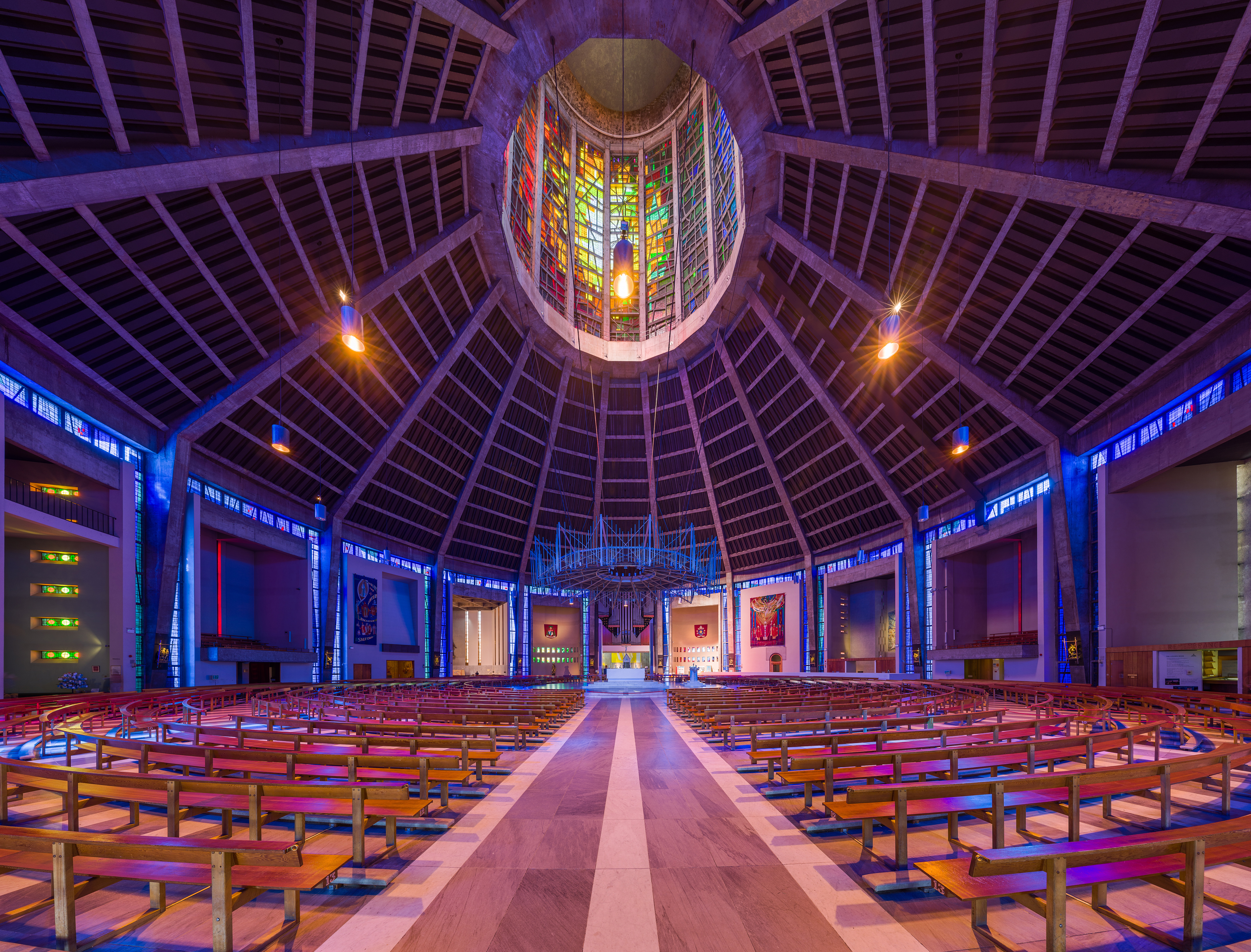
Liverpool Metropolitan Cathedral, interior
(1962–67; Grade II*)

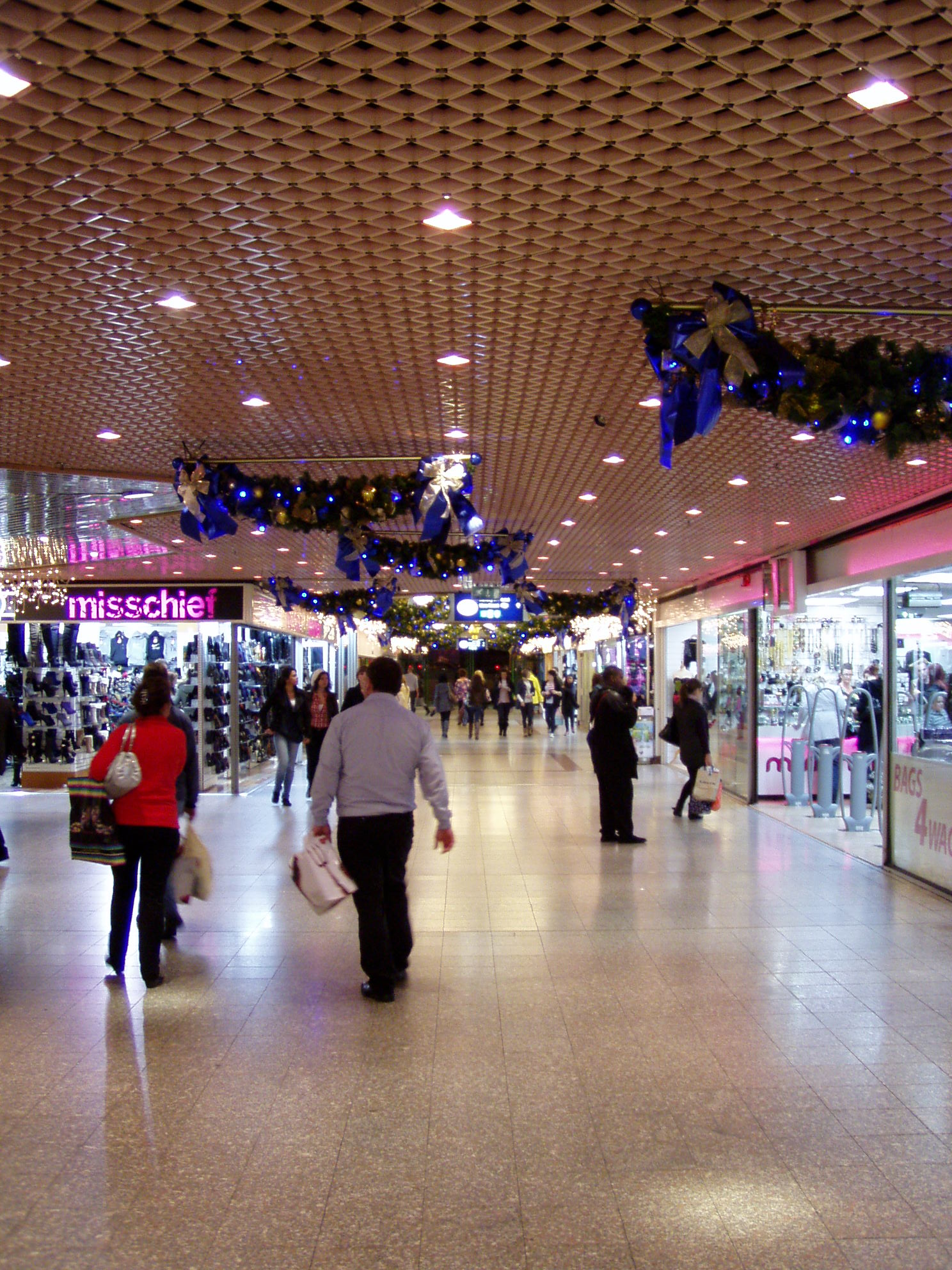
St. John's Shopping Centre
(1962–70)

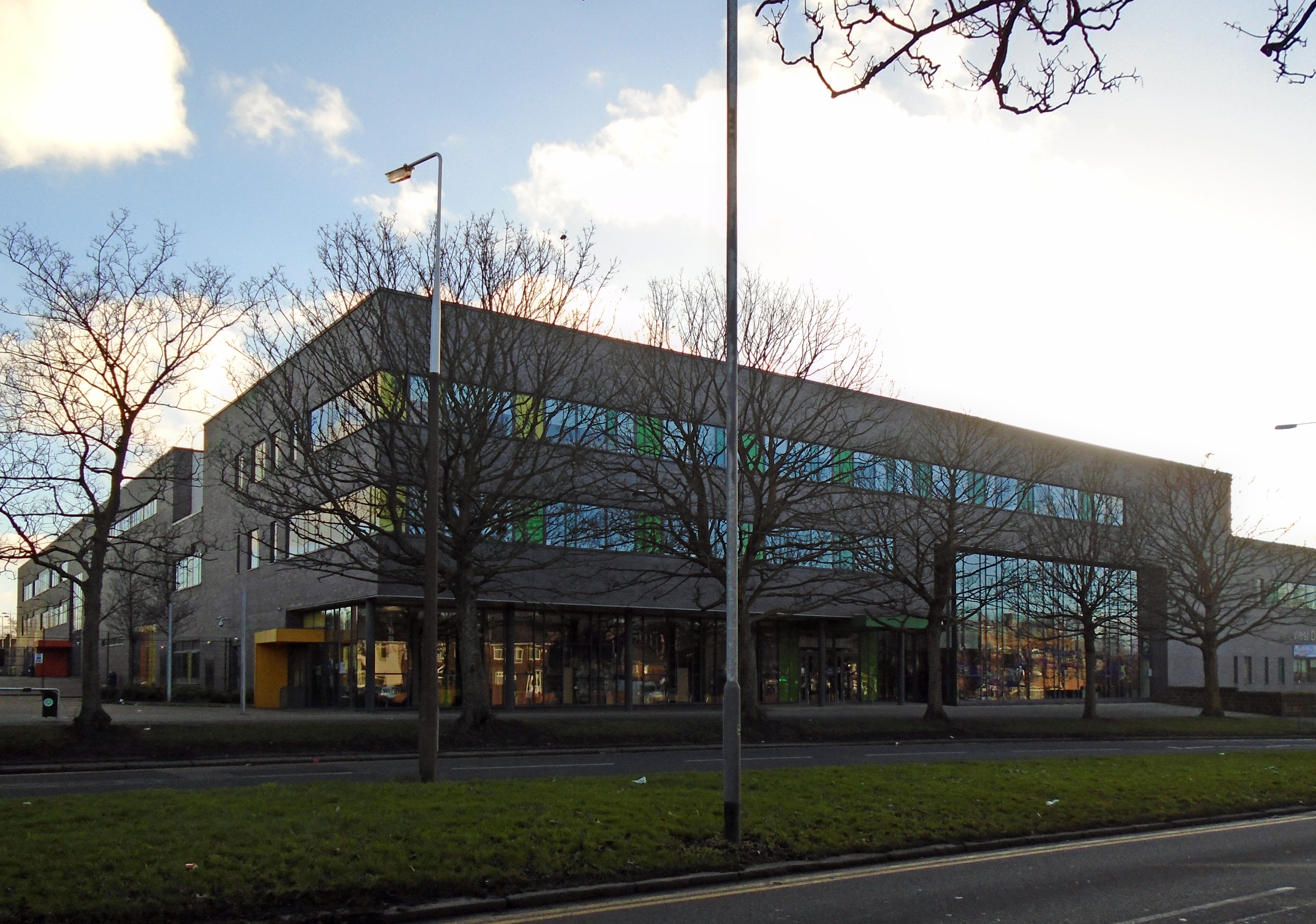
West Derby Library, Queens Drive, Clubmoor
(1964)

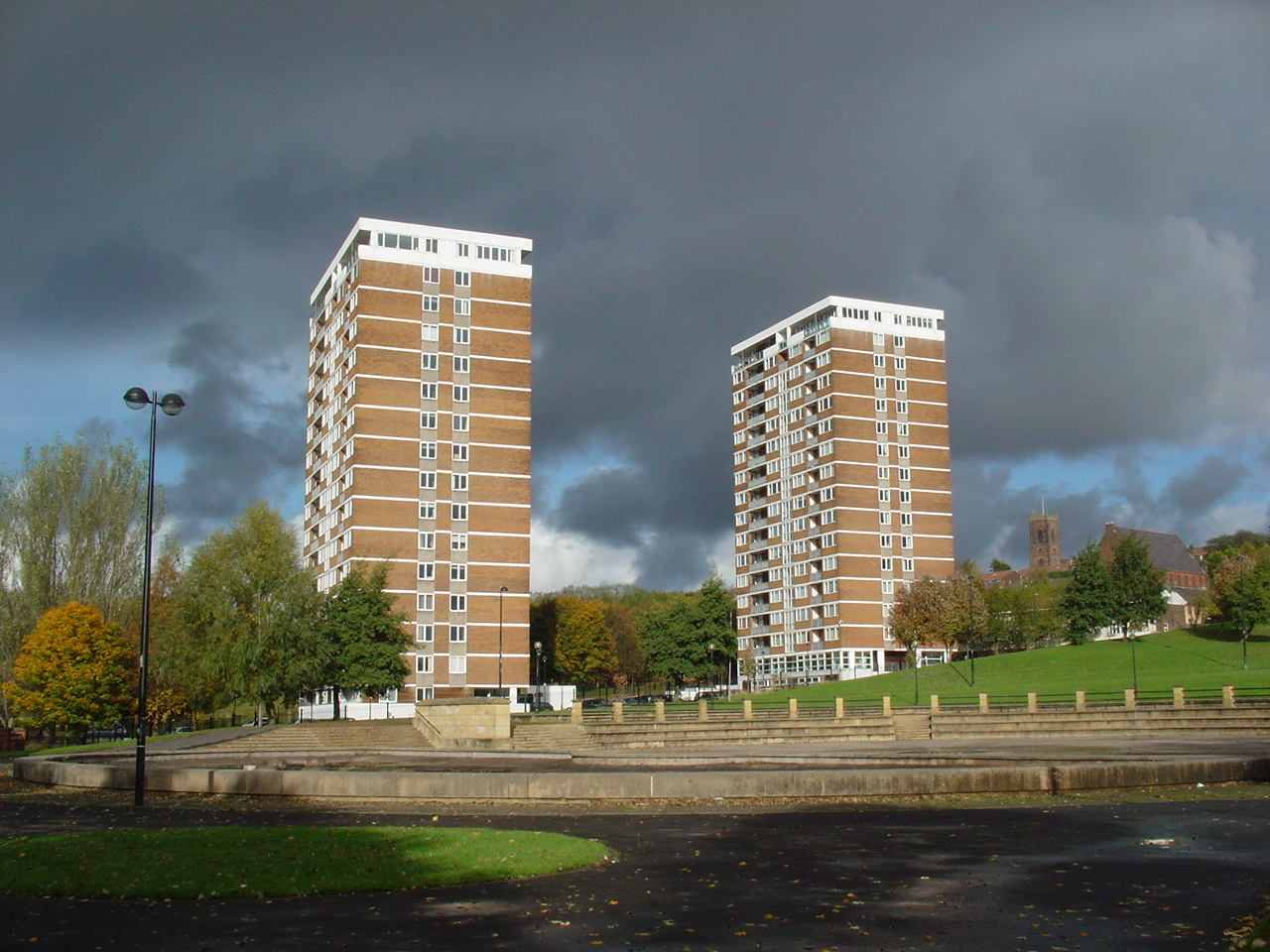
Conway Street Flats, Everton
(1964)

=== Late 20th century buildings ===
The largest of Liverpool's three mosques is the Al-Rahma mosque (1974) in the Toxteth area of the city.

The conversion in the Albert Dock of one of the warehouses into Tate Liverpool by James Stirling was opened in (1988), it is a rare example in Liverpool of Postmodern architecture. In the same style is Clayton Square Shopping Centre (1988–89) by Seymour Harris Partnership. The Custom and Excise Building (1991–93) by PSA Projects was created sitting over part of Queen's Dock. Also in Queen's Dock is the Liverpool Watersports Centre (1993–94) by Marks Barfield. Liverpool Women's Hospital was rebuilt (1992–95) by the Percy Thomas Partnership. The redevelopment of Princes Dock began in 1988, office buildings include No 8 Princes Dock, by Kingham Knight Associates.

The post-war era saw major construction of public housing in Liverpool, the number of dwellings constructed were as follows: between 1961 and 1965, 11922; between 1966 and 1970, 15215; between 1971 and 1975, 11122. A major housing scheme of the late 20th century was the Eldonian Village in Vauxhall, built 1987–95 on the site of Tate & Lyle's sugar refinery. The scheme is one of the largest examples of community-architecture schemes of the 1980s, the architects were Wilkinson Hindle Halsall Lloyd.

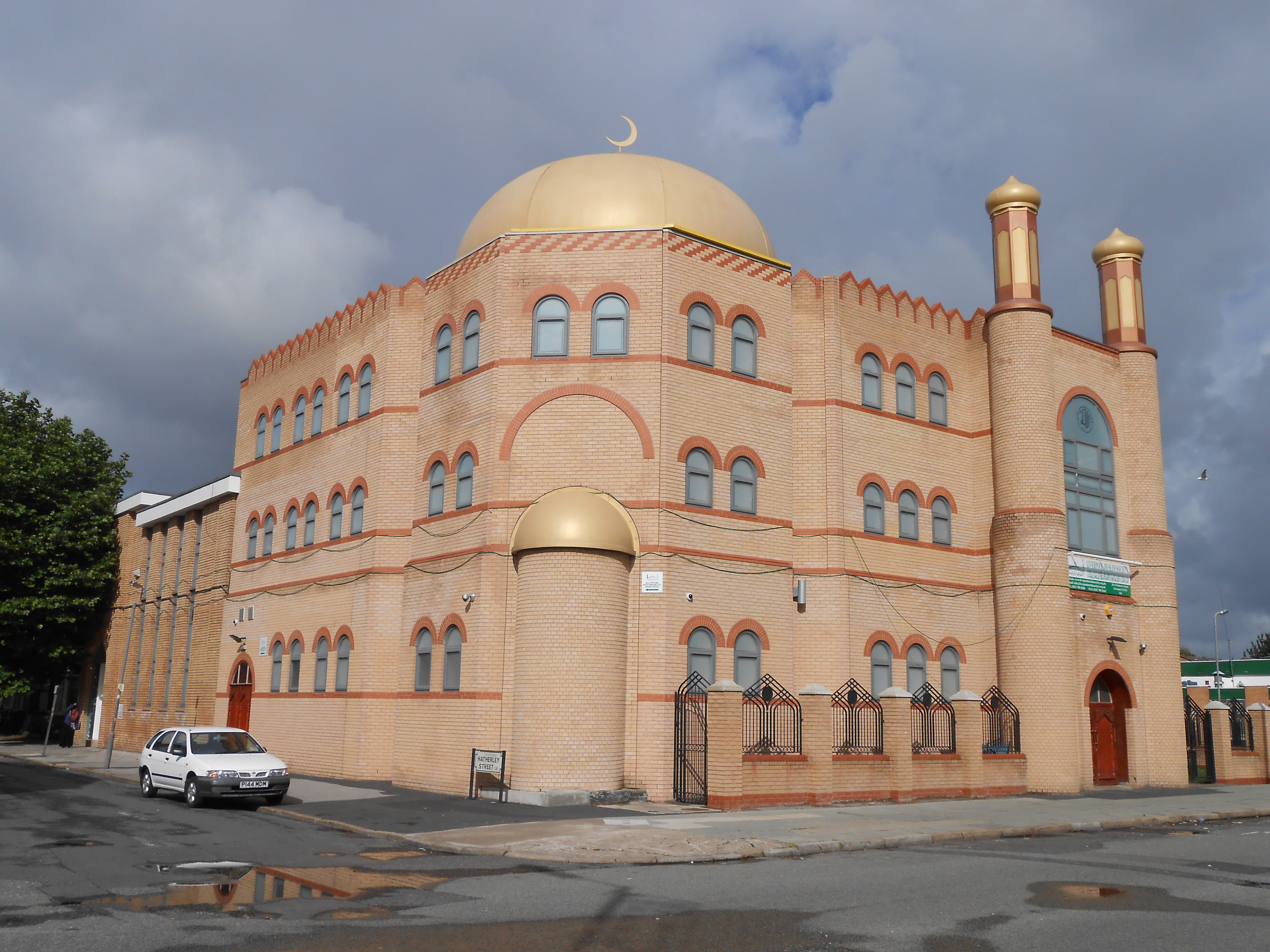
Al-Rahma Mosque, Hatherley Street, Toxteth
(1974) at the left of the photo, the main building was built the early 2000s

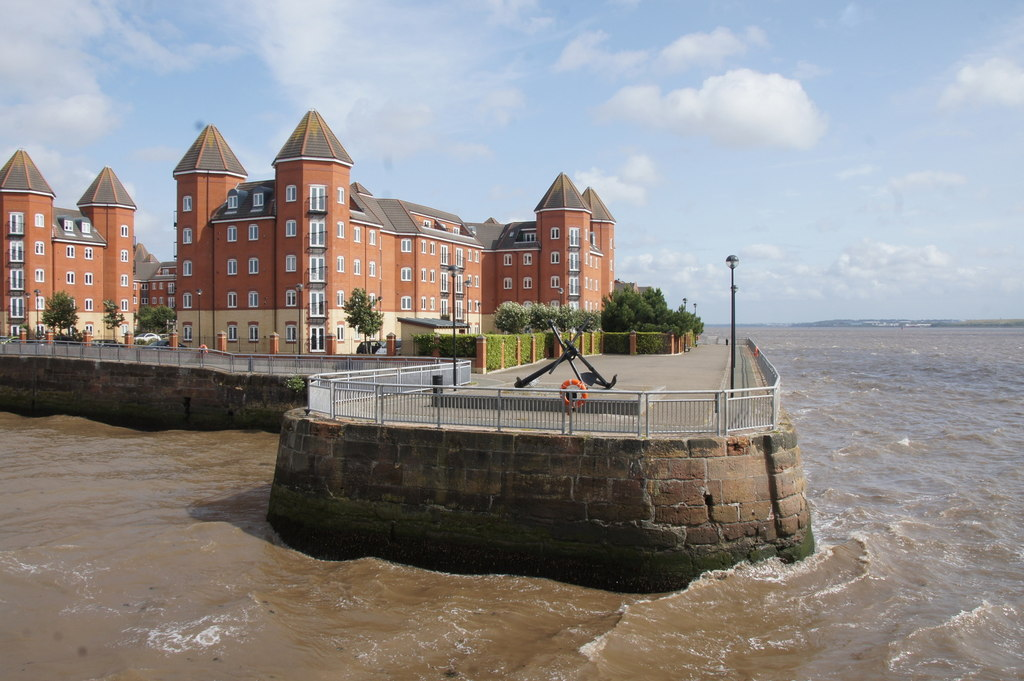
Housing, Brunswick Dock
(1980s)

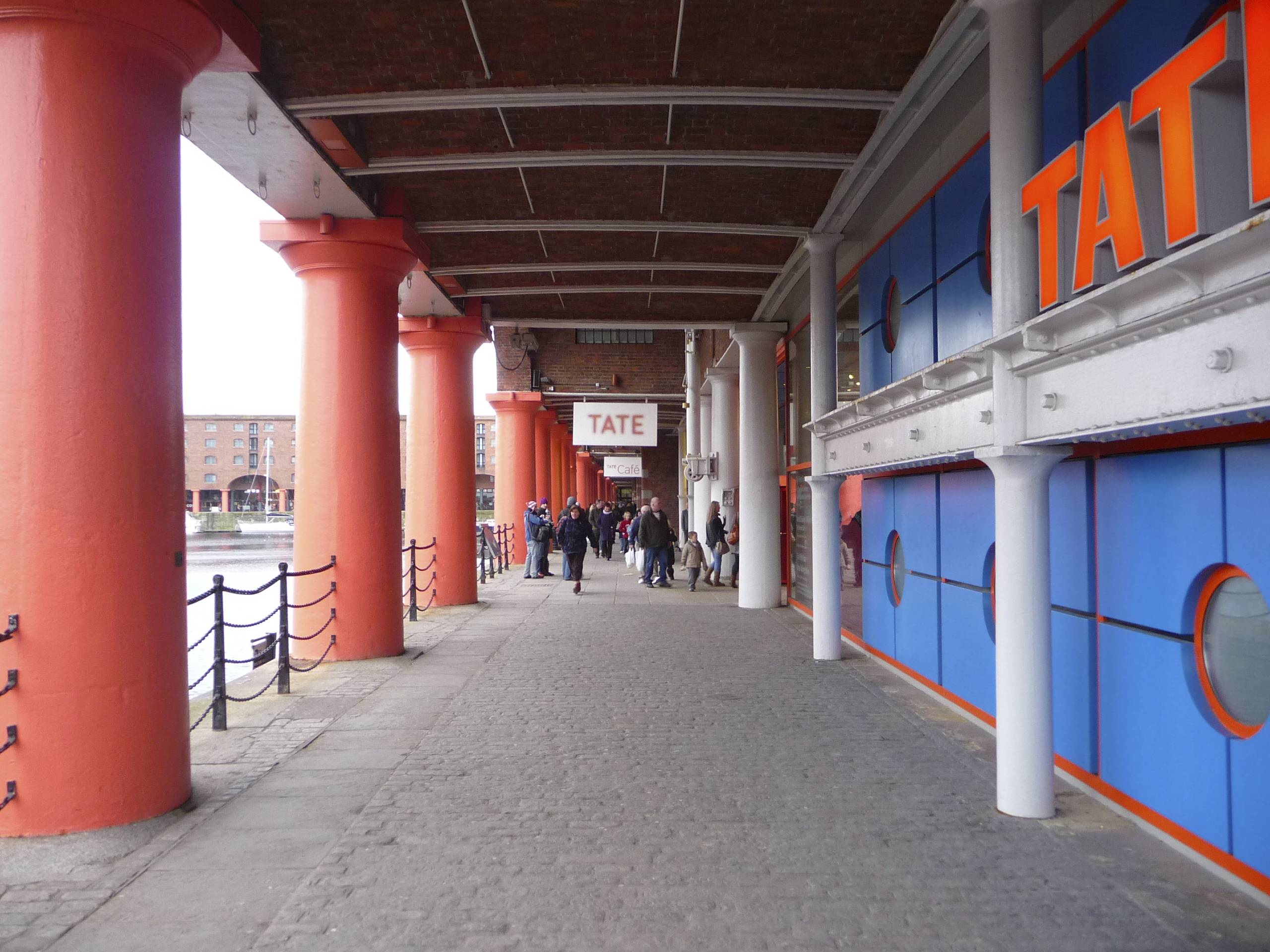
Tate Liverpool,
(1988, Grade I, due to being in Albert Dock)

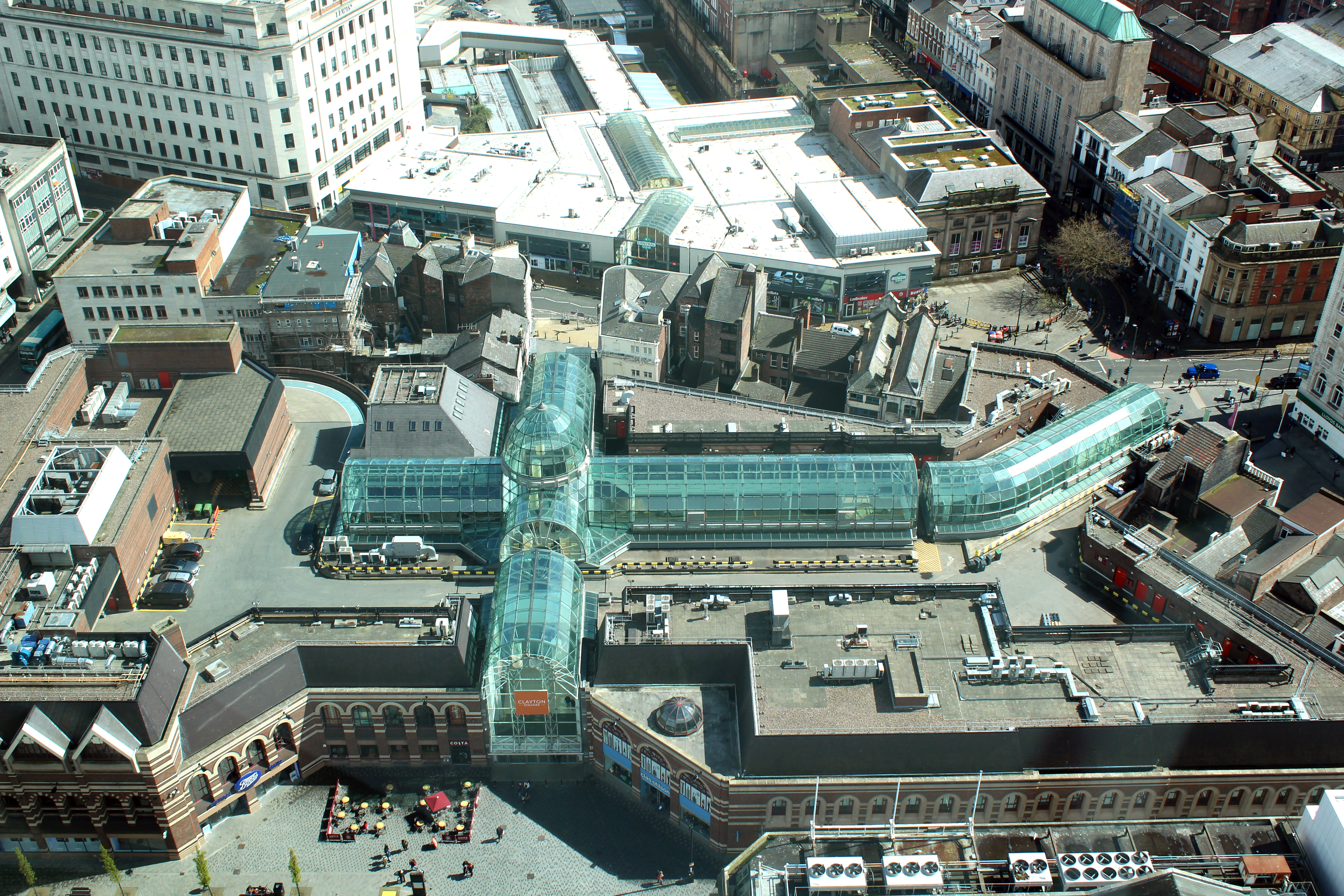
Clayton Square Shopping Centre
(1988–89)

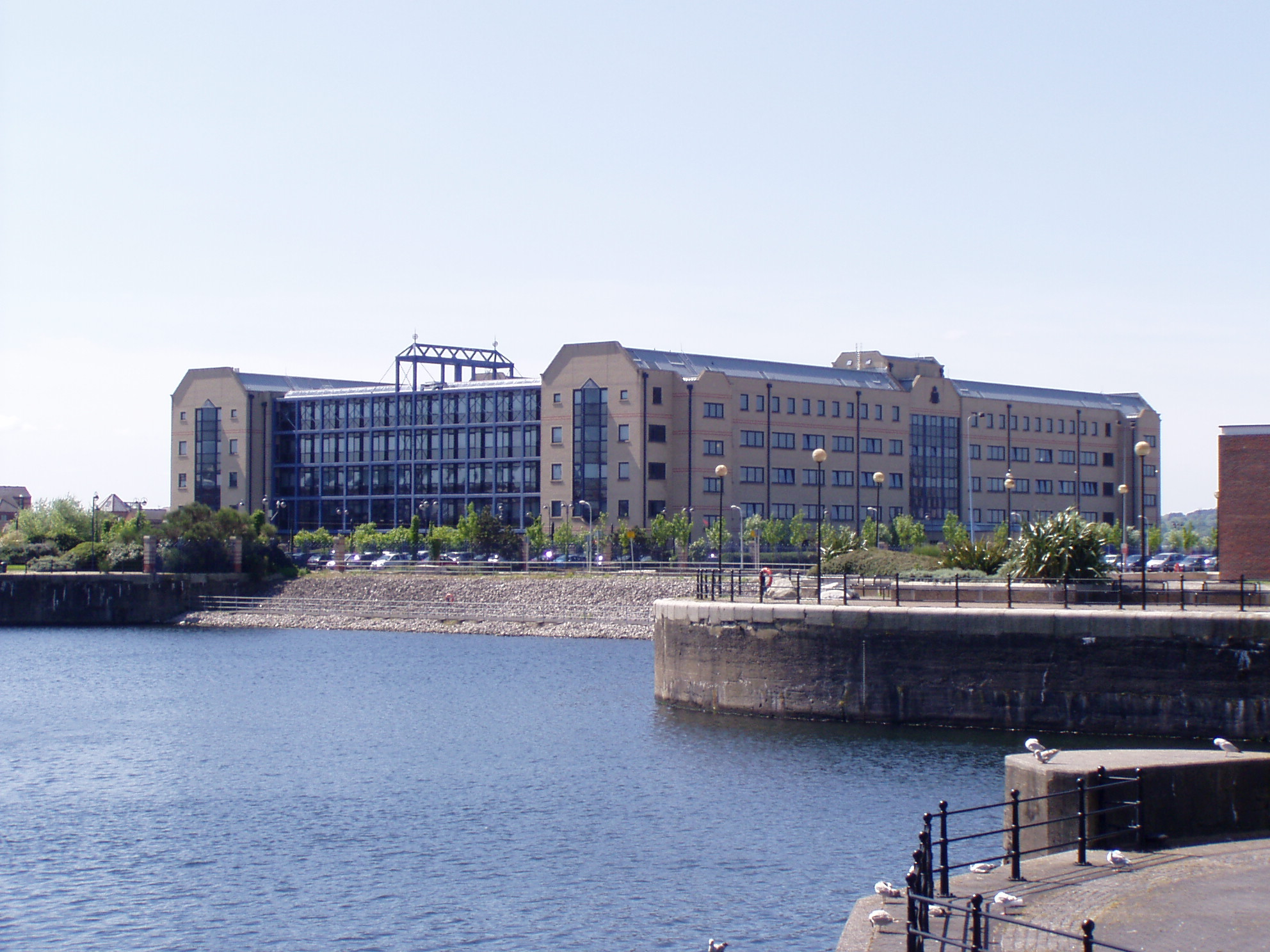
Customs and Excise Building, Queen's Dock
(1991–93)

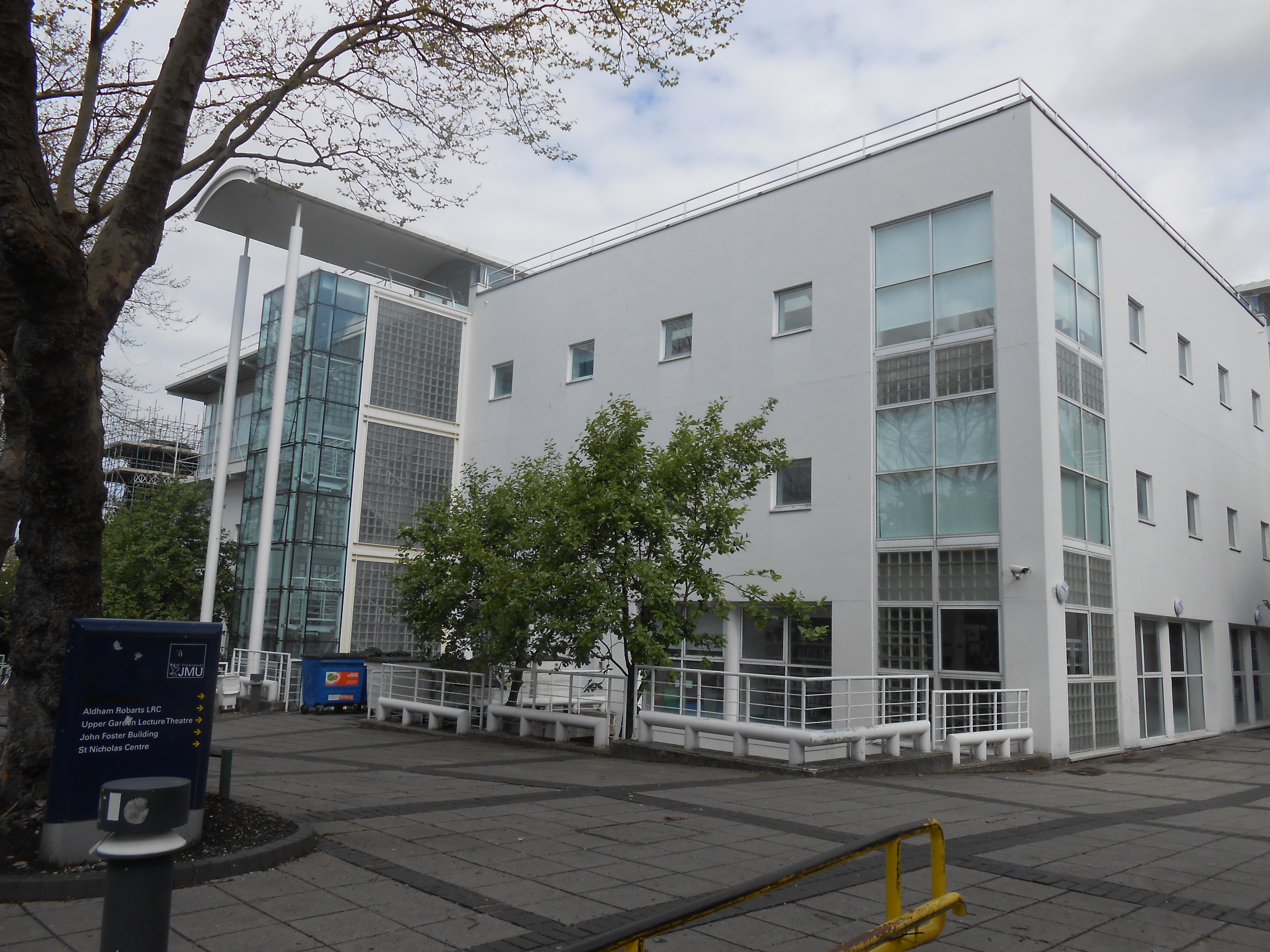
Aldham Robarts Learning Resource Centre, John Moores University, Maryland Street
(1992–93)

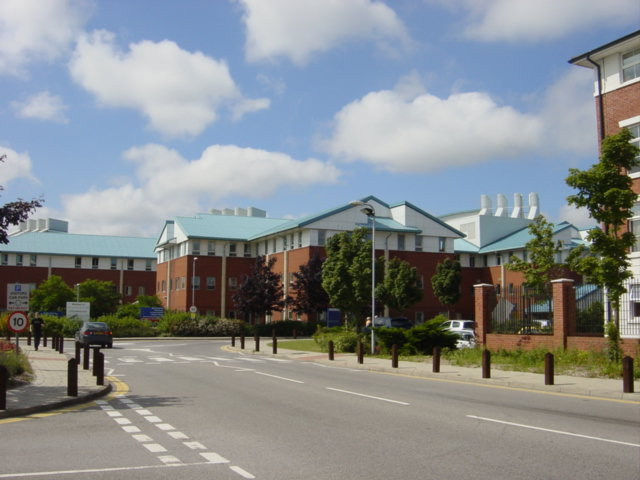
Liverpool Women's Hospital, Grove Street
(1992–95)

== 21st century ==
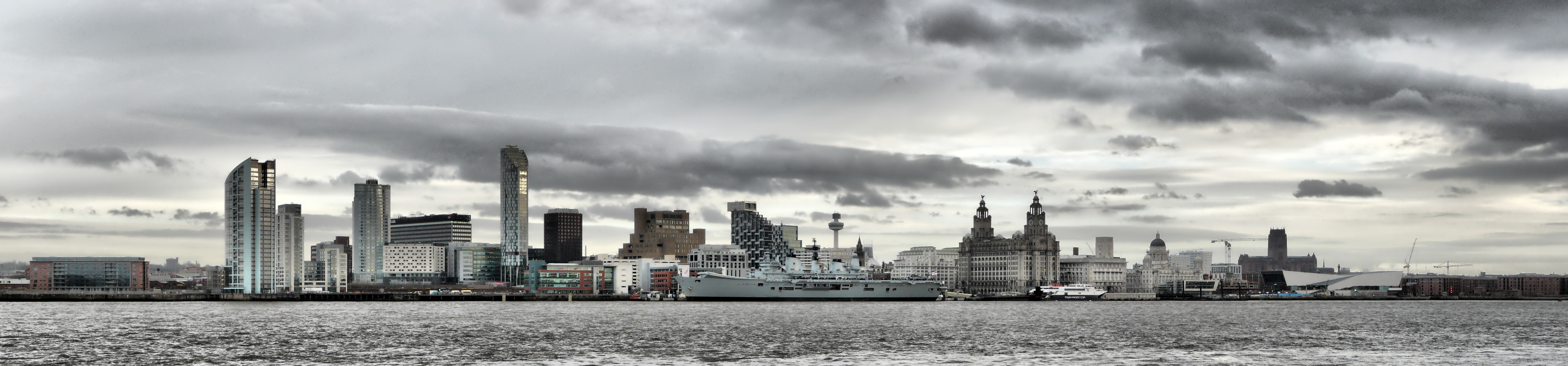
Liverpool Skyline with HMS Ark Royal docked at cruise terminal in 2009

Liverpool's architectural schemes at the beginning of the 21st century are dominated by the city's bid to become the European Capital of Culture in 2008. This ambition led to its listing as a UNESCO World Heritage Site between 2004 and 2021, and also to plans for redevelopment of Mann Island, the area between Albert Dock and Pier Head. Beating off illustrious competitors like Richard Rogers, Norman Foster and Edward Cullinan, in 2002, Will Alsop won the so-called Fourth Grace competition for the site and received the go-ahead with his project The Cloud. By 2004, however, the project was scrapped and alternatives sought.

Eventually, the waterfront position in front of the Cunard Building was taken by the Pier Head Ferry Terminal which was the winner of the 2009 Carbuncle Cup for "the ugliest building in the United Kingdom completed in the last 12 months". The Museum of Liverpool by Danish architects 3XN took another waterfront position next to the Port of Liverpool Building and opened in 2011, while Broadway Malyan filled the Fourth Grace site with their Mann Island Buildings (2008–12). Both projects were also shortlisted for the Carbuncle Cup in 2011 and 2012 respectively. The Mann Island Buildings also gave concern regarding some protected views onto the Three Graces.

Other recent buildings in the dock areas include the Echo Arena Liverpool and BT Convention Centre which officially opened on 12 January 2008 in King's Dock immediately south of Albert Dock, and West Tower (2005–07), north-east of Pier Head, which at 40 storeys is currently Liverpool's tallest building, but soon to be dwarfed by the planned skyscrapers of Liverpool Waters. Situated in the northern docks, the Liverpool Waters redevelopment led to Liverpool's recently acquired status of World Heritage Site coming under scrutiny. Consequently, in 2012, Liverpool – Maritime Mercantile City was put on UNESCO's List of World Heritage in Danger, and revoked in July 2021.

In recent years a number of creative architectural practices have been responsible for a number of innovative projects to revitalise the unused architectural fabric of the city. Notable, award-winning, projects include the Greenland Street Gallery for the A Foundation and the Toxteth TV building. Both of these projects were by Liverpool design practice Union North.

The largest development in central Liverpool in the 21st century is Liverpool One. In the future the Liverpool Waters scheme is a 50-year plan that promises to transform the northern docks stretching from the Pier Head to Bramley-Moore Dock. As part of the scheme Everton Stadium has been proposed.

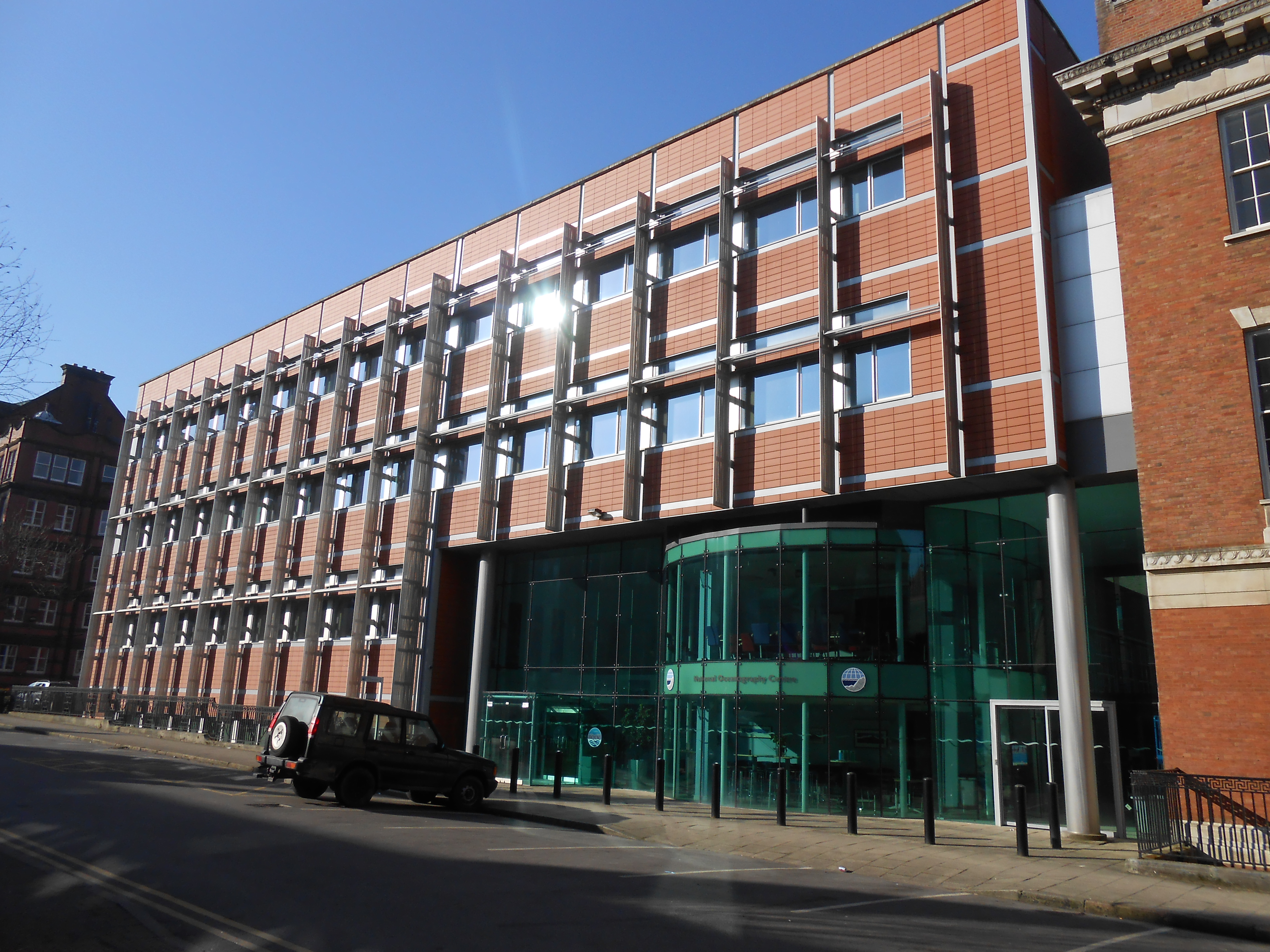
National Oceanography Centre, University of Liverpool, Brownlow Street, by Architects Design Partnership
(2003)

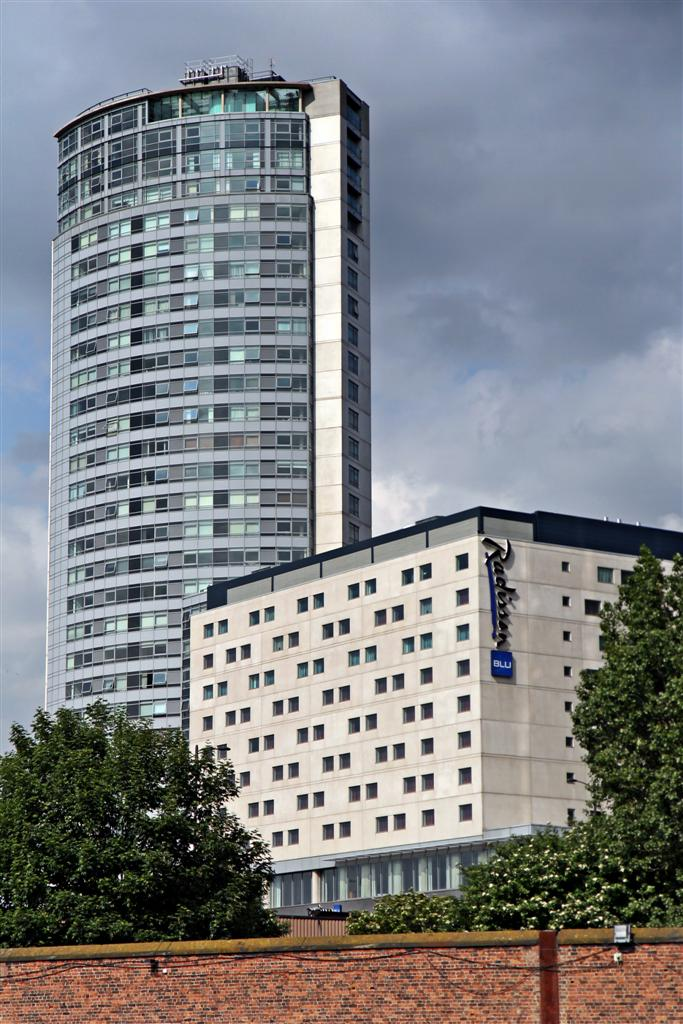
Beetham Tower, by Ian Simpson architect
(2004)

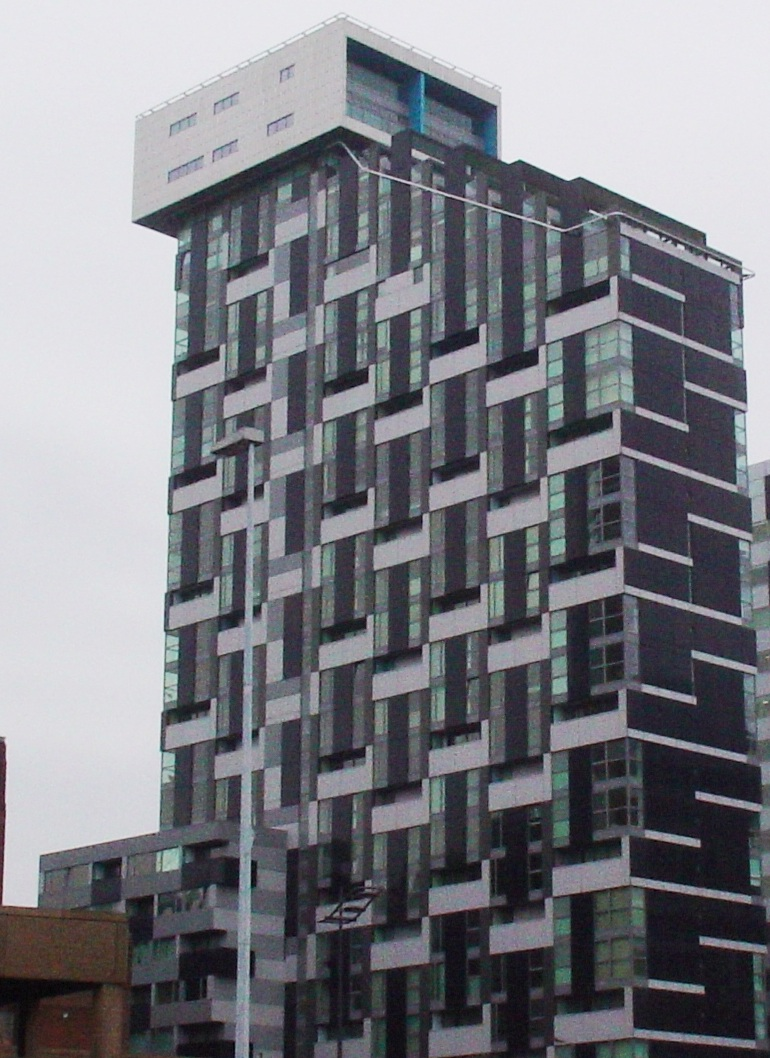
Unity Buildings, Chapel Street, by Allford Hall Monaghan Morris architects
(2004–07)

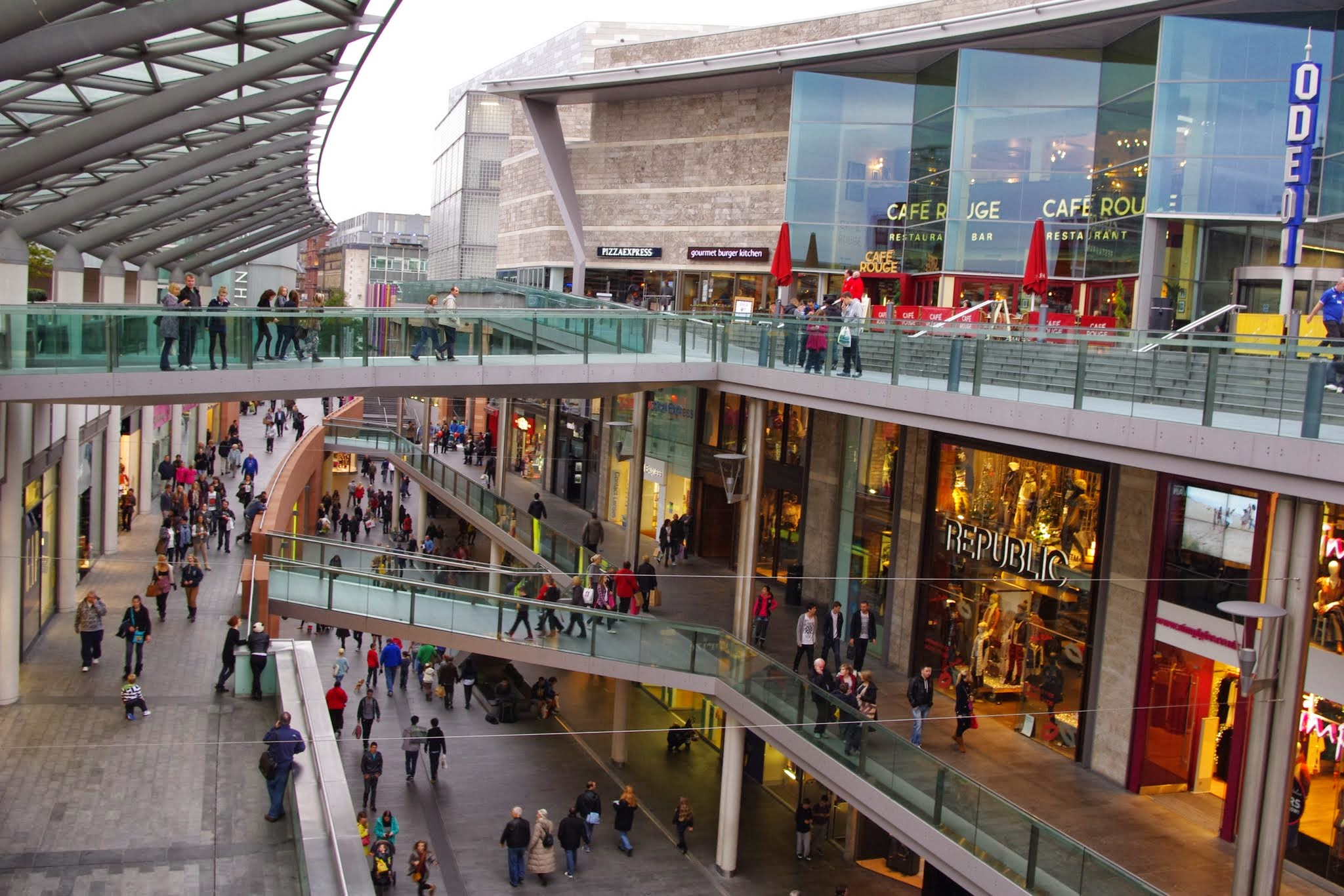
Liverpool One Shopping Centre, by Building Design Partnership
(2004–08)

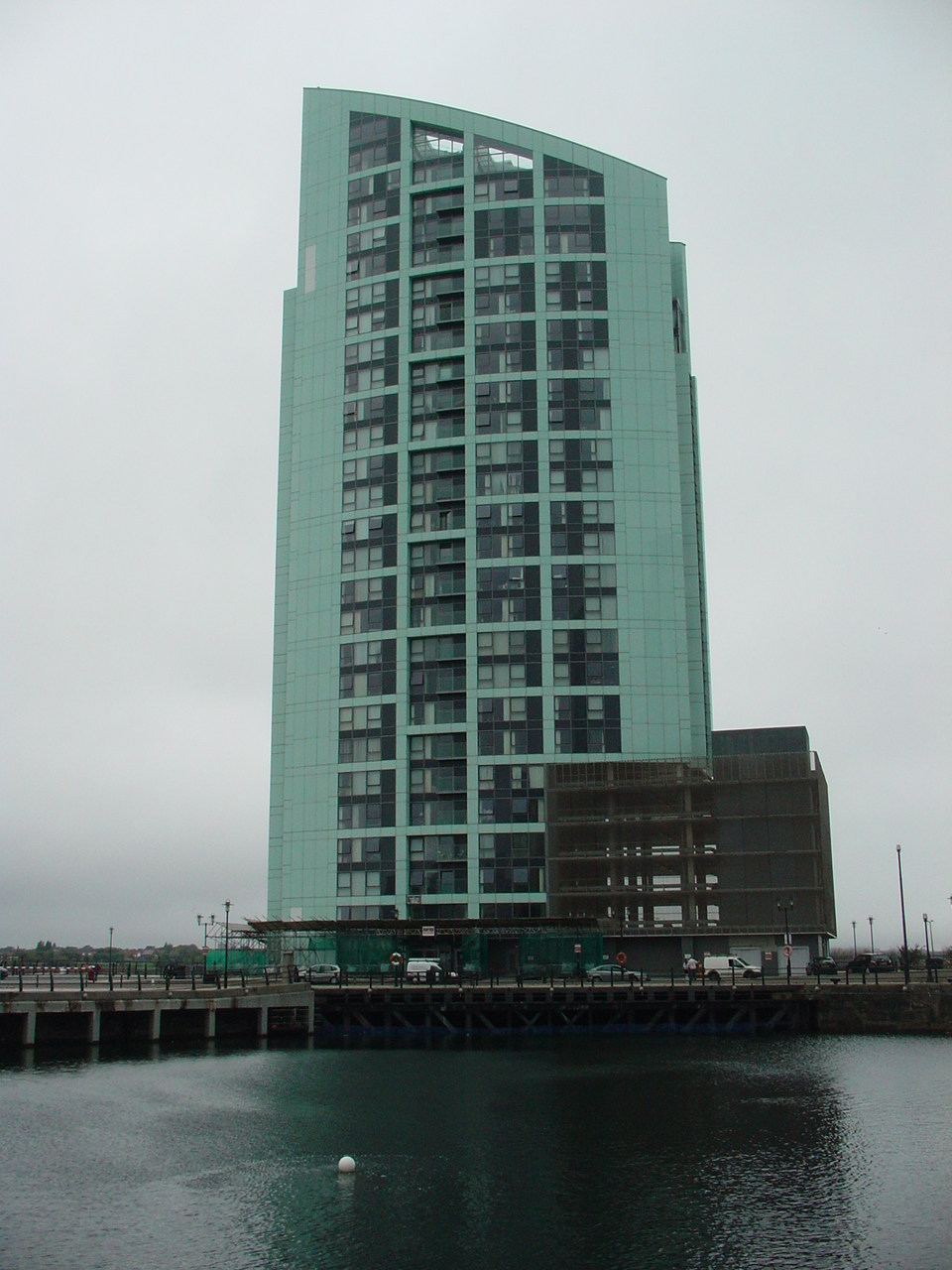
Alexandra Tower, Princes Dock, by AFL Architects
(2005–08)

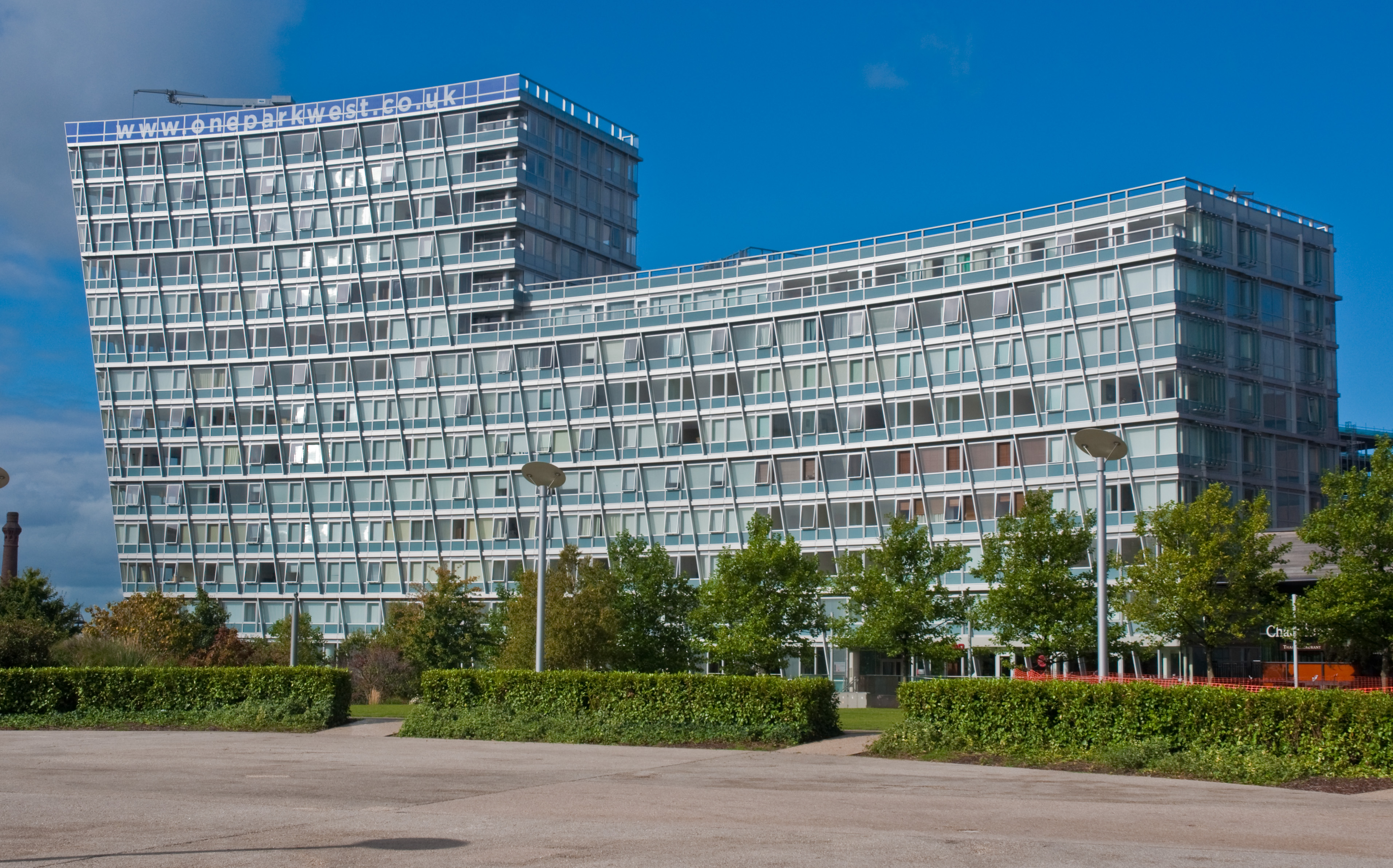
One Park West, by César Pelli
(2006–08)

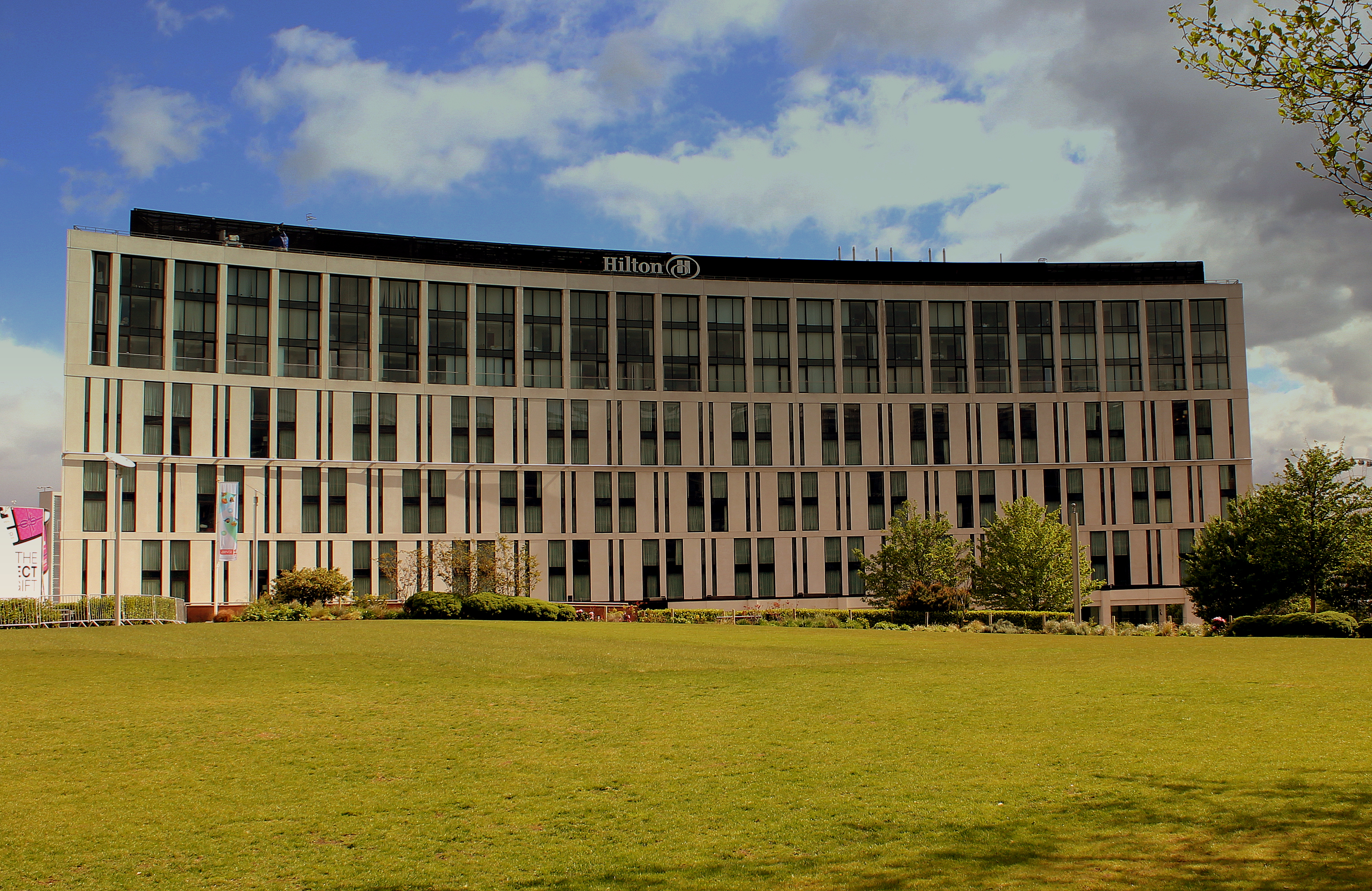
Hilton Hotel, by Squire and Partners architects
(2006–09)

== Gallery of views in the city ==
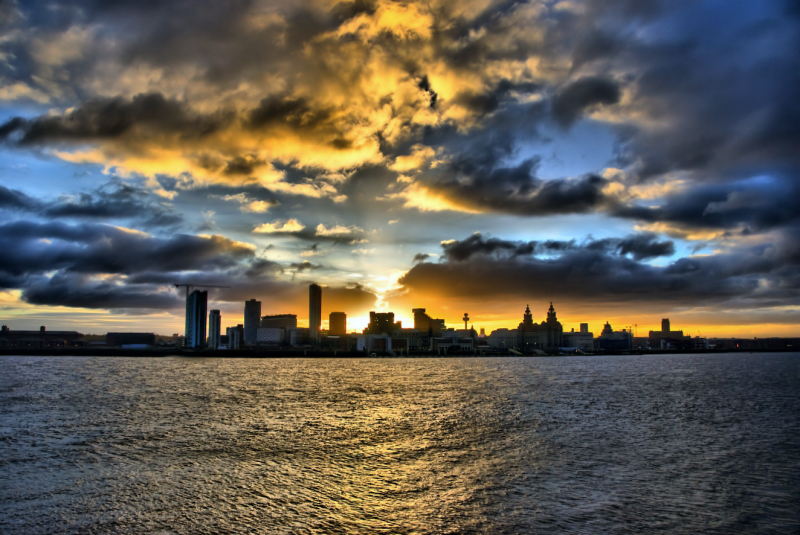
Liverpool waterfront at sunrise

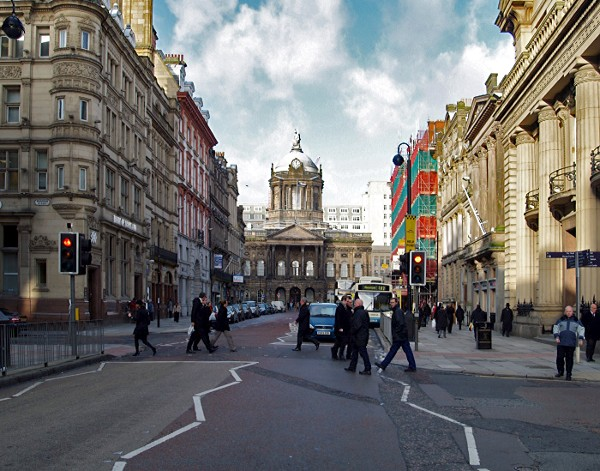
Castle Street Liverpool, Bank of England to the right, NatWest Bank to the left, Liverpool Town Hall ahead

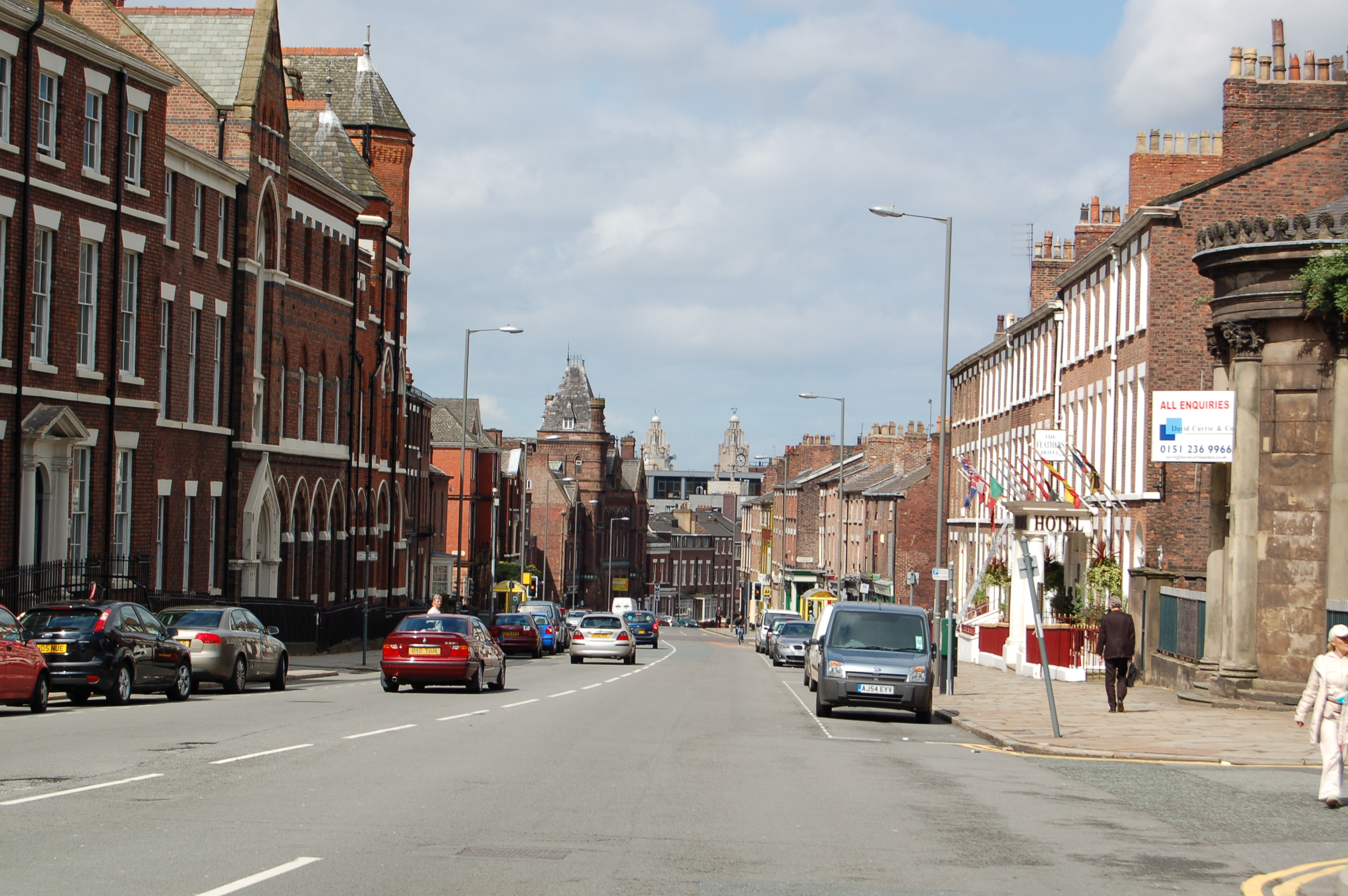
Liverpool's inner city has Georgian terraced streets. Wellington Rooms to the right, Royal Liver Building in the distance

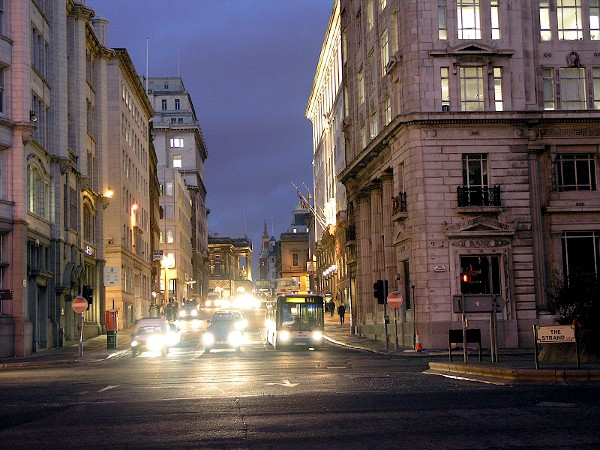
Water Street, Liverpool, West Africa House and India Buildings to the right, Tower Buildings, Oriel Chambers, Martins Bank and Town Hall to the left, Royal Insurance Building and Prudential Assurance Building in the distance

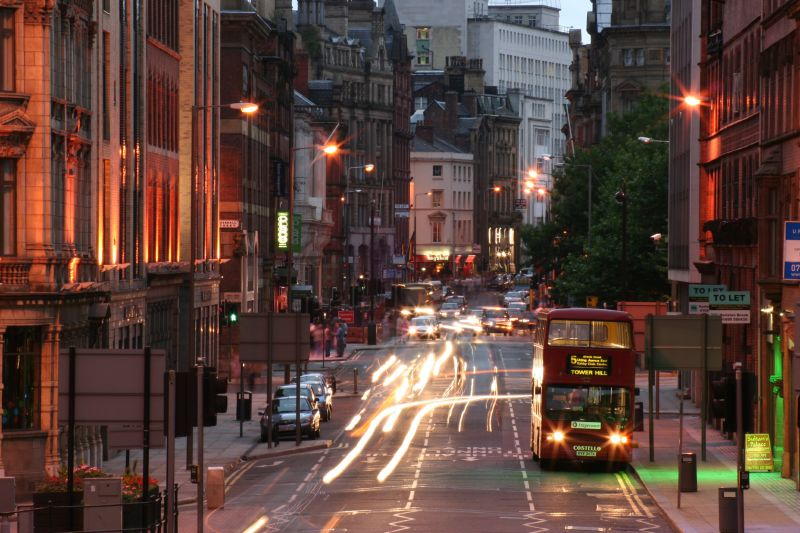
Victoria Street, Imperial Buildings, Midland Railway Goods Offices and General Post Office to the left, Bank of Liverpool to the right.

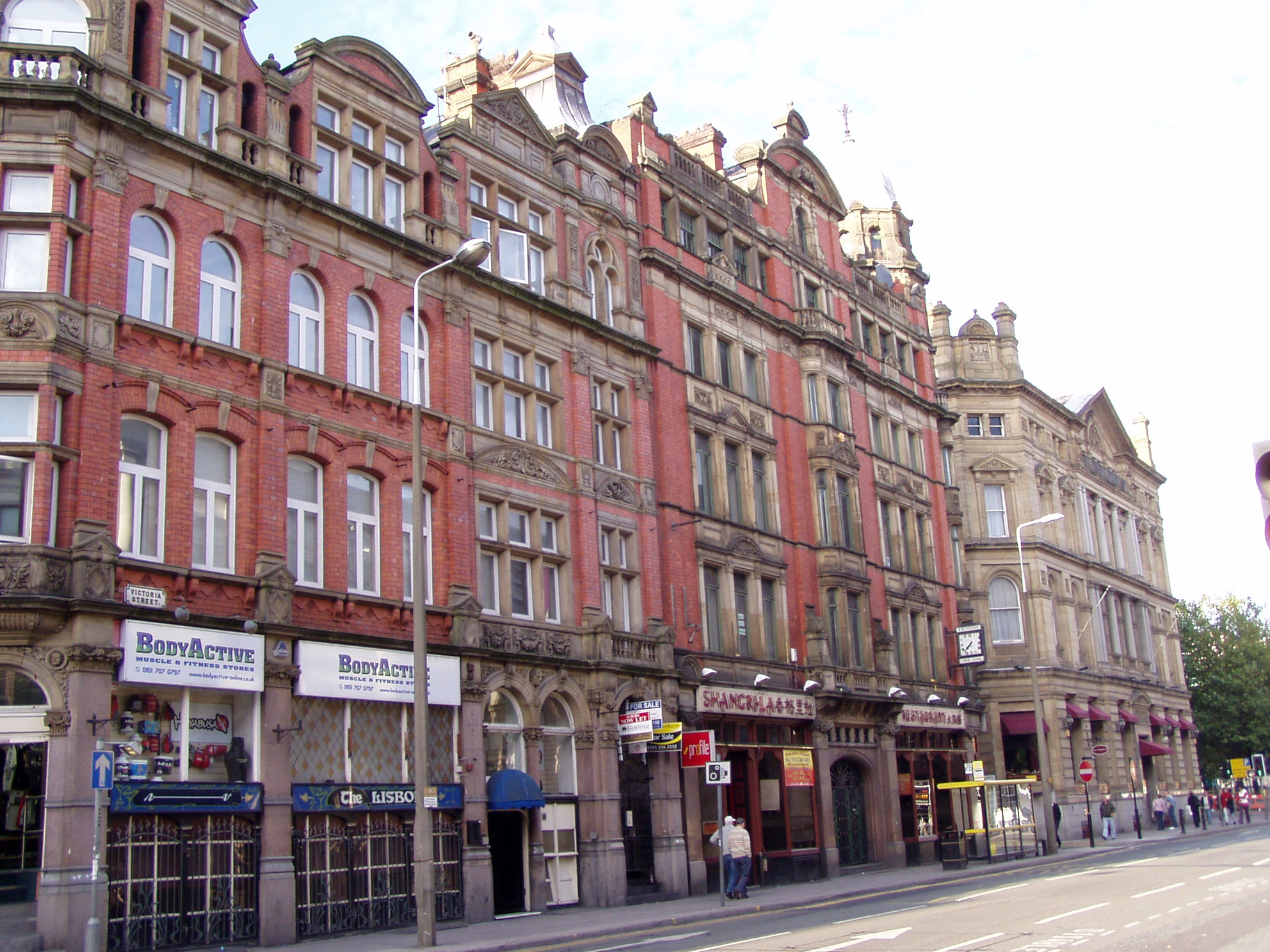
Victoria Street, showing Lisbon Buildings, Ashcroft Buildings and former Bank of Liverpool

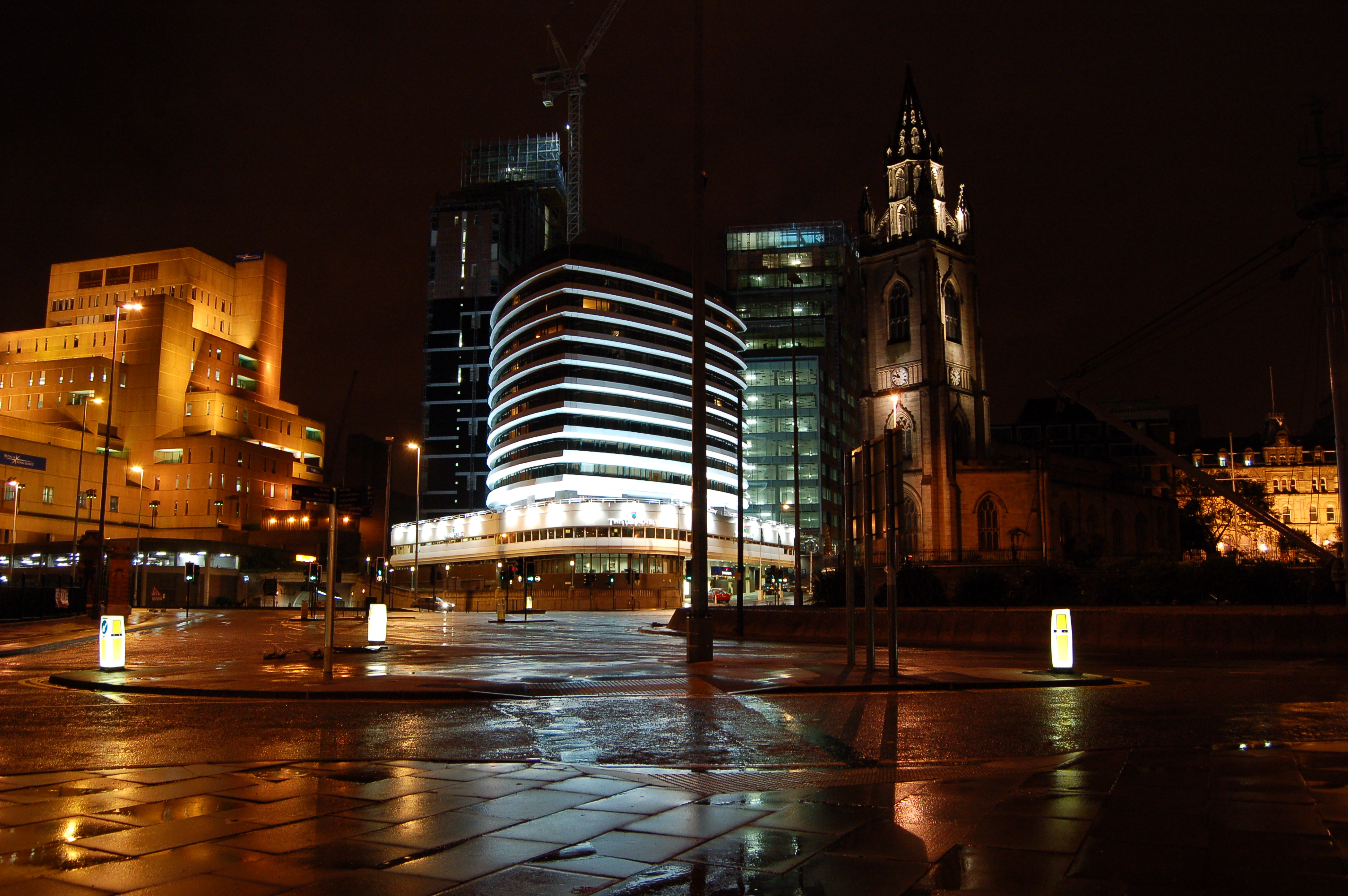
from left: Royal & SunAlliance Building (1976), Mersey Tunnel entrance (1934) (Grade II), Unity Residential (2007), Atlantic Tower Hotel (1974), Unity Commercial (2007), Our Lady and St.Nicholas' Church (1814) (Grade II), Mersey Chambers (1878) (Grade II)

== Liverpool School of Architecture founded 1895 ==
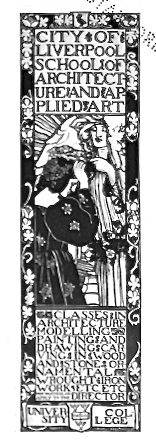
Poster 1913 for Liverpool School of Architecture and Applied Art

Liverpool has a long tradition of academic analysis in the field of architecture, being home to both the first School of Architecture officially The City of Liverpool School of Architecture and Applied Art founded 1895, the school was funded by both Liverpool City Council and what was then known as the University College Liverpool. The Architecture degree course was initiated in 1901. The second professor in post, Charles Herbert Reilly, was influenced by Beaux-Arts architecture as practised in the US, that it became a full department of what became the first University Department of Civic Design in the United Kingdom.

=== Holders of title Roscoe Professor of architecture ===
- Frederick Moore Simpson (1855–1928), professor (1894–1904)
- Charles Herbert Reilly (1874–1948), professor (1904–33)
- Lionel Bailey Budden (Born West Derby, Liverpool) (1887–1956), professor (1933–52)
- Robert Gardner-Medwin (1907–95), professor (1952–73)
- John Nelson Tarn (1934–2020) professor (1974–95)
- David Dunster (1945–2019), professor (1995–2010)
- Robert Kronenburg, professor (2010–present)

== Architects represented in Liverpool ==
Architects, many of renown, are well represented in Liverpool, including:

=== Dock Engineers to the Port of Liverpool (1710–1973) ===
The following were the civil engineers that were appointed Dock Engineer to the Port of Liverpool, that oversaw the building of the dock system between 1710 and 1897 increasing the system from about 4 to 350 acres. Gladstone Dock opened 1927 added 58 acres and the Seaforth Dock added 500 acres in 1971.

- Thomas Steers (c. 1670 – 1750), Dock Engineer (1710–50) designer of Old Dock and Salthouse Dock, and what is now Canning Dock but at this stage was a dry dock.
- Henry Berry (1719–1812, ) Dock Engineer (1750–89) designer of George's Dock (later filled in 1900 to create Pier Head), King's Dock and Queen's Dock. Duke's Dock was created in this period probably designed by James Brindley. Manchester Dock dated from this period, filled in 1928–36.
- Thomas Morris (c. 1754 – 1832), Dock Engineer (1789–99) oversaw the completion of Queen's Dock.
- John Foster Sr. (1759–1827), Dock Engineer (1799–1824) oversaw the building of Prince's Dock designed by William Jessop & John Rennie the Elder, The Union Half Tide Basin and Brunswick Basin, later remodelled as part of Coburg Dock.
- Jesse Hartley (1780–1860) Dock Engineer (1824–60), designed Albert Dock, Bramley-Moore Dock, Brunswick Dock; Canada Dock, Canning Half Tide Dock, Clarence Dock, Collingwood Dock, Harrington Dock, Nelson Dock, Salisbury Dock, Sandon Dock, Stanley Dock, Trafalgar Dock, Victoria Dock, Wapping Dock, Waterloo Dock, Wellington Dock and oversaw the remodelling of Canning Dock.
- John Bernard Hartley (1814–1869) Dock Engineer (1860–61)
- George Fosbery Lyster (1821–99) Dock Engineer (1861–97), designed Alexandra Dock, Liverpool, Hornby Dock, Langton Dock; enlarged Harrington Dock, rebuilt the Herculaneum Dock, and created Coburg Dock from preexisting facilities, rebuilt Prince's Half-Tide Dock, enlarged Toxteth Dock.
- Anthony George Lyster (1852–1920), Dock Engineer (1897–1913) extended Huskisson Dock
- Thomas Monk Newell (1863–1932), Dock Engineer (1913–28), designed Gladstone Dock
- Thomas Lord Norfolk (1875–1962), Dock Engineer (1928–41)
- Leopold Leighton (1884–1964), Dock Engineer (1941–49)
- Adrian B. Porter (1899–1958), Dock Engineer (1949–58)
- John Donald Jameson Saner (1895–1962), Dock Engineer (1958–60)
- Norman Alaister Matheson (1908–66), Dock Engineer (1960–66)
- Martin Ager (1913–?), Dock Engineer (1966–73)

A notable civil engineer John Hawkshaw worked with Jesse Hartley on the docks.

=== Surveyors to Liverpool Corporation (from 1938 City Architect) (1786–1970) ===
The following held the post of Surveyor to Liverpool Corporation, which included designing buildings for the city:

- The Eyes family of Liverpool held the post for over 150 years including, John Eyes Sr. (died 1773) & John Eyes Jr.,
- Charles Eyes (c. 1754 – 1803) (Liverpool born), nephew of John Jr., Surveyor (1786–90), is best known for his 1785 map of Liverpool
- John Foster Sr. (1758–1827) (Liverpool born), Surveyor (1790–1824), designed, the now-demolished Goree Warehouse & St. Luke's Church with his son.
- John Foster (1786–1846) (Liverpool born), Surveyor (1824–35), designed, with his father St. Luke's Church, The Oratory, some of his finest buildings have been demolished these are: The Custom House, the 1836 classical front to Lime Street Railway Station & St. John's Market
- Joseph Franklin (1784–1855), Surveyor (1835–1848), designer of Great George Street Congregational Church, 75–79 Bold Street
- John Weightman (1798–1883), Surveyor (1848–65), (not to be confused with his near-contemporary John Grey Weightman) designer of, Walton Gaol, the Main Bridewell and also the Municipal Buildings, Liverpool
- E.R. Robson (1836–1917), Surveyor (1865–71) oversaw the completion of the Municipal Buildings, the design of which he modified.
- Thomas Shelmerdine (1845–1921), Surveyor (1871–1914), designed many buildings in the city, List of architectural works by Thomas Shelmerdine.
- Albert D. Jenkins (dates?), Surveyor (1914–1938), College of Commerce (1928–31), Tithebarn Street; former Slaughterhouse (1929–31) Prescot Road; oversaw the building of Speke Airport (1933–38)
- Sir Lancelot Keay (1883–1974) new title of City Architect (1938–48) in his prior role as director of housing for Liverpool he was co-designer of St Andrews Gardens
- Ronald Bradbury (1908–71) City Architect (1948–1970) oversaw much of the post-war housing built in Liverpool, much of which has been demolished, including the "Piggeries" in Everton, that was demolished only 22 years after being built.

=== Borough Engineers to Liverpool Corporation (1847–1934) ===
- James Newlands (1813–1871) first Borough Engineer (1847–1871) (the first person in the UK to hold such a post) created Liverpool's sewer system
- George Deacon (1843–1909) Borough Engineer (1871–1880) he designed the Lake Vyrnwy scheme with Thomas Hawksley
- Thomas Anderson? Borough Engineer (1880–1890)
- Henry Percy Boulnois (1846–1927) Borough Engineer (1890–1898)
- John Alexander Brodie (1858–1934) Borough Engineer (1898–1934), started the ring road; Liverpool–East Lancashire Road; Queensway Tunnel

=== Architects who designed buildings in the city during the Georgian period ===
- Robert Adam responsible for the remodelling of Woolton Hall (1774–80)
- Edmund Aikin, who at the end of his architectural career was based in Liverpool, designed the Wellington Rooms (1815–16)
- Decimus Burton, designed the now-demolished classical villa (1825) Dingle Lane, Dingle
- Sir William Chambers, designed the Theatre Royal (1772), Williamson Square, demolished.
- Thomas 'Greek' Harrison, designed The Lyceum, Liverpool (1800–02), the tower of Our Lady and St. Nicholas Church (1811) and Allerton House (1815–16) now a ruin.
- Timothy Lightoler, architect of the impressive domed parish church of St. Paul's (1763–69), St Paul's Square, demolished 1932
- John Nash, architect of the now-demolished Childwall Hall (1806), the surviving gate lodge (1835) might be his work
- Clark Rampling, architect of the Liverpool Medical Institution (1835–37)
- Thomas Rickman whose early career as an architect was spent in Liverpool, designed St George's Church, Everton (1813–1815) and St Michael's Church, Aigburth (1814)
- Thomas Ripley, designed the 2nd Custom House (1717–22), long demolished
- Samuel Rowland (1789–1844), (Liverpool based) architect of St. Bride's Church (1830), the Deane Road Jewish Cemetery (c.1836) and the Royal Bank & Royal Bank Buildings (1837–38).
- George Stephenson, designed the original Liverpool and Manchester Railway (1825–30) and Wapping Tunnel (1826–29).
- John Wood, the Elder of Bath (commissioned in 1749 to design the original Public Exchange which later became the Town Hall)
- James Wyatt Town Hall extended at rear 1785, building gutted by fire 1795, added dome 1802, added the portico and designed the interior (c. 1800 – 1820).

=== Architects who designed buildings in the city during the Victorian period ===
- Thomas Allom designed the Brownlow Hill infirmary with Henry Francis Lockwood (1842–1843) and William Brown Library and Museum (1857–60), modified in execution by John Weightman.
- George Ashdown Audsley & William Audsley (Liverpool based) designed Streatlam Tower (1871), 5 Princes Road; 92 Bold Street (1890s)
- Sharpe, Paley and Austin designed the church of St Matthew and St James, Mossley Hill (1870–75)
- Thomas Denville Barry (1815 or 16 – 1905) (Liverpool based), designed the buildings for Toxteth Cemetery
- George Frederick Bodley designed Church of Saint John the Baptist, Tuebrook (1867–70)
- W. D. Caröe designed the Gustav Adolf Church (1883–84) and the Adelphi Bank (1892), Castle Street.
- Henry Clutton designed St Francis Xavier College (1876–77)
- Charles Robert Cockerell designed the Bank of England (1846–48), castle street; interiors of St George's Hall (1851–54); and the Liverpool, London and Globe Building (1856–58)
- James Kellaway Colling designed The Albany (1856–58), Old Hall Street
- Edward Corbett (1812–97) designed the North and South Wales Bank (1838–40), Derby Square
- Culshaw and Sumners (Liverpool based) designed Midland Railway goods warehouse, Victoria Street (1872)
- John Cunningham designed Lime Street Railway Station
- Charles Ernest Deacon (1844–1927) (Liverpool based) designed the former City Education Office in Sir Thomas Street
- James Francis Doyle (Liverpool born), designed Commercial Saleroom Buildings (1879); Hartley's Jam Factory (1886); Albion House (1895–98) with Richard Norman Shaw; the Royal Insurance Building (1903)
- Thomas Duncan (1804–1868) (Water Engineer to Liverpool Corporation) designed Everton Waterworks (1857)
- Peter Ellis (Liverpool born) designed Oriel Chambers (1864) Water Street and 16 Cook Street (1866)
- Christopher Obie Ellison (1832 or 3–1904) (Liverpool born) designed the Eye and Ear Hospital (1878–80); Sheltering Home for Destitute Children (1888–89)
- Harvey Lonsdale Elmes designed Liverpool Collegiate School, Shaw Street (1840–43); St George's Hall (1841–54); remodelled Thingwall Hall (1846–47) Knotty Ash; Rainhill Hospital (1846–51)
- Ernest George made additions to Gateacre Grange (1883)
- Edward Goldie joint architect with his father of Sacred Heart Church, Everton (1885–86)
- George Goldie joint architect with his son of Sacred Heart Church, Everton (1885–86)
- George Enoch Grayson (Liverpool born); List of works by Grayson and Ould
- Charles Francis Hansom designed the church of St Anne's Edge Hill (1843–1846)
- Philip Hardwick designed the Dock Office at the Albert Dock (1848)
- John Hay (died 1861), (Liverpool based) Holy Trinty, Anfield
- Edward Arthur Heffer (1836–1916) (Liverpool based) designed the Church of Saint Bridget, Wavertree
- Arthur Hill Holme (Liverpool born) designed Liverpool Medical Institution (1836–37) and Music Hall Marlborough House (1853)
- F & G Holme (Liverpool born), Francis Usher Holme (c. 1844 – 1913) and his uncle, George Holme (1822 or 3 – 1915) designed Conservative Club (1880–83); County Sessions House (1882–84) and Hahnemann Homoeopathic Hospital (1887)
- Lewis Hornblower designed 25 Church Street (1858); Sefton Park (1867–1872)
- Edward Kemp designed Anfield Cemetery (1856–63); Newsham Park (1864–68); Stanley Park (1870; Grade II)
- Edmund Kirby (Liverpool born) designed Reform Club (1879) Dale Street
- Charles Littler (fl. 1868) & Charles Lucy (1832–71) (Liverpool Based) designed Alliance Bank Castle St and Entrance Lodges and Chapels Anfield Cemetery
- Henry Francis Lockwood, a joint architect with Thomas Allom of the now-demolished Brownlow Hill infirmary (1842–43)
- Edward William Mountford designed Museum Extension and Central Technical School (1901), William Brown Street
- James O'Byrne (1835–1897), (Liverpool based) designed Our Lady of Mount Carmel Church, Toxteth
- Edward Ould (Liverpool based) partner of George Enoch Grayson
- William Eden Nesfield, designed Village Cross, West Derby (1861–70)
- Wyatt Papworth designed houses and terraces around Prince's Park
- Sir Joseph Paxton involved in the design of Prince's park
- John Loughborough Pearson designed All Saints Church, Speke (1872–75) and the church of St Agnes and St Pancras (1883–85), Toxteth Park
- James Pennethorne worked with Paxton on designs for Prince's Park
- Harold Peto made additions to Gateacre Grange (1883)
- James Picton designed Hargreaves Building (1859); The Temple (1864–65); Fowler's Buildings (1865–69)
- Augustus Welby Northmore Pugin designed St Oswald's Church, Old Swan (1840) and Saint Joseph's Home, Childwall (1845–47)
- E.W. Pugin designed Bishop Eton Monastery (1851–58), Childwall; the church of St Vincent de Paul and its presbytery, St James Street (1856–57); Our Lady of Reconciliation, Vauxhall (1859–60) altered Saint Joseph's Home, Childwall (1866)
- Peter Paul Pugin designed St Sylvester's, Vauxhall (1888–89)
- Thomas Mellard Reade, (Liverpool based), designed Chatsworth School (1874) and Granby Street School (1880), Toxteth
- J.J. Scholes designed the church of St Francis Xavier (1842–87), Salisbury Street, Everton
- Leonard Stokes designed St Clare's Church (1888–90), Arundel Avenue, Sefton Park
- George Gilbert Scott designed the church of St Mary's Church (1853–56), West Derby
- Richard Norman Shaw designed as joint architect Albion House (1895–98) and Parr's Bank (1901), Castle Street
- Henry Shelmerdine (1856–1935) (Liverpool born) brother of Corporation surveyor Thomas Shelmerdine, designed the Exchange Railway Station
- Cornelius Sherlock (Liverpool born) designed the Picton Library (1875–79), Walker Art Gallery (1874–77) with H. H. Vale, extended by Sherlock (1882–84)
- George Edmund Street designed the Church of St Margaret of Antioch (1868–1869); Prince's Road, Toxteth
- Henry Tanner, architect of the General Post Office (1894–99)
- Walter Aubrey Thomas designed Church House (1885); New Zealand House (1893); 81–89 Lord Street, Liverpool (1891) for his Edwardian buildings see next section
- Walter W. Thomas (Liverpool Based), best known for the Philharmonic Dining Rooms
- William Tite designed now demolished offices for Liverpool Lime Street Railway Station in the late 1840s
- Henry Hill Vale (Liverpool born) Walker Art Gallery (1874–77), with Cornelius Sherlock
- Alfred Waterhouse (who was born in Liverpool, designed The Liverpool Seamen's Orphan Institution (1870–75); the Great North Western Hotel (1871); Prudential Building (1885–86) and Victoria Building University of Liverpool (1889–92) and other buildings
- Paul Waterhouse (Son of Alfred) joint architect with his father of Whelan Building, University of Liverpool (1899–1904)
- Aston Webb who designed a Chemical Factory (c.1896) on Concert Square
- Willink & Thicknesse (Liverpool based), William Edward Willink (1856–1920) & Philip Coldwell Thicknesse (1860–1920)
- Percy Worthington joint architect of Ullet Road Unitarian Church (1896–99)
- Thomas Worthington joint architect of Ullet Road Unitarian Church (1896–99)
- Thomas Henry Wyatt, designed the Exchange Buildings (1864–67) on Exchange Flags, demolished in the 1930s

=== Staff & graduates of Liverpool School of Architecture, who designed buildings in the city during the Edwardian and Inter-war period ===
- Professor Frederick Moore Simpson, designed the memorial to Queen Victoria in Derby Square
- Professor Charles Herbert Reilly, designed the Students' Union Building for the University of Liverpool
- Professor Lionel Bailey Budden (BA 1909, MA 1910), designed the Cenotaph in Liverpool
- Professor of Design (1912–14), Stanley Davenport Adshead, redesigned the auditorium of Liverpool Playhouse
- Duncan Alexander Campbell (Cert. Arch. 1906) & Ernest Hardy Honeyburne (Dip. Civic Design 1914) Church of All Souls, Springwood
- Harold Alfred Dod (1890–1965) (BA 1909, MA 1910): Liverpool Athenaeum and the Harold Cohen Library, University of Liverpool
- Ernest Gee (18??–19??) (Cert. Arch. 1910): municipal flats, Muirhead Avenue Clubmoor 1920s
- John Hughes (1903–77) (BArch 1931): joint architect of St Andrew's Gardens
- Charles Anthony Minoprio (1900–88) (BArch 1925 MA 1928) & Hugh Grevile Spencely (1908–83) (BArch 1926 Dip. Civic Design 1928) designed the extension to the School for the Blind in Hardman Street
- Edgar Quiggin (1880–1950) (Cert. Arch. 1899): municipal flats, Muirhead Avenue Clubmoor 1920s
- Herbert James Rowse (1887–1963) (Cert. Arch. 1907): joint architect of India Buildings, Headquarters of Martins Bank, architectural elements of the Queensway Tunnel and The Philharmonic Hall.
- Francis Xavier Velarde (1897–1960) (Dip Arch, 1924): St Matthew's Clubmoor

=== Architects who designed buildings in the city during the Edwardian and Inter-war period ===
- R. Frank Atkinson, Liverpool born, design the Adelphi Hotel
- Reginald Blomfield, Cross of Sacrifice in Anfield Cemetery
- Gerald de Courcy Fraser, probably designed the Littlewoods Pools Building and the post-war Lewis's Building, but in a pre-war style
- Arthur Joseph Davis, joint architect of the Mersey Match Factory
- John Hughes designed St Andrews Gardens
- Sir Edwin Lutyens, architect of the original design for the Metropolitan Cathedral
- Archibald Leitch designed stands at both Goodison Park & Anfield Football Ground
- Frank Matcham, architect of Liverpool Olympia
- Sir Giles Gilbert Scott, architect of Liverpool Anglican Cathedral (1901–78) and Church of St Paul, Derby Lane, Stoneycroft (1913–16)
- John Oldrid Scott designed the church of the Good Shepherd, Carr Lane, Croxteth (1902–03)
- Charles Mewès, joint architect of the Mersey Match Factory
- T Myddleton Shallcross, (Liverpool Based) (fl.1904–05)
- Raymond Unwin designed phase one of Wavertree Garden Suburb.
- Frank Worthington Simon (spent part of his career based in Liverpool) joint architect of the largely demolished Cotton Exchange and of Orleans House
- Walter Aubrey Thomas (Liverpool based), architect of the iconic Royal Liver Building on the Liverpool waterfront;
- Arnold Thornely (Liverpool based), joint architect of India Buildings and of Port of Liverpool Building

=== Architects who designed buildings in the city during the Post-war and late 20th century period ===
- Marks Barfield, Liverpool Watersports Centre
- Gerald Beech (a graduate of University of Liverpool), Sports Pavilion Geoffrey Hughes Athletic Ground, University of Liverpool (1961–62)
- Sir Frederick Gibberd architect of the Metropolitan Cathedral
- George Hall (1926–2016), (Liverpool born, graduate of University of Liverpool) extension to Liverpool Playhouse
- Maxwell Fry, born in Liscard, (a graduate of University of Liverpool), he designed the university's Veterinary Science Building (1958–60)
- William Holford, (a graduate of the University of Liverpool) authored the 1949 plan for the expansion of the University of Liverpool
- Denys Lasdun designed the sports centre University of Liverpool (1963–66)
- James A. Roberts Associates, designed Radio City Tower
- Richard Seifert was the designer of the now-demolished Concourse House
- Adrian Gilbert Scott, rebuilt (1951–57) apart from the tower and spire St Oswald's Church, Old Swan, Liverpool
- Basil Spence, designed the Chadwick Laboratory for the University of Liverpool (1957–59)
- James Stirling, (a graduate of University of Liverpool), designed Tate Liverpool, opened 1988
- Percy Thomas Partnership, designed the Liverpool Women's Hospital (1992–95)
- Yorke Rosenberg Mardall, designed the Engineering Building (1962–65) and the Computer Laboratory (1967–69) both for the University of Liverpool

=== Architects who designed buildings in the city during the 21st century ===
- 3XN, Museum of Liverpool
- Allford Hall Monaghan Morris, Unity Buildings
- Austin-Smith:Lord, remodelling of Liverpool Central Library
- Building Design Partnership, Liverpool One
- Broadway Malyan, Mann Island Buildings
- César Pelli, One Park West
- Haworth Tompkins, rebuilt Everyman Theatre
- Ian Simpson, (educated at Liverpool Polytechnic), Beetham Tower, Liverpool
- Squire and Partners, Hilton Hotel
- Union North, Greenland Street Gallery
- WilkinsonEyre, Liverpool Arena. Jim Eyre (architect) was a graduate of Liverpool University

== Quotes about Liverpool buildings ==
=== St. George's Hall ===
"This magnificent edifice will be a perennial monument of the energy and public spirit, in the nineteenth century, of the people of Liverpool; a place which of all the cities and towns in the British Empire is surpassed only by the metropolis in magnitude, wealth and importance; and which in the quick yet solid growth of its commercial greatness surpasses even the metropolis itself". The Illustrated London News 23rd Sept 1854

"The finest building in the world" Richard Norman Shaw
"The most perfect hall in the world" Charles Dickens
"Worthy of ancient Athens" Queen Victoria
"The finest neo-classical building in Europe" Nikolaus Pevsner
"The combination of a magnificent interior with an even grander exterior is an achievement of which ancient Rome itself could offer no parallel, for however splendid and well organised were the interiors of the great thermae, basilicas and other structures, we have nothing to show that the exteriors of their buildings ever reached the same level of coherence and dignity. Indeed, all the remains point in the other direction. Hence the real greatness of Elmes' achievement". Charles Herbert Reilly
"Judging from his numerous perspective sketches, Elmes had the ability to rapidly design a building in perspective; not only did he prepare numerous sketches of the exterior, but also perspective views of the interior of the great loggia, and various other features. His full-size details, although Classic in spirit, are essentially modern in character; every suite of mouldings received due consideration as to its placing, and its ultimate relation to the scheme as a whole. Nothing could surpass the beauty of the Neo-Grec ornament selected for terminating the dominating attic. The whole building fulfils the highest canons of the academic style, and is unsurpassed by any other modern building in Europe". Albert Richardson

=== Docks ===
"In Liverpool, I beheld long China walls of masonry; vast piers of stone; and a succession of granite-rimmed docks, completely inclosed, and many of them communicating, which almost recalled to mind the great American chain of lakes: Ontario, Erie, St. Clair, Huron, Michigan and Superior. The extent and solidity of these structures seemed equal to what I had read of the old Pyramids of Egypt...In magnitude, cost and durability, the docks of Liverpool, even at the present day surpass all others in the world...For miles, you may walk along that riverside, passing dock after dock, like a chain of immense fortresses..." Herman Melville, Redburn – his first voyage, 1849

=== Albert Dock ===
"For sheer punch, there is little in the early commercial architecture of Europe to emulate it." Nikolaus Pevsner
"the construction is for eternity, not time..." George Holt, 1845

=== Anglican Cathedral ===
"This is one of the great buildings of the world... The impression of vastness, strength and height no words can describe... Suddenly one sees that the greatest art of architecture, that lifts one up and turns one into a king, yet compels reverence, is the art of enclosing space." John Betjeman, BBC broadcast, 1970

=== Oriel Chambers ===
"One of the most remarkable buildings of its date in Europe." Nikolaus Pevsner, South Lancashire (The Buildings of England), 1969, p. 177.

"almost unbelievably ahead of its time", Nikolaus Pevsner, Pioneers of Modern Design, 1949.

"one of the most important buildings in the world" Quentin Hughes Seaport: Architecture and Townscape of Liverpool, 1964

=== St. James's Cemetery ===
"The cemetery was made in 1825–29 inside an abandoned quarry. The choice was a stroke of genius. It makes the cemetery the most romantic in England and forms an ideal foil for the cathedral next to it." Nikolaus Pevsner, South Lancashire (The Buildings of England), 1969

=== The Oratory ===
"one of the purest monuments of the Greek Revival in England", English Heritage

=== Town Hall ===
"Among English civic buildings of its date, Liverpool Town Hall is probably only second to London's Mansion House in its richness...This is probably the grandest such suite of civic rooms in the country, an outstanding and complete example of late Georgian decoration..." Sharples, 2004
"next to those in the Winter Palace in St. Petersburg, the best proportioned rooms in Europe" Prince of Wales, 1881

=== Bank of England ===
"One of the masterpieces of Victorian commercial architecture, and among Cockerell's greatest works... Only three bays wide, but overwhelmingly massive and powerful." Sharples, 2004

=== Martins Bank ===
"This is the most remarkable bank interior in the country, and it would be wise for the chairmen of all the big banks to pay a visit to Liverpool in order to see it." Charles Reilly
"Rowse's masterpiece... and among the very best interwar classical buildings in the country." Sharples, 2004

=== India Buildings ===
"it would not disgrace Fifth Avenue; indeed it would sit there very happily and those who know most of modern architecture will know that this is very high praise." Charles Reilly

=== Princes Road Synagogue ===
"He who has not seen the interior of Princes Road Synagogue in Liverpool has not beheld the glory of Israel." H.A. Meek, The Synagogue, 1995

== Non-extant buildings and structures ==
Structures of particular architectural note which have been demolished or removed include (note: ^{*} indicates buildings which suffered bomb damage during the Second World War, but, in the opinion of some, could have been restored.):

=== Demolished medieval to Stuart buildings ===
Liverpool Castle, slighted after the English Civil War and demolished in the 1720s; St Peter's Church (1704), Church Street, possibly by John Moffat, served as pro-Cathedral from 1880 until the Anglican Cathedral came into use, demolished 1922.

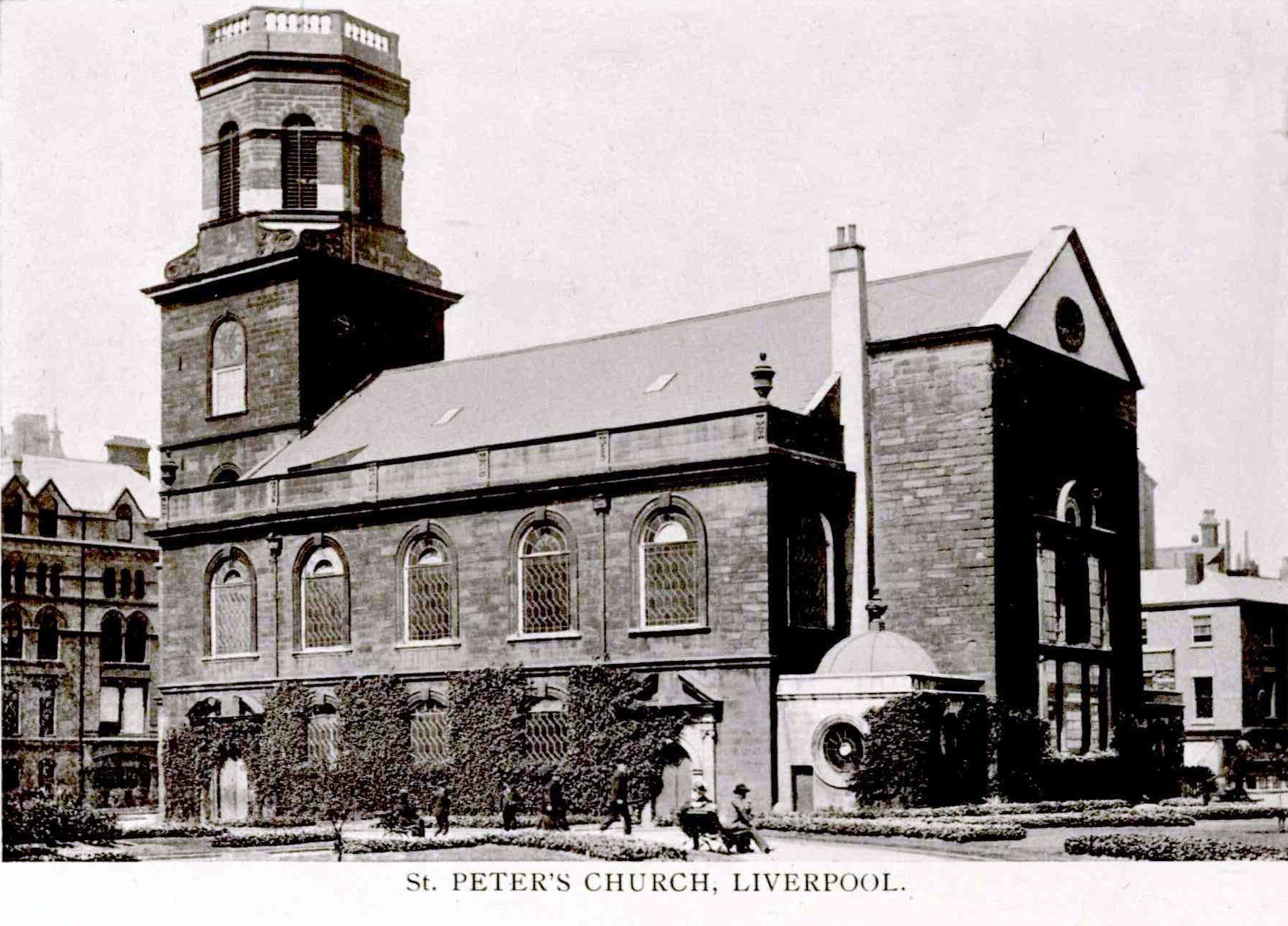
St Peter's Church, Church Street
(1704, demolished 1922)

=== Demolished Georgian buildings ===
The Unitarian Octagon Chapel in Temple Court was built 1763 by Joseph Finney, demolished 1820; Classical styled St Paul's church (1763–69), with a central dome, St Paul's Square, by Timothy Lightoler demolished 1932; one other Georgian church was the Gothic St John's (1775–83), demolished 1898 the former churchyard is now St John's Gardens; The large six-storey Duke's Warehouse (1811) on Duke's Dock, was built to house goods shipped down the Bridgewater Canal and was demolished in the 1960s. Childwall Hall, by John Nash was demolished 1949; a classical villa (1825) for Joseph Yates, used to stand on the edge of the Mersey, in Dingle and was designed by Decimus Burton.

Several buildings by John Foster Sr. have been demolished. Foster was involved in the design of the Borough Gaol (1786), Great Howard Street, closed in 1855 on the opening of Walton Gaol; behind the Town Hall, Exchange Buildings 1803–08 was a large classical style office building possibly a joint work with James Wyatt, demolished and replaced 1864–67 by a building of the same name in French Renaissance style by Thomas Henry Wyatt, and this was in its turn was demolished and replaced by the current building in 1939. The Goree Warehouses built 1810 (the previous building of this name built 1793 burnt down) next to George's Dock, six stories high, bombed during World War II the ruins were demolished in 1958. The Theatre Royal, Williamson Square opened 1772, was designed by William Chambers, remodelled and extended in 1802 by John Foster Sr, demolished in early 1960s. Foster designed the Liverpool Corn Exchange (1807–08) in Brunswick Street, it was later replaced in the 1850s by a larger building.

John Foster Jr. has been particularly unlucky in that many of his finest buildings have been demolished, including the Custom House^{*}, that was one of the largest neoclassical buildings in the city; the second Liverpool Royal Infirmary 1824, demolished 1889; The Royal School for the Blind (1807–12) its chapel designed by Foster was built 1819 in Hardman Street, the chapel was demolished in 1930; and the large St John's Market (1820–22) the building was 183 yards (167 metres) by 45 yards (41 metres), the roof supported by 116 cast-iron columns, replaced by St. John's Shopping Centre; the Moorish Arch, 1831, spanned the railway tracks into Lime Street Station, demolished 1860; the 1836 facade of Lime Street Railway Station lasted about 10 years before the station was rebuilt. St Michaels church (1816–1826), Pitt Street, was a grand classical church with portico and spire rising 203 feet high, costing over £35,000 bombed in 1941. St Georges's Church (1726–34) built on the site of Liverpool Castle by Thomas Steers, rebuilt (1819–22) by Foster, due to subsidence, classical in style, it had an impressive tower and spire demolished 1897 and the Queen Victoria Memorial, Derby Square stands on the site. A third church was St Catherine's (1829–31) on the east side of Abercromby Square, it was bombed during the Second World War and demolished in 1966. On the Pier Head, Foster designed George's Baths a salt-water swimming baths in classical style, opened in 1828, it had separate men's and women's facilities and was the UK's first publicly owned swimming baths, they were demolished c.1907 when George's Dock was filled and the Three Graces built. Foster widened Lord Street in 1826 to four times its original width and created St George's Crescent to link the widened street to Castle Street, the Crescent was destroyed by bombing in World War II.

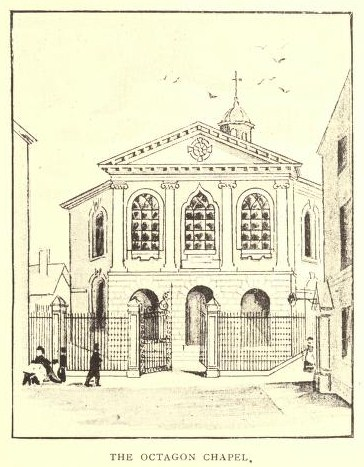
The Octagon Chapel, Temple Court
(1763, demolished 1820)

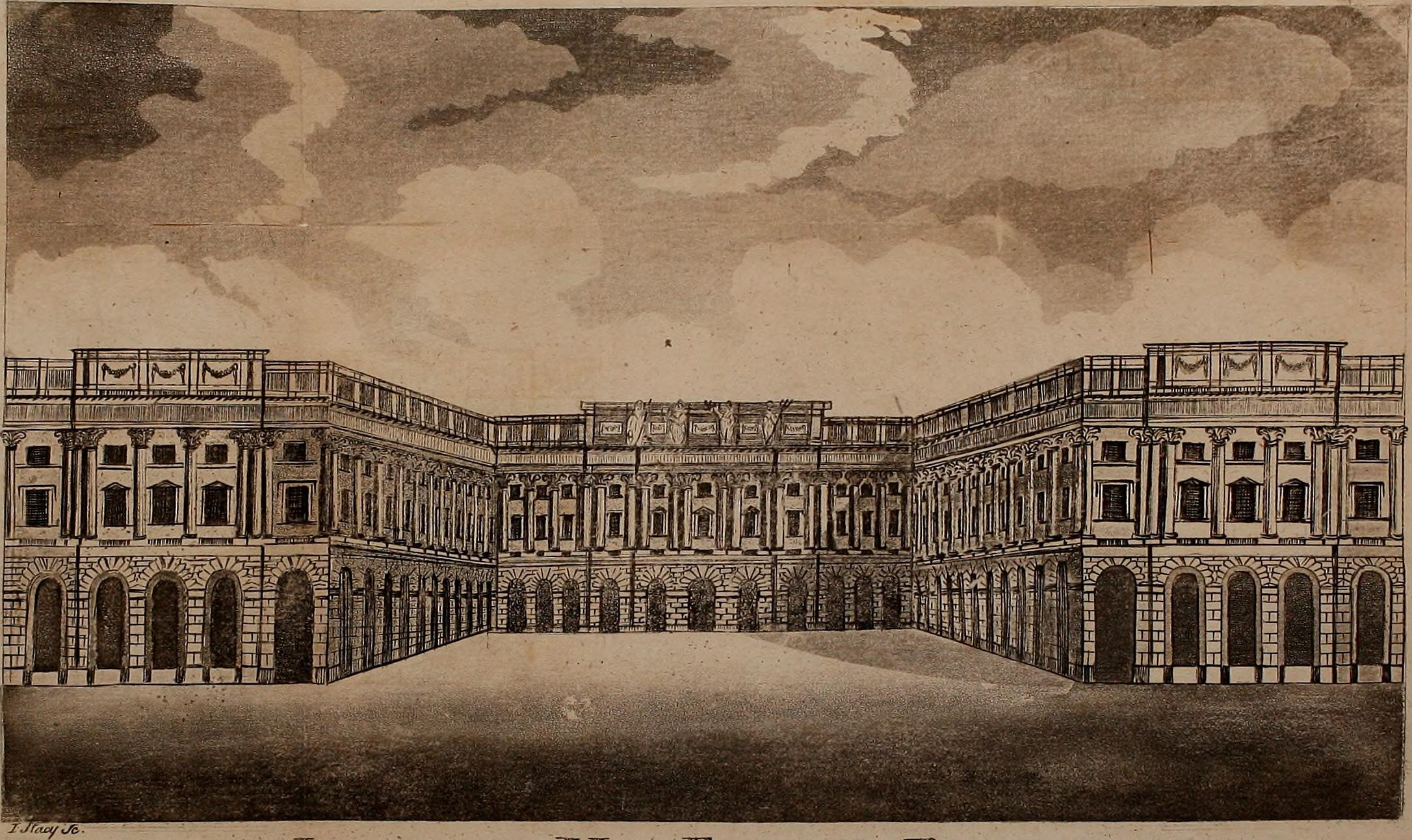
Exchange Buildings
(1803–08; demolished 1864)

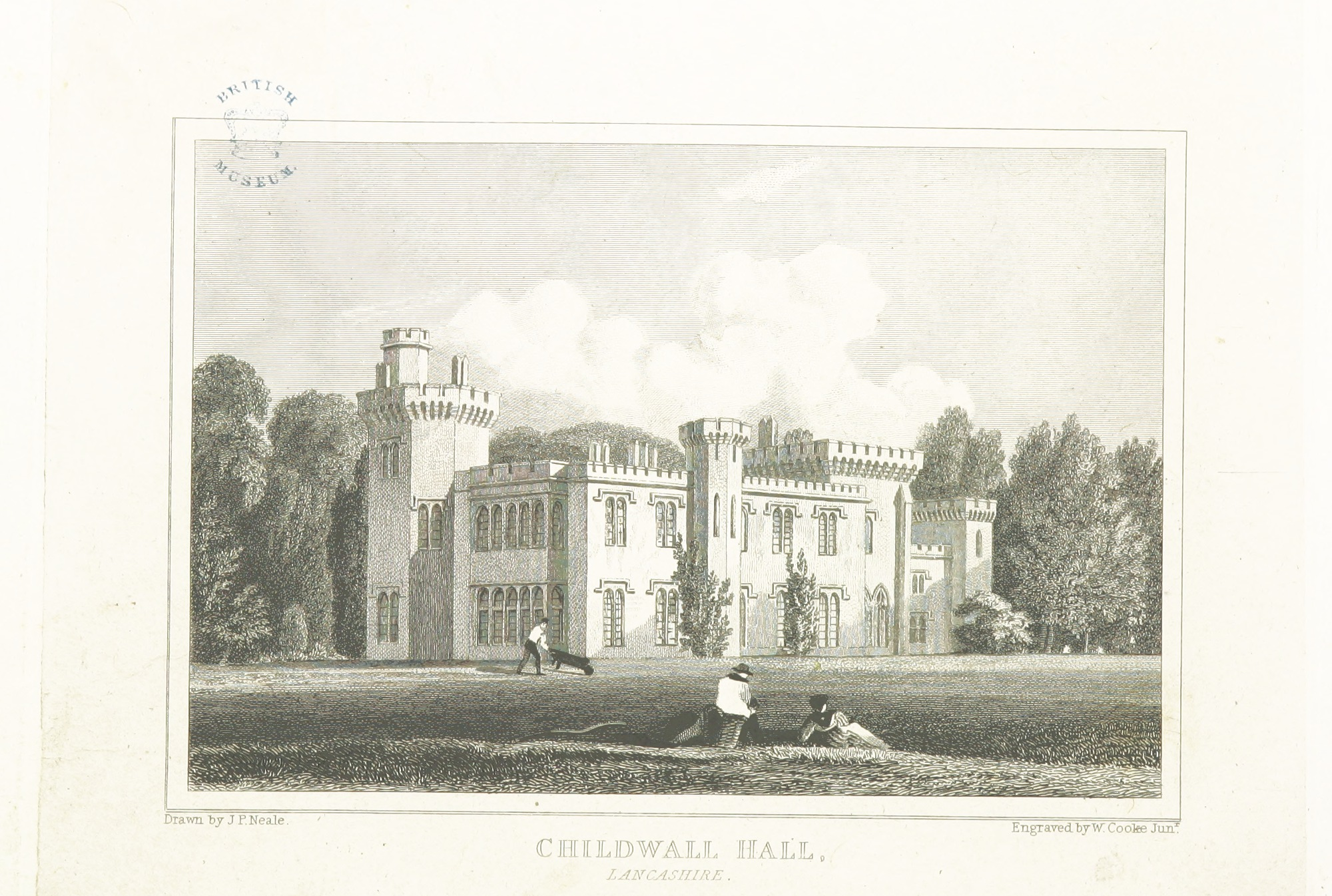
Childwall Hall
(1806; demolished 1949)

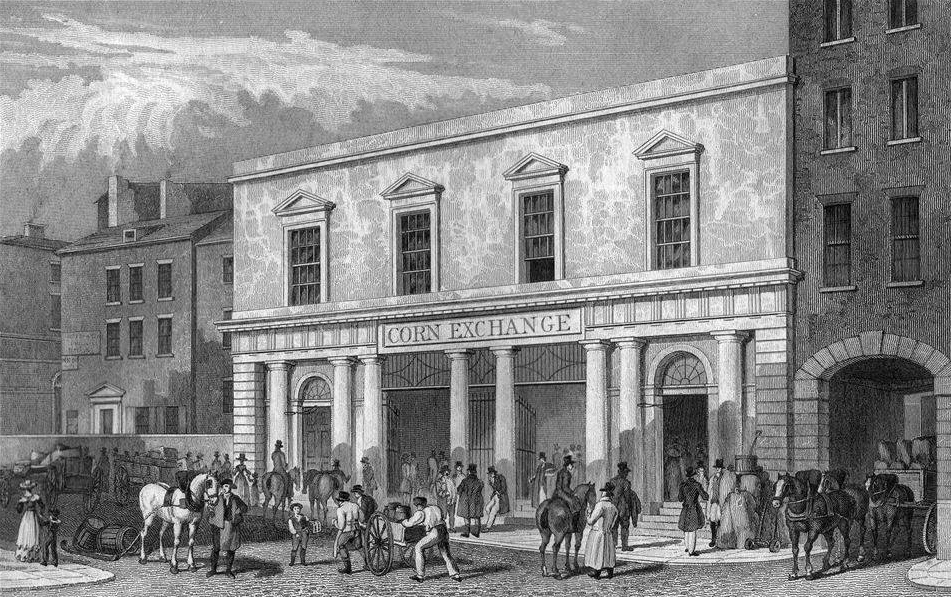
Liverpool Corn Exchange
(1807–08; demolished 1853)

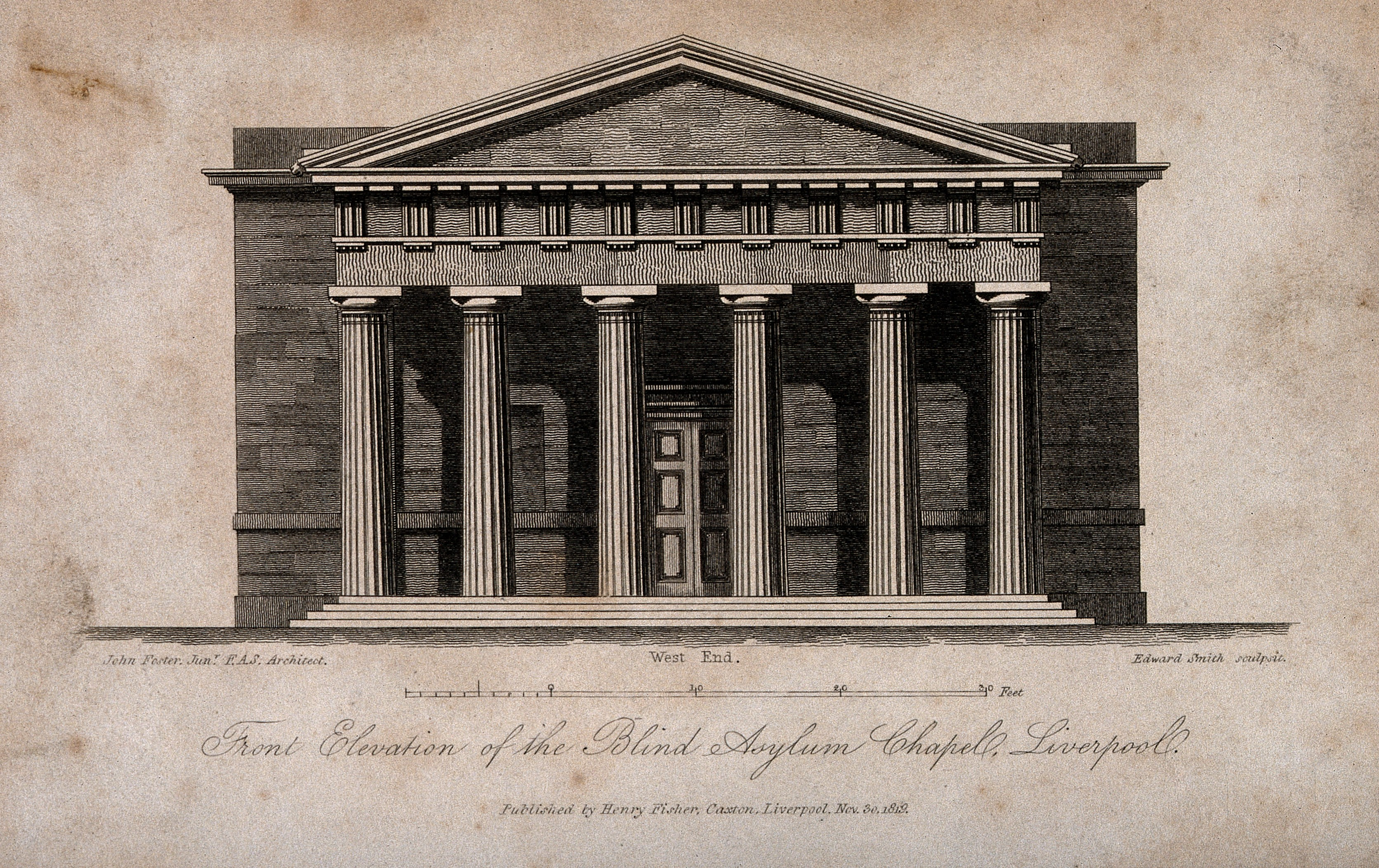
The chapel, Blind Asylum, Hardman Street
(1819; demolished 1930)

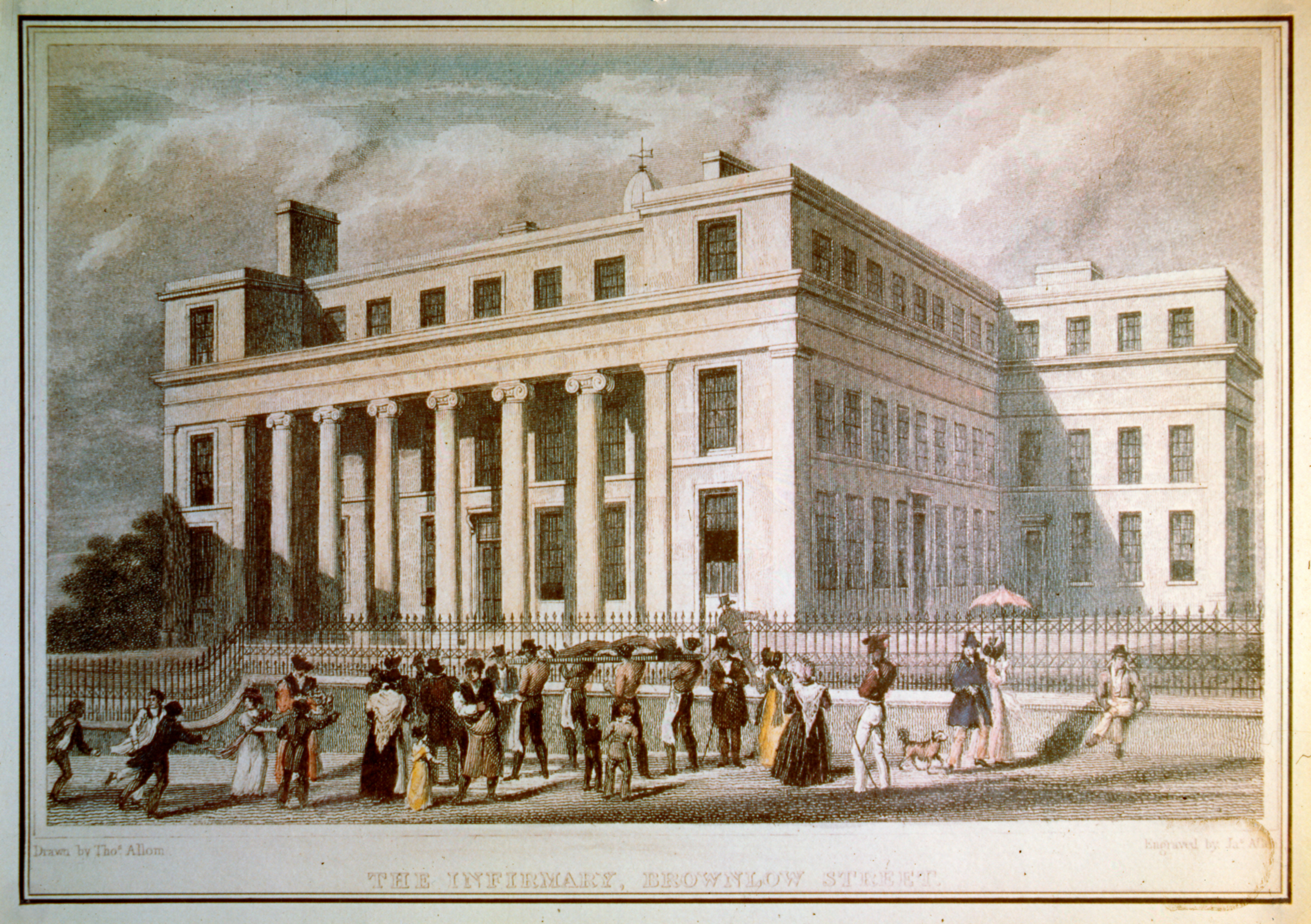
Second Liverpool Royal Infirmary, Brownlow Hill
(1824; demolished 1889)

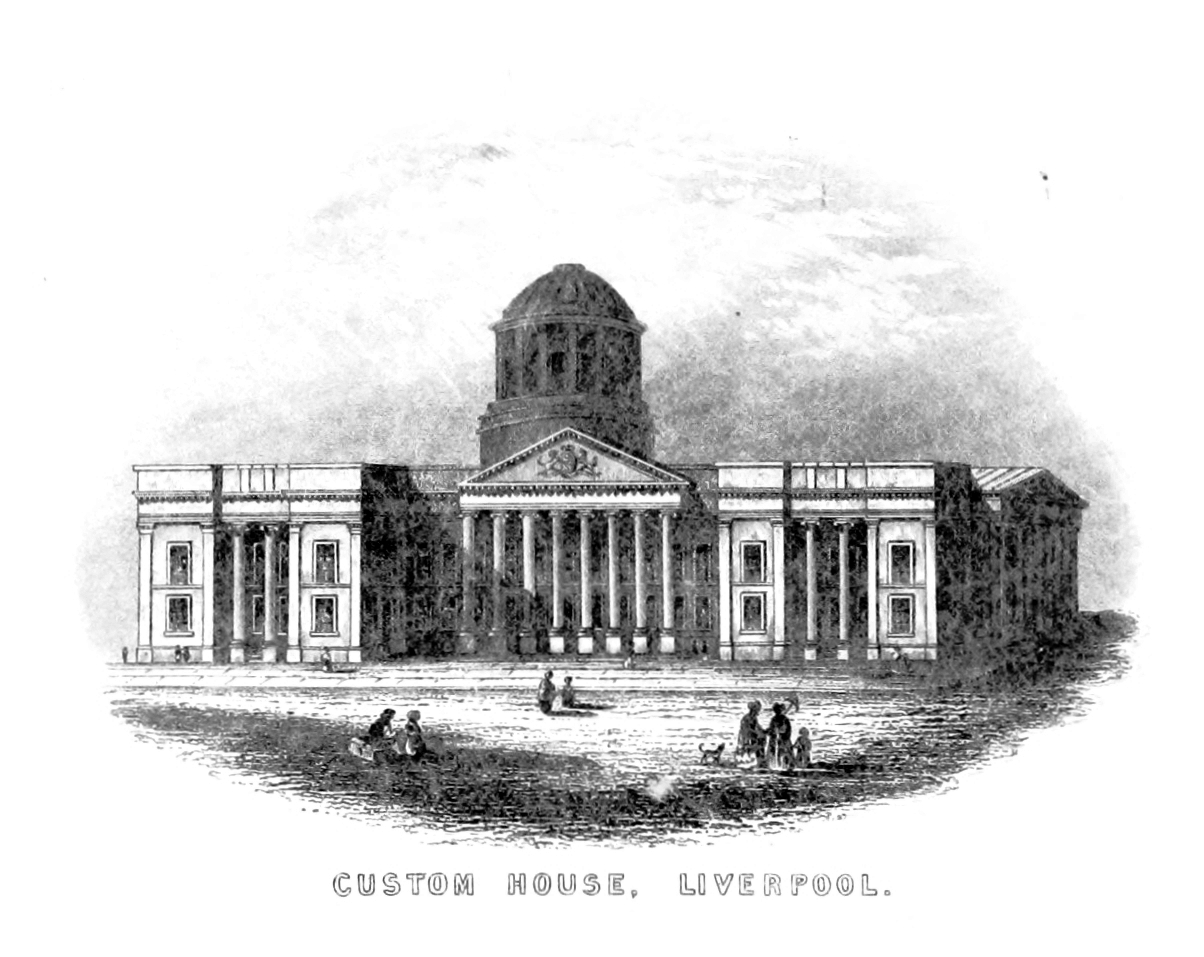
Custom House
(1828–38; bombed 1941, demolished 1946)

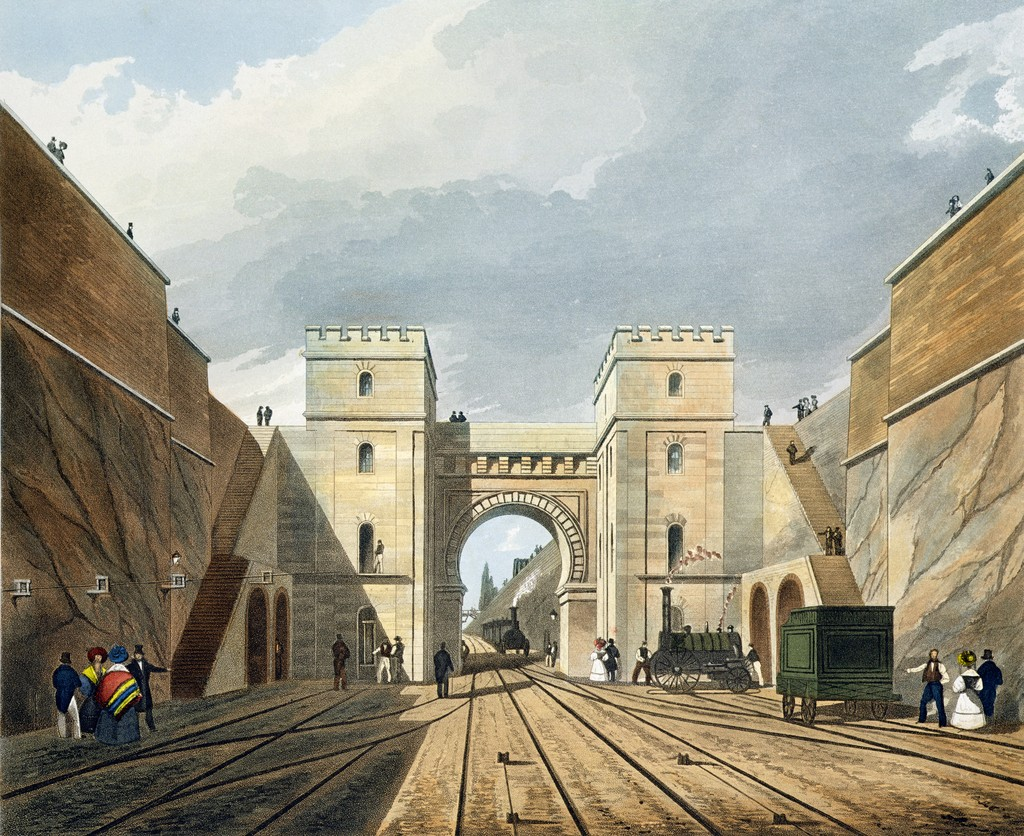
Moorish Arch, Liverpool & Manchester Railway
(1831; demolished 1860)

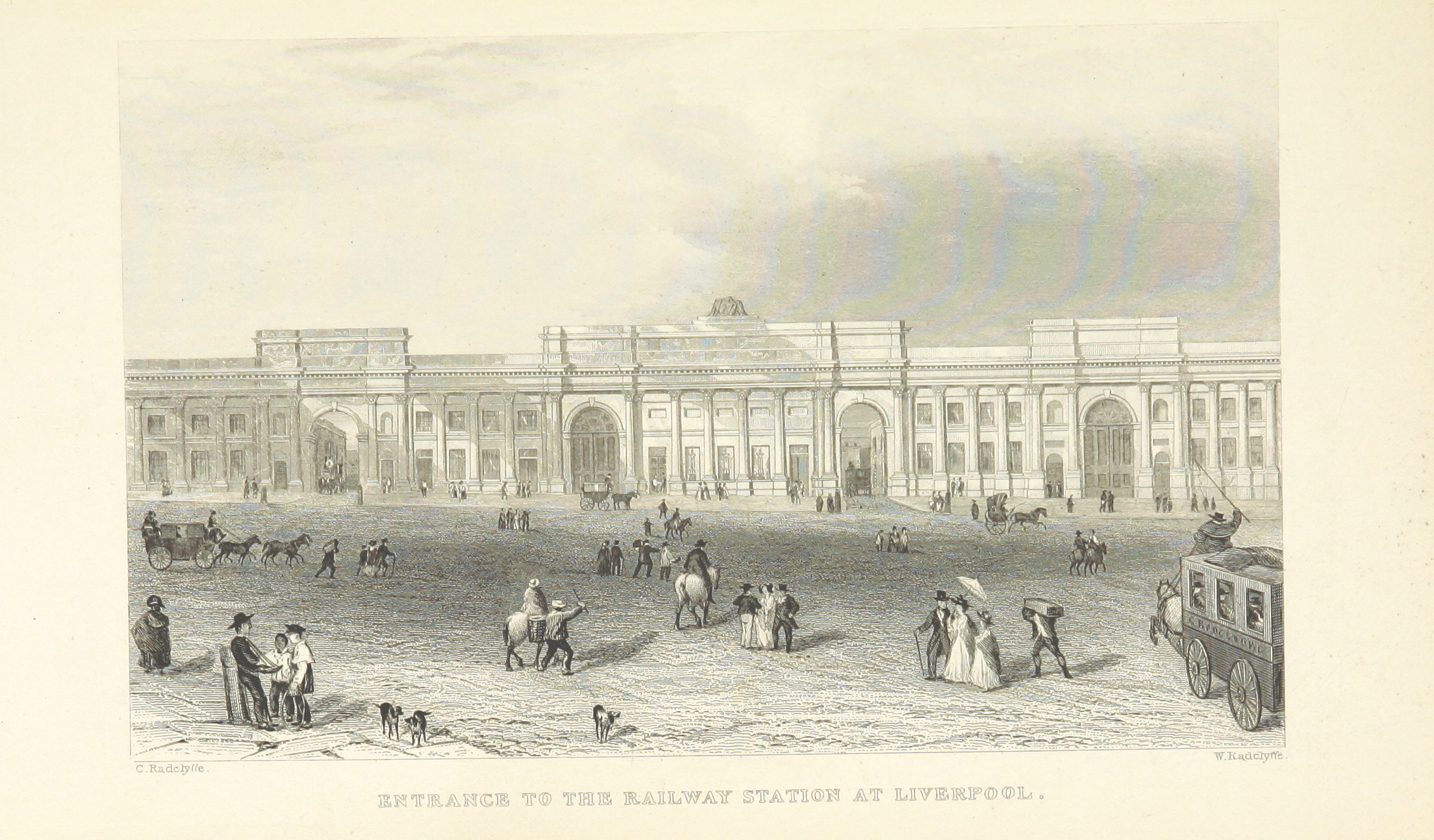
Original Lime Street Railway Station
(1836; demolished 1846–50)

=== Demolished Victorian & Edwardian buildings ===
Brownlow Hill infirmary (1842–43), by Thomas Allom & Henry Francis Lockwood demolished 1932 to make way for the Metropolitan Cathedral; Sailors' Home, John Cunningham architect, in the Jacobethan style; Central Station in the Italianate architecture style; St Margaret's Anglican church, Anfield by W. & J. Audsley, in High Victorian Gothic was demolished in the early 1960s after being burnt out by a fire in 1961; the large Gothic mansion Cleveley in Allerton (1865), by George Gilbert Scott for cotton merchant Joseph Leather was demolished in 1965; the upper floors of the General Post Office by Henry Tanner in the French Renaissance architecture style^{*}; the facade of the Cotton Exchange by Matear & Simon in Baroque Revival architecture style replaced in 1967–69.; Overhead Railway. The Futurist Cinema (1912) was demolished in 2016; Bibby's Warehouse, Great Howard Street, the eleven storey building was Inspired by the Chicago School of Architecture and designed by W. Aubrey Thomas, the grain and processing warehouse was important enough that it continued being constructed during the Great War with completion in 1917, it was demolished in the 1980s.

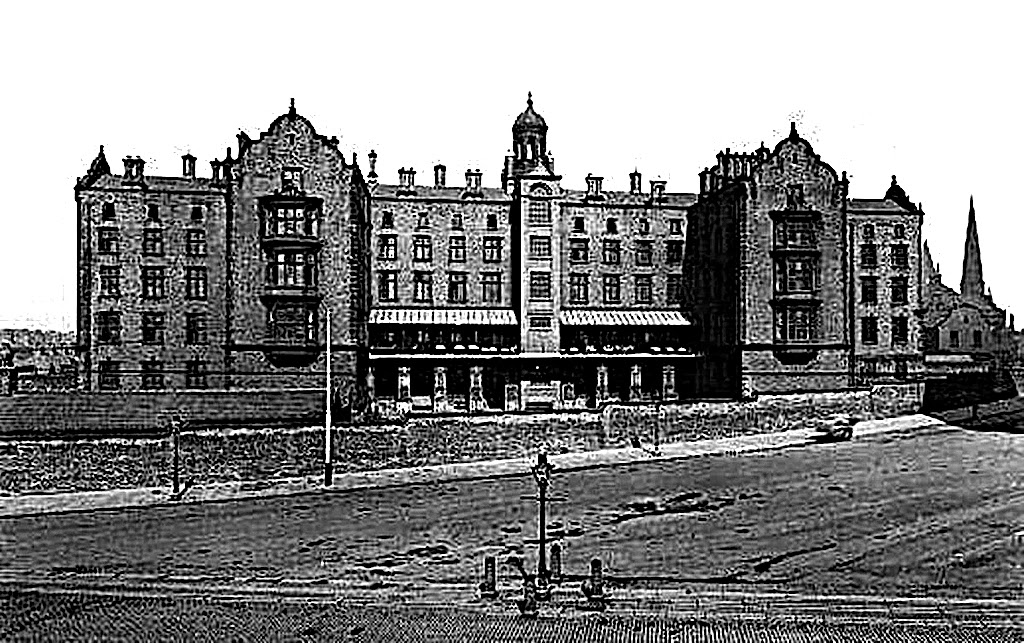
Brownlow Hill infirmary
(1842–43), demolished 1932

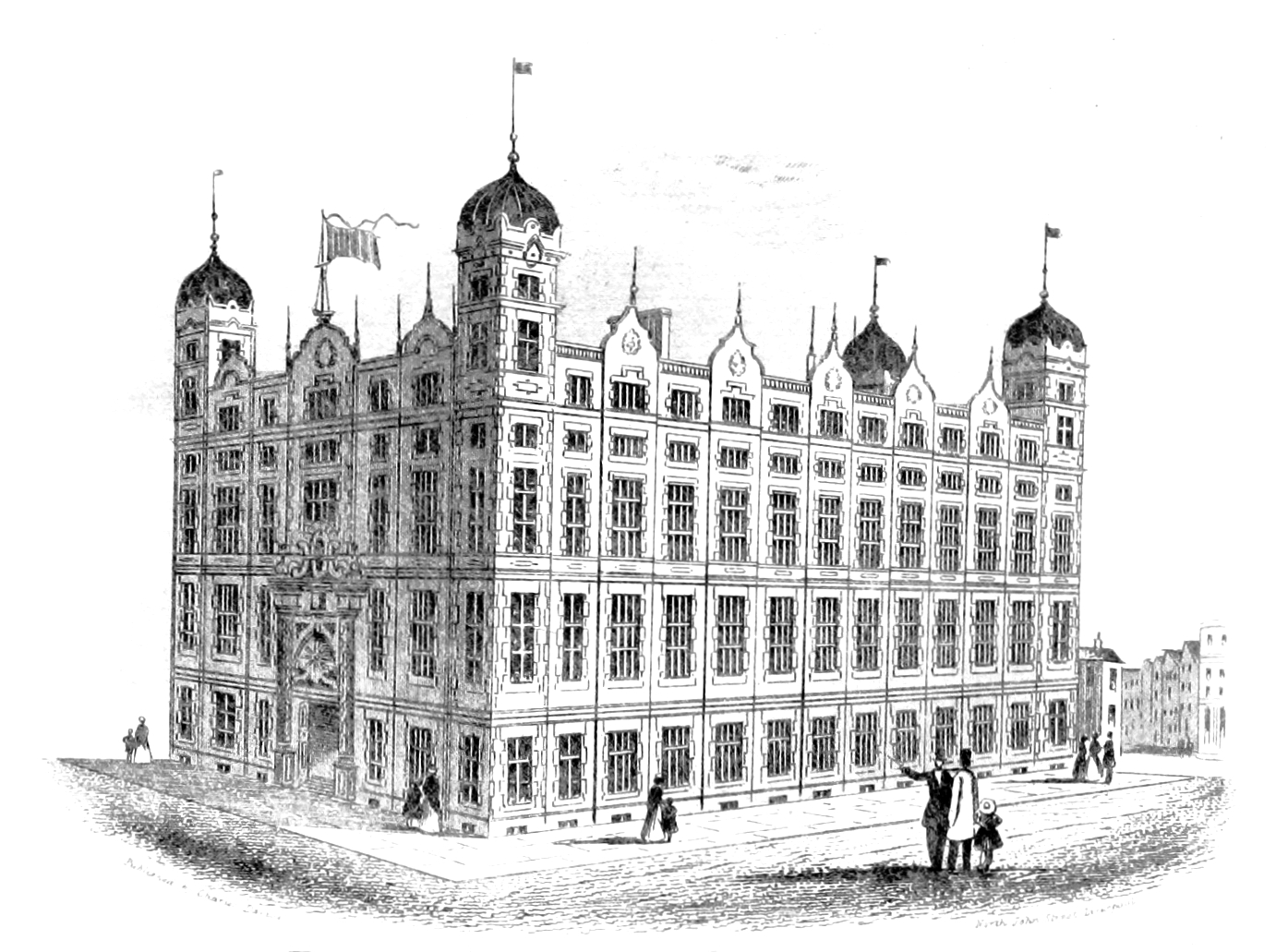
Sailor's Home (interior rebuilt after 1860 fire)
(1846–48; demolished 1973)

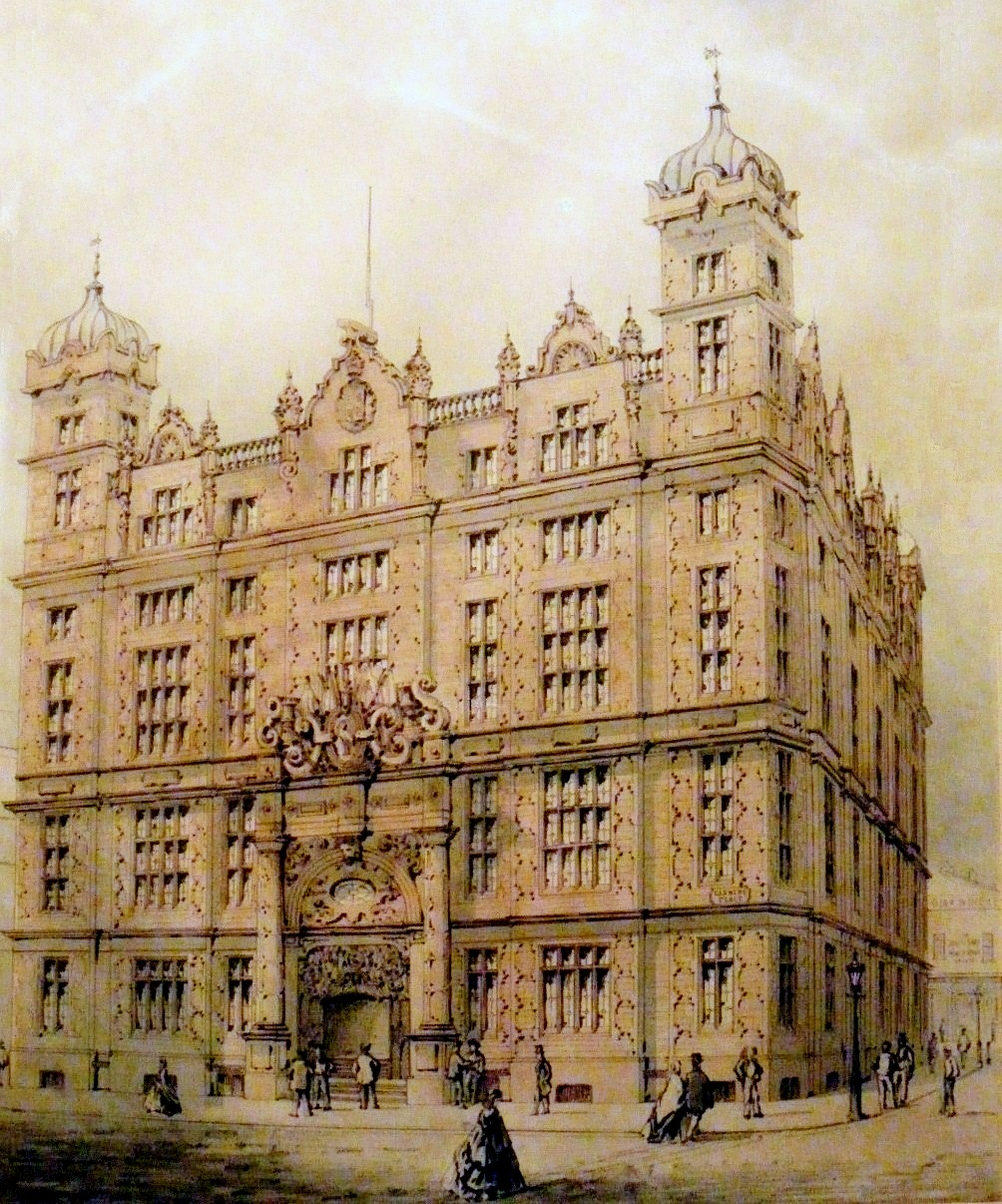
Sailor's Home
(1846–48; demolished 1973)

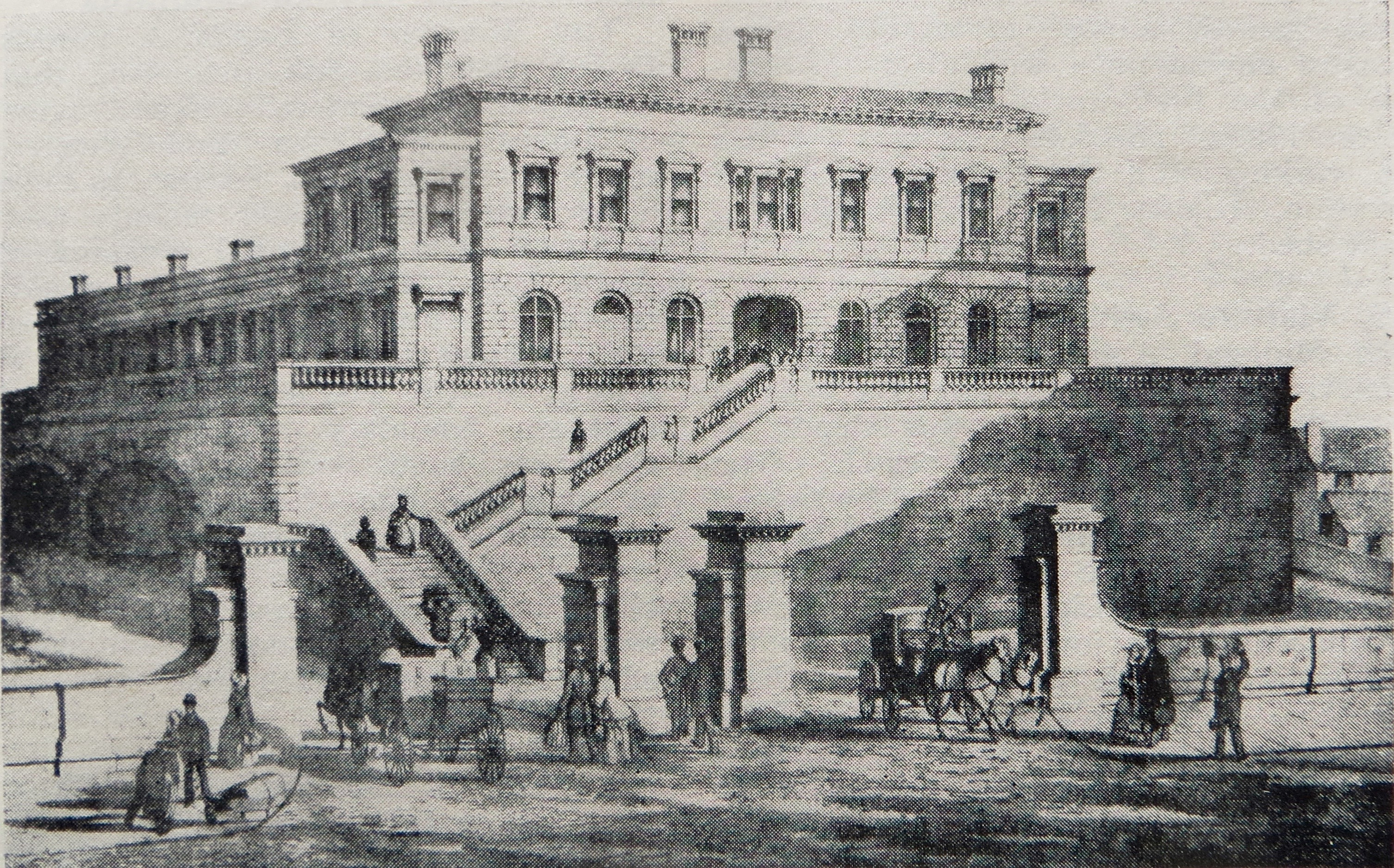
Tithebarn Street Station
(1850; demolished 1884)

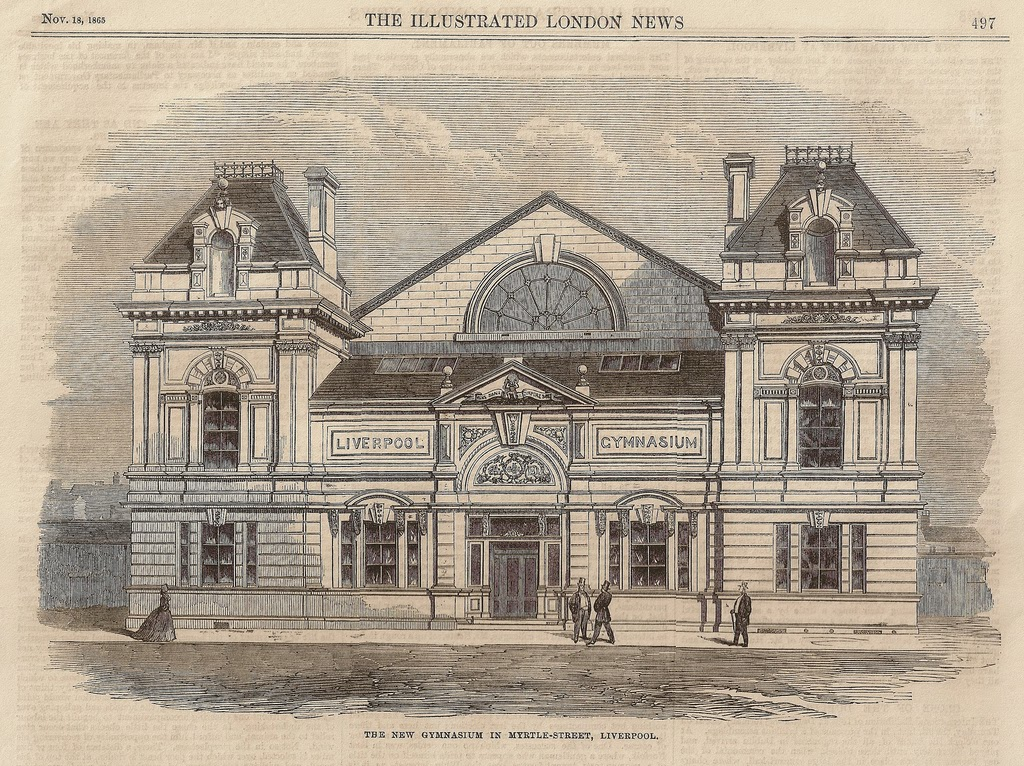
The Liverpool Gymnasium, Myrtle Street
(1865; demolished)

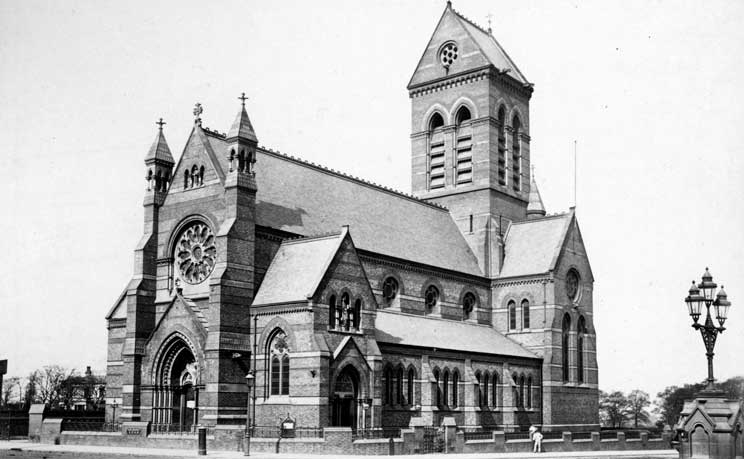
St Margaret's, Belmont Road, Anfield
(1871–73; burnt in 1961, demolished the early 1960s)

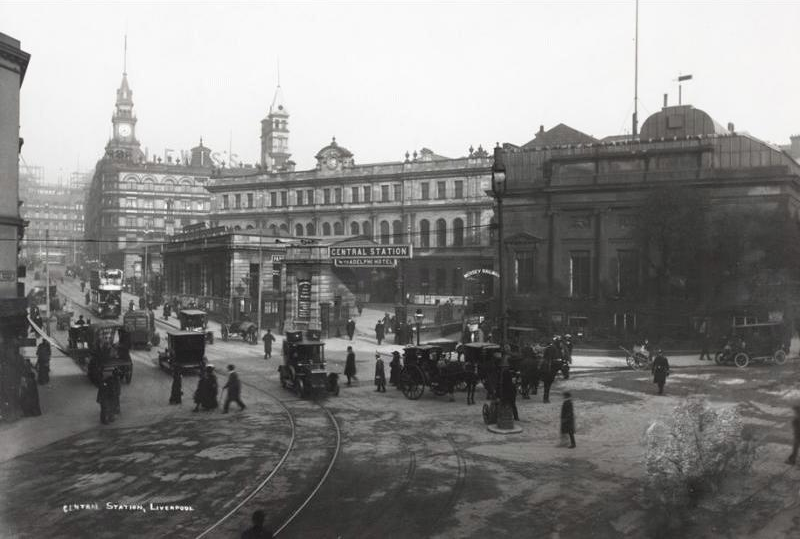
Central Station (1874; demolished the early 1970s)

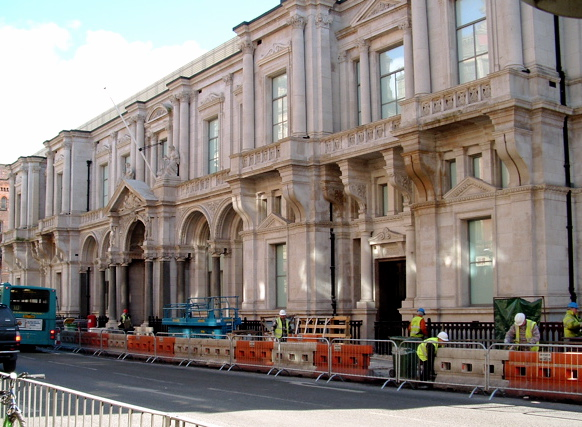
Former General Post Office, upper floors destroyed 1941
(1894–99; unlisted)

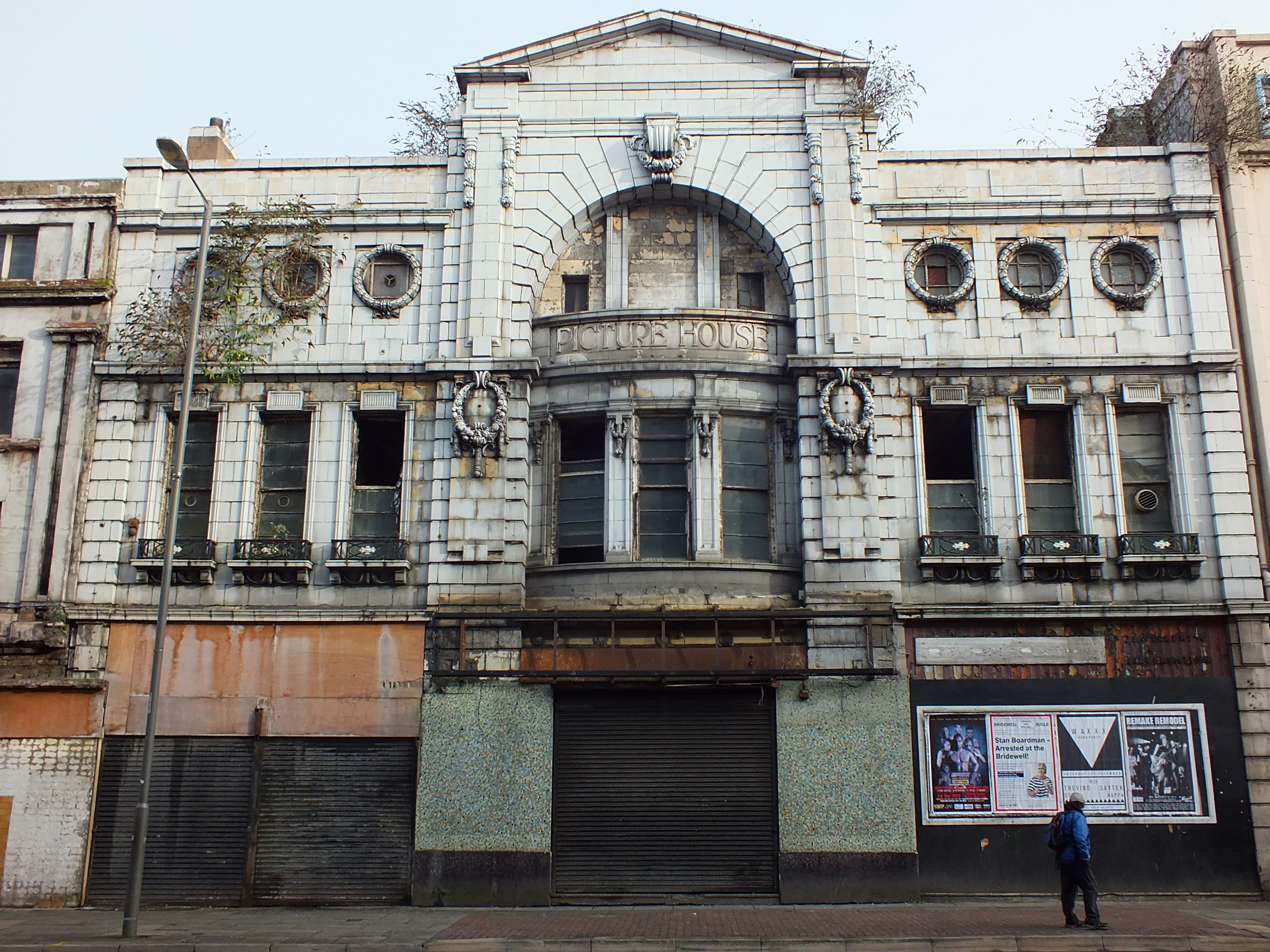
Futurist Cinema, Lime Street
(1912; demolished 2016)

=== Buildings never completed ===
In the 1920s, Liverpool's Catholic Archdiocese conceived a truly Brobdingnagian cathedral – larger than St Peter's, Rome – and commissioned the architect Edwin Lutyens to make the concept a reality. It would have taken 200 years to complete. The Great Depression, the Second World War and Liverpool's subsequent economic decline meant it was never realised – only the crypt was completed – and in the 1960s Frederick Gibberd produced a different, cheap, yet innovative creation which sits atop Lutyen's crypt – Liverpool Metropolitan Cathedral. The Lutyens design had a dome with an internal diameter of 168 feet, from the floor of the cathedral to the top of the cross on the dome would have been 510 feet, its total length would have been 680 feet long and at its widest across the transepts, it would have been 400 feet.

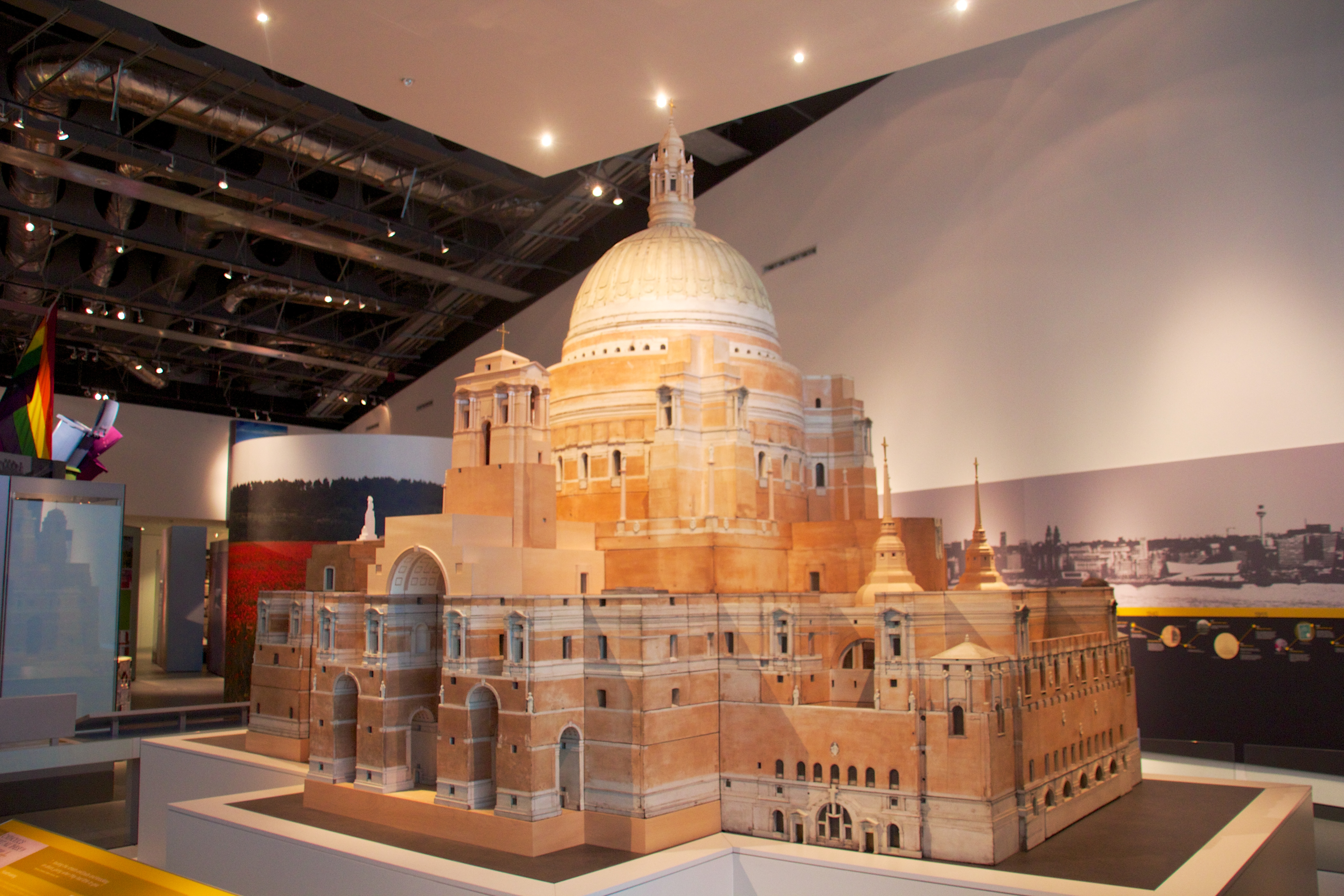
Lutyens's Metropolitan Cathedral, showing chancel

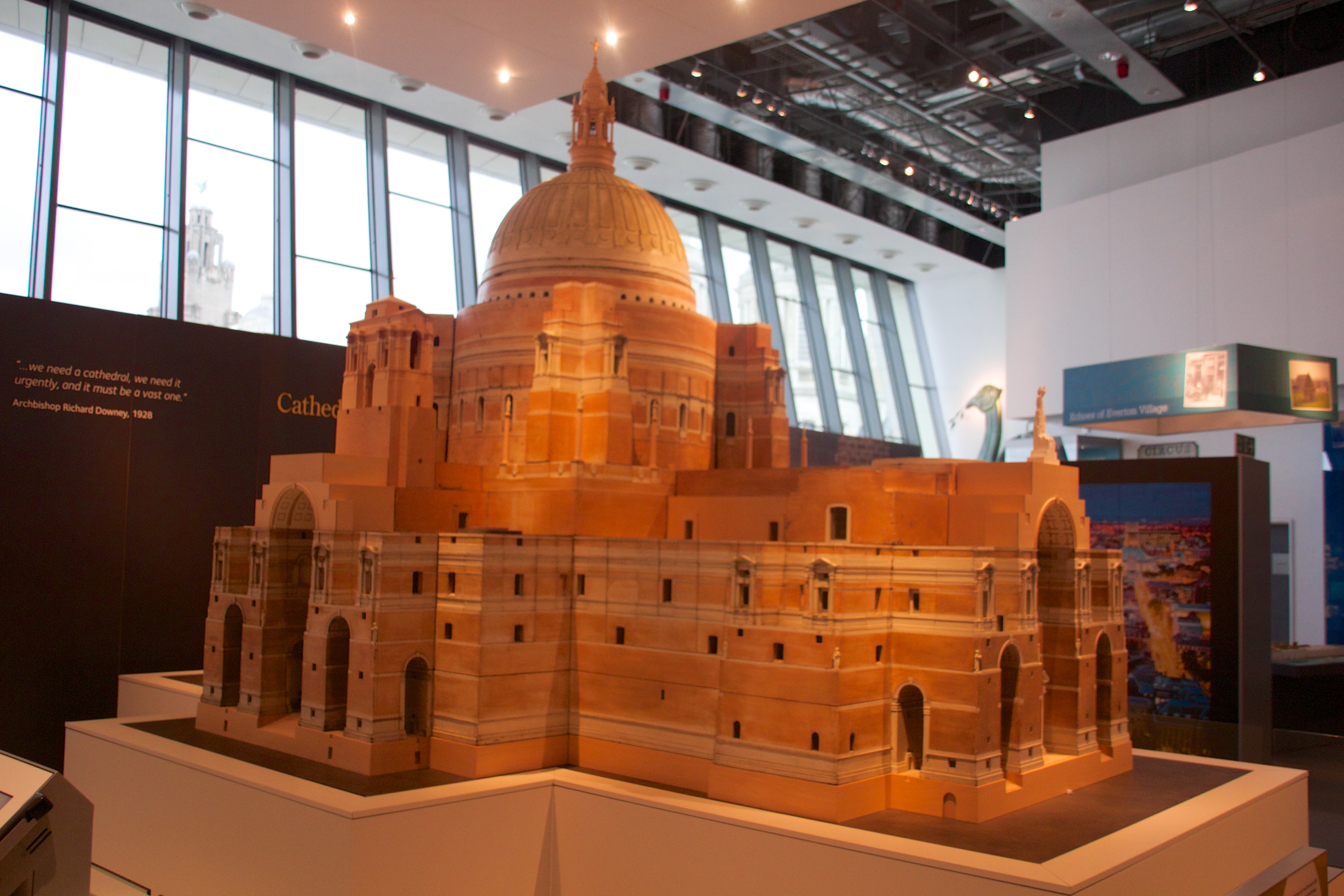
Lutyens's Metropolitan Cathedral, showing main front

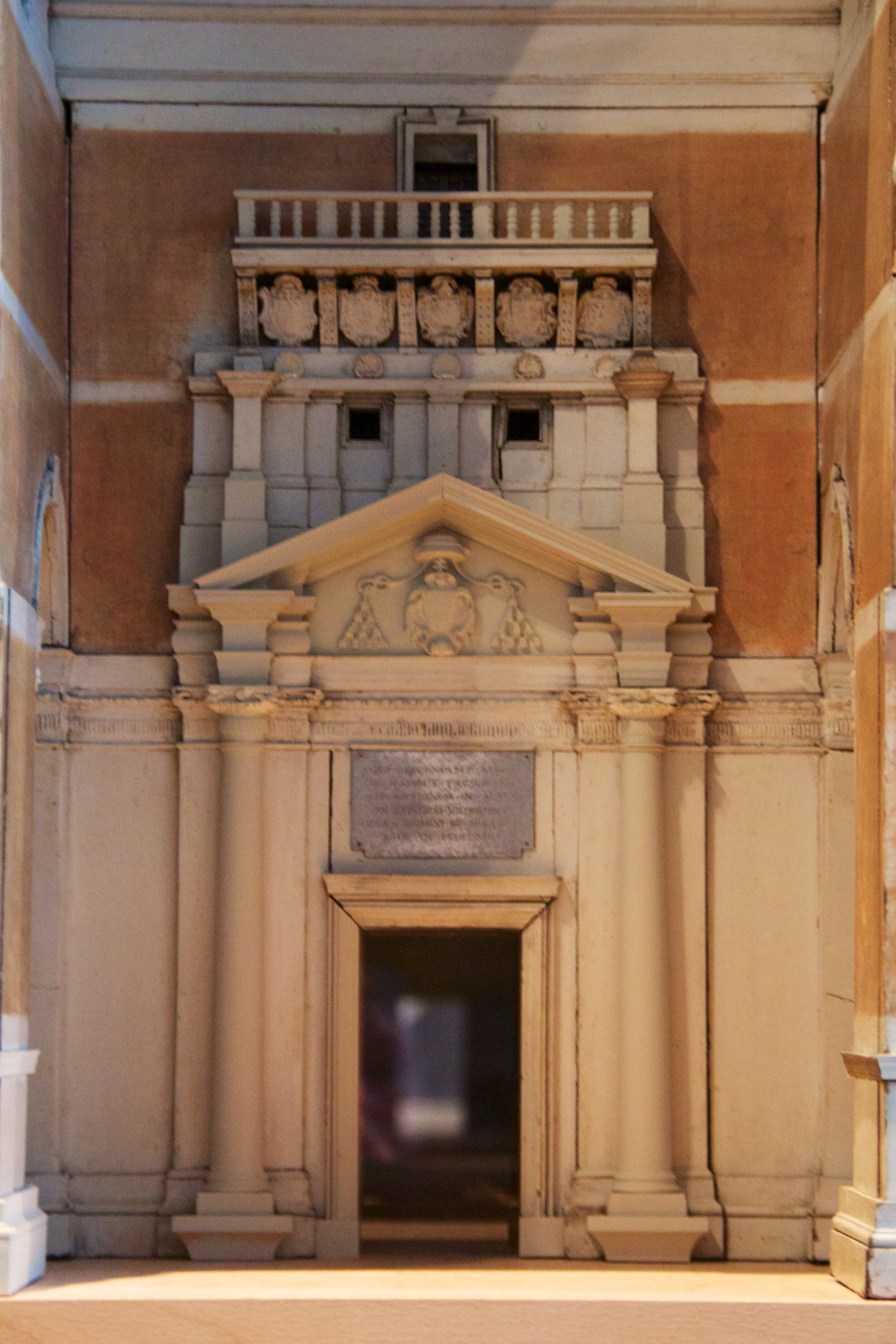
Lutyens's Metropolitan Cathedral, one of the main doors into the transept

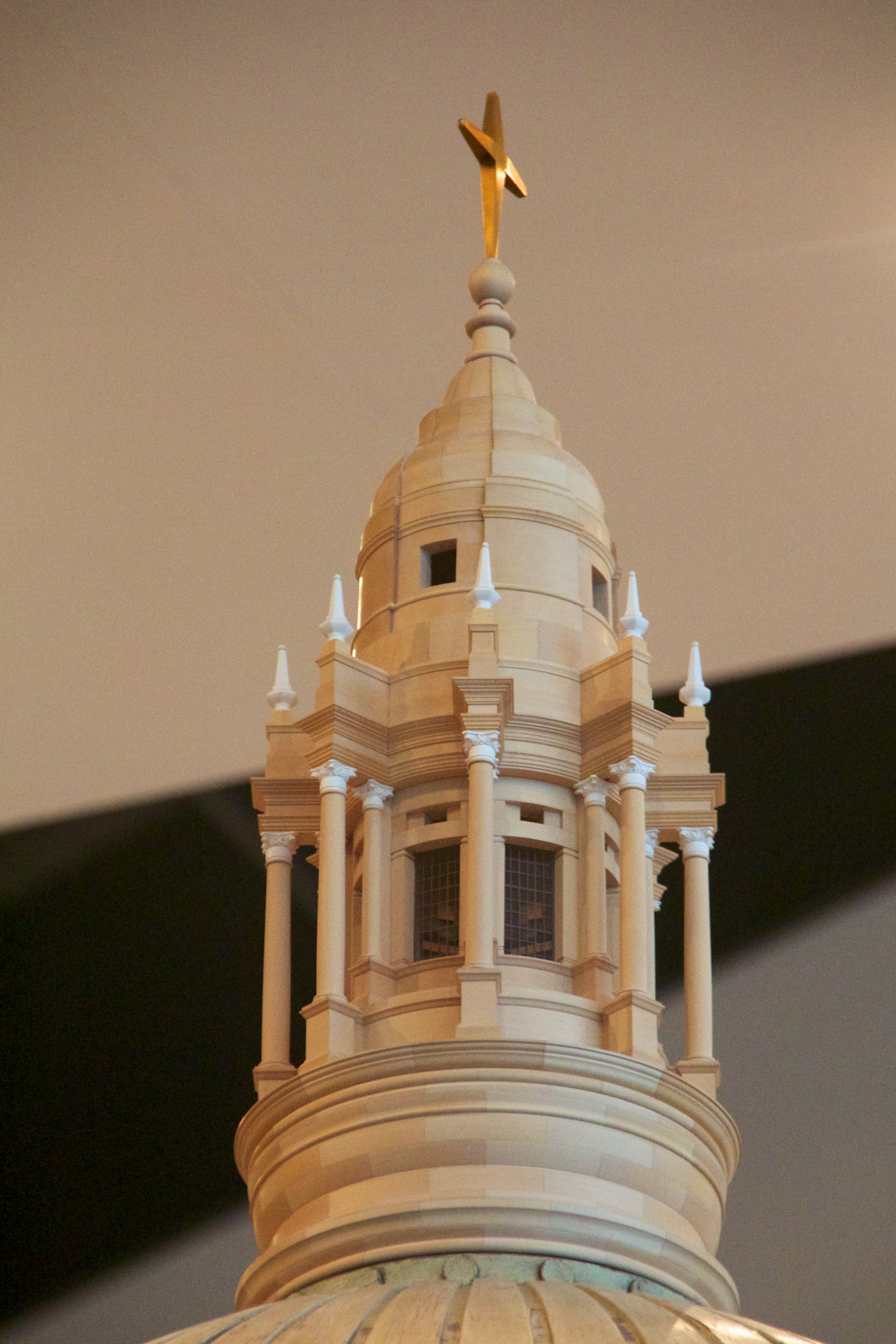
Lutyens's Metropolitan Cathedral, lantern on top of the dome

=== Derelict Liverpool ===
Many fine buildings in Liverpool have sunk into decay, yet have not quite given up the unequal struggle against Nature, or are even being restored. Several authors have noted the Piranesian quality of such sites, which include the Williamson Tunnels, Dingle railway station, Lower Duke Street, St. James Cemetery and the Edge Hill cutting and tunnels.

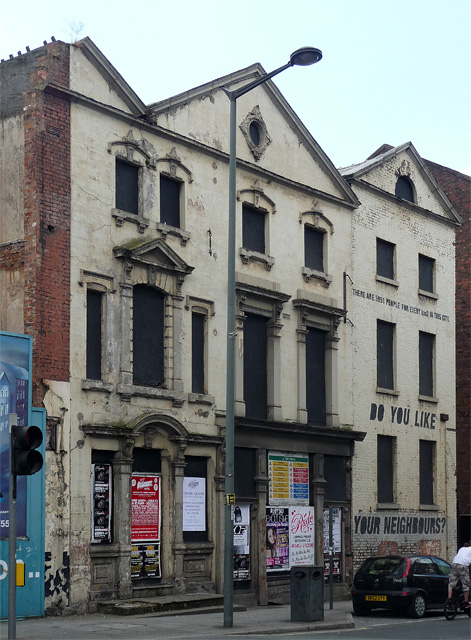
86-90 Duke Street, demolished 2015 and replaced by an office building
(c. 1800)

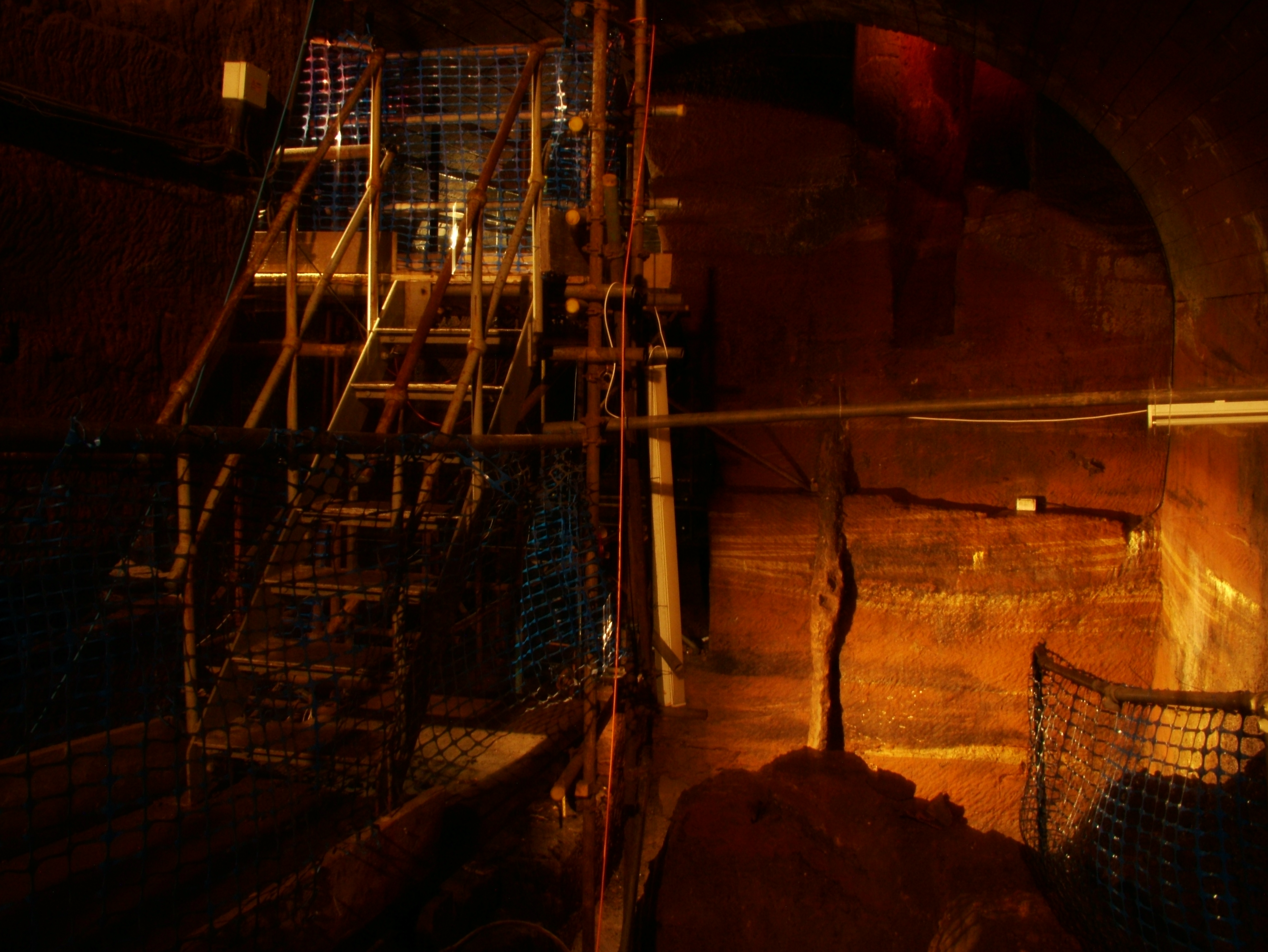
Williamson tunnels (the 1810s-1830s)

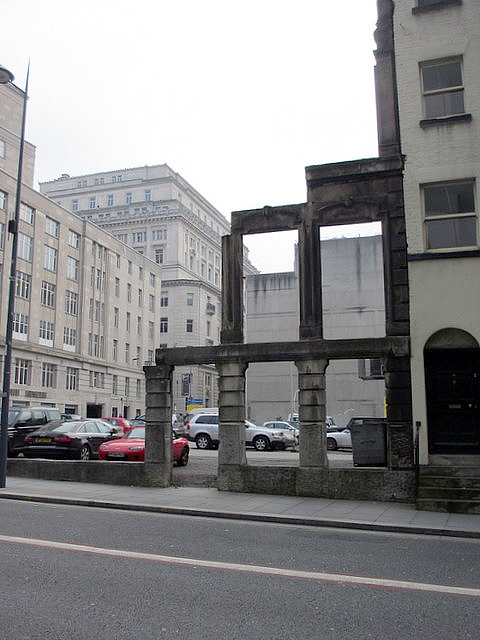
Remnant of Peters' Building, 11 Rumford Street taken from Chapel Street (19th century)

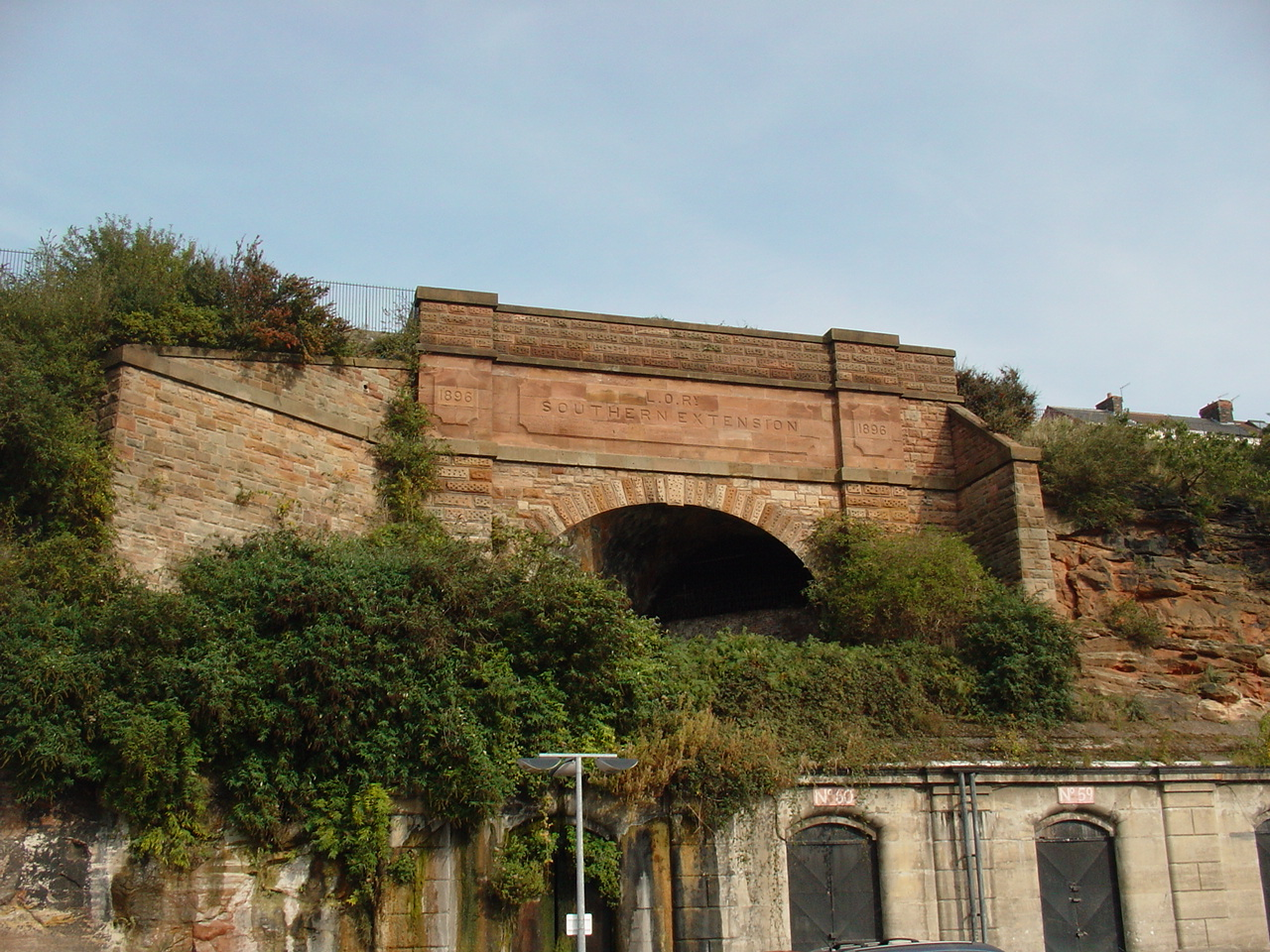
Tunnel for Dingle railway station (1896)

== See also ==
- List of public art in Liverpool
