= Grade II* listed buildings in Merseyside =

Merseyside shown in England

There are over 20,000 Grade II* listed buildings in England. This page is a list of these buildings in the county of Merseyside.

== Knowsley ==
Name	Location	Type	Completed (Note: The date given is the date used by Historic England as significant for the initial building or that of an important part in the structure's description.)	Date designated	Grid ref. (Note: The grid reference is based on the British national grid reference system, sometimes known as OSGB36, used by the Ordnance Survey.) Geo-coordinates	Entry number (Note: The "List Entry Number" is a unique number assigned to each listed building and scheduled monument by Historic England.)	Image
Church of St Mary	Knowsley	Church	1895	28 January 1971	SJ4347495831; 53°27′22″N 2°51′10″W	1253329	Church of St Mary More images
Knowsley Hall	Knowsley	Country House	15th century	9 June 1952	SJ4448193802; 53°26′17″N 2°50′14″W	1253241	Knowsley Hall More images
Church of St Chad	Kirkby, Knowsley	Church	1869 or later	20 June 1975	SJ4083798989; 53°29′03″N 2°53′35″W	1356211	Church of St Chad More images
Church of St Michael	Huyton, Knowsley	Church	14th century	6 June 1951	SJ4426791130; 53°24′50″N 2°50′24″W	1075535	Church of St Michael More images

== Liverpool ==
Name	Location	Type	Completed	Date designated	Grid ref. Geo-coordinates	Entry number	Image
Albion House	Liverpool	Office	1896–98	28 June 1952	SJ3411990211; 53°24′17″N 2°59′33″W	1207759	Albion House More images
Allerton Hall	Liverpool	House	Post 1736	14 March 1975	SJ4158685514; 53°21′48″N 2°52′45″W	1063751	Allerton Hall More images
Allerton Priory	Liverpool	House	1867–70	12 July 1966	SJ4135486233; 53°22′11″N 2°52′58″W	1068415	Allerton Priory More images
Municipal Buildings	Liverpool	Office building	1860–66	12 July 1966	SJ3442990593; 53°24′29″N 2°59′16″W	1068281	Municipal Buildings More images
Barclay's Bank	Liverpool	Bank (financial)	1927–32	12 July 1966	SJ3412390479; 53°24′25″N 2°59′33″W	1062580	Barclay's Bank More images
Bishop Eton Monastery	Liverpool	Chapel	1851–58	12 July 1966	SJ4056288392; 53°23′20″N 2°53′43″W	1218726	Bishop Eton Monastery More images
Bluecoat School	Liverpool	School	1903–06	14 March 1975	SJ3918988794; 53°23′33″N 2°54′57″W	1280374	Bluecoat School More images
Broughton Hall	Liverpool	House	c. 1856	14 March 1975	SJ4120892350; 53°25′29″N 2°53′10″W	1063760	Broughton Hall More images
Carfax	Liverpool	House	Before 1815	28 June 1952	SJ3686887053; 53°22′36″N 2°57′02″W	1073473	Carfax More images
Cedarwood	Woolton, Liverpool	House	1960	25 April 2007	SJ4172887557; 53°22′54″N 2°52′39″W	1391948	Cedarwood More images
Chapel of Bluecoat School	Liverpool	Chapel	1903–06	14 March 1975	SJ3922288787; 53°23′33″N 2°54′55″W	1068325	Chapel of Bluecoat School More images
Chapel of St Patrick	Liverpool	Chapel	1821–27	14 March 1975	SJ3547888806; 53°23′32″N 2°58′18″W	1365832	Chapel of St Patrick More images
Church of Holy Trinity	Liverpool	Church	1794	28 June 1952	SJ3920889020; 53°23′40″N 2°54′56″W	1206149	Church of Holy Trinity More images
Church of St Andrew	Liverpool	Presbyterian Chapel	1823	28 June 1952	SJ3544390008; 53°24′11″N 2°58′21″W	1361913	Church of St Andrew More images
Church of St Margaret	Liverpool	Church	1868–69	12 July 1966	SJ3587889165; 53°23′43″N 2°57′57″W	1292876	Church of St Margaret More images
Church of St Mary	West Derby, Liverpool	Church	1853–56	12 July 1966	SJ3972393346; 53°26′00″N 2°54′31″W	1356273	Church of St Mary More images
Church of St Anne	Liverpool	Church	1836–37	12 July 1966	SJ3818586228; 53°22′09″N 2°55′50″W	1068405	Church of St Anne More images
Church of St Bridget	Liverpool	Church	1872	28 June 1952	SJ3798289273; 53°23′48″N 2°56′03″W	1068396	Church of St Bridget More images
Church of St Christopher	Norris Green, Liverpool	Church	1930–32	16 January 1981	SJ3865994175; 53°26′27″N 2°55′30″W	1070626	Church of St Christopher More images
Church of St Clement	Liverpool	Church	1840–41	14 March 1975	SJ3675989329; 53°23′49″N 2°57′09″W	1356284	Church of St Clement More images
Church of St Dunstan	Liverpool	Church	1886–89	14 March 1975	SJ3735589529; 53°23′56″N 2°56′37″W	1068261	Church of St Dunstan More images
Church of St James	Liverpool	Church	1774–75	19 June 1985	SJ3527789049; 53°23′39″N 2°58′29″W	1209882	Church of St James More images
Church of St Luke	Liverpool	Church (Anglican)	1811–32	28 June 1952	SJ3526489871; 53°24′06″N 2°58′30″W	1280622	Church of St Luke More images
Church of St Matthew and St James	Liverpool	Church	1870–75	14 March 1975	SJ3885687006; 53°22′35″N 2°55′14″W	1361655	Church of St Matthew and St James More images
Church of St Paul	Liverpool	Church	1916	12 July 1966	SJ3927891738; 53°25′08″N 2°54′54″W	1206520	Church of St Paul More images
Church of St Peter	Woolton, Liverpool	Church	1886–87	14 March 1975	SJ4226086918; 53°22′33″N 2°52′10″W	1206167	Church of St Peter More images
Church of St Philip Neri (RC)	Liverpool	Roman Catholic Church	1914–20	25 May 2000	SJ3568989594; 53°23′57″N 2°58′07″W	1380344	Church of St Philip Neri (RC) More images
College of Technology and Museum Extension	Liverpool	Technical College	1896–1909	12 July 1966	SJ3481690803; 53°24′36″N 2°58′55″W	1205724	College of Technology and Museum Extension More images
Cooperative Bank	Liverpool	Bank (financial)	1892	14 March 1975	SJ3422290362; 53°24′21″N 2°59′27″W	1356311	Cooperative Bank More images
Croxteth Hall	Croxteth Country Park, Liverpool	Country House	c. 1575	28 June 1952	SJ4084894340; 53°26′33″N 2°53′31″W	1280299	Croxteth Hall More images
Cunard Building	Georges Pier Head, Liverpool	Office	1913–16	12 July 1966	SJ3392390273; 53°24′18″N 2°59′43″W	1052283	Cunard Building More images
Dairy	Croxteth Country Park, Liverpool	Dairy	1861–70	28 June 1952	SJ4083294175; 53°26′28″N 2°53′32″W	1280284	Upload Photo
Engine House to North of North Range of Edge Hill Station	Liverpool	Engine House	1849	14 October 1974	SJ3717489952; 53°24′09″N 2°56′47″W	1218206	Engine House to North of North Range of Edge Hill Station More images
Former Liverpool Airport Control Tower and Terminal	Liverpool	Hotel	1999–2001	19 June 1985	SJ4146983773; 53°20′51″N 2°52′50″W	1217911	Former Liverpool Airport Control Tower and Terminal More images
Fowler's Buildings	Liverpool	Shop	1866	14 October 1974	SJ3438990456; 53°24′25″N 2°59′18″W	1063294	Fowler's Buildings More images
Greenbank Drive Synagogue	Liverpool	Synagogue	1936	12 May 1983	SJ3831388450; 53°23′21″N 2°55′44″W	1298791	Greenbank Drive Synagogue More images
Picton Reading Room and Hornby Library	Liverpool	Library	1906	28 June 1952	SJ3493490781; 53°24′35″N 2°58′49″W	1359620	Picton Reading Room and Hornby Library More images
Laundry and Laundry Cottage	Croxteth Country Park, Liverpool	House	1864–65	14 March 1975	SJ4099394063; 53°26′24″N 2°53′23″W	1206357	Upload Photo
Liverpool Airport Hangar No. 2	Liverpool	Commercial Office	1999–2003	19 June 1985	SJ4163483775; 53°20′51″N 2°52′42″W	1063325	Liverpool Airport Hangar No. 2 More images
Liverpool Airport Hangar No. 1	Liverpool	Sports Centre	1999–2003	16 June 1985	SJ4131383849; 53°20′54″N 2°52′59″W	1359838	Liverpool Airport Hangar No. 1 More images
Liverpool Collegiate School	Liverpool	School	1843	28 June 1952	SJ3576391132; 53°24′47″N 2°58′04″W	1062538	Liverpool Collegiate School More images
Liverpool Medical Institution	Liverpool	Institute	1836–37	28 June 1952	SJ3567290047; 53°24′12″N 2°58′09″W	1208429	Liverpool Medical Institution More images
Lodge to Bishop Eton Monastery, and adjoining gateway	Liverpool	Lodge and Gateway	c. 1840	14 March 1975	SJ4054688448; 53°23′22″N 2°53′44″W	1063749	Lodge to Bishop Eton Monastery, and adjoining gateway More images
Lodge to St Joseph's Home	Liverpool	Lodge	c. 1840	14 March 1975	SJ4043288490; 53°23′24″N 2°53′50″W	1063748	Upload Photo
Main Bridewell	Liverpool	Wall	1857–59	19 June 1985	SJ3448990726; 53°24′33″N 2°59′13″W	1068316	Main Bridewell More images
Memorial to the Engine Room Heroes of the Titanic	Liverpool	Obelisk	1916	14 March 1975	SJ3374490386; 53°24′22″N 2°59′53″W	1209973	Memorial to the Engine Room Heroes of the Titanic More images
Much Woolton Old School	Woolton, Liverpool	Elementary School	c. 1610	28 June 1952	SJ4245986240; 53°22′12″N 2°51′59″W	1361673	Much Woolton Old School More images
National Westminster Bank	Liverpool	Bank (financial)	1899–1902	28 June 1952	SJ3419790410; 53°24′23″N 2°59′29″W	1205939	National Westminster Bank More images
Nelson Monument	Liverpool	Commemorative Monument	1813	14 March 1975	SJ3415290540; 53°24′27″N 2°59′31″W	1068235	Nelson Monument More images
Olympia Social Club	Liverpool	Bingo Hall	1985	14 March 1975	SJ3645091364; 53°24′55″N 2°57′27″W	1062584	Olympia Social Club More images
Orleans House	Liverpool	Office	1907	14 March 1975	SJ3407390798; 53°24′35″N 2°59′36″W	1206657	Orleans House More images
Palm House	Sefton Park, Liverpool	Palm House	1896	12 July 1966	SJ3788487565; 53°22′53″N 2°56′07″W	1292339	Palm House More images
Philharmonic Hall (including detached poster piers to South West and North West)	Liverpool	Concert Hall	1937–39	19 March 1981	SJ3562589815; 53°24′04″N 2°58′11″W	1279652	Philharmonic Hall (including detached poster piers to South West and North West) More images
Playhouse Theatre	Liverpool	Theatre	1865	14 March 1975	SJ3478290401; 53°24′23″N 2°58′57″W	1218642	Playhouse Theatre More images
Port of Liverpool Building and stone balustrade, iron gates and piers	Georges Pier Head, Liverpool	Offices	1907	12 July 1966	SJ3392290208; 53°24′16″N 2°59′43″W	1068223	Port of Liverpool Building and stone balustrade, iron gates and piers More images
Railings, plinth walls, gates, piers and steps at Church of St Luke	Liverpool	Gate	1829	14 March 1975	SJ3531789861; 53°24′06″N 2°58′28″W	1068380	Railings, plinth walls, gates, piers and steps at Church of St Luke More images
Range on north side of Edge Hill Station	Liverpool	Railway Station	1836	14 October 1974	SJ3715089954; 53°24′10″N 2°56′48″W	1218196	Range on north side of Edge Hill Station More images
Range on south side of Edge Hill Station	Liverpool	Railway Station	1836	14 October 1974	SJ3715189928; 53°24′09″N 2°56′48″W	1063311	Range on south side of Edge Hill Station More images
Liverpool Metropolitan Cathedral	Liverpool	Church	1933–40	14 March 1975	SJ3569490204; 53°24′17″N 2°58′07″W	1070607	Liverpool Metropolitan Cathedral More images
Roman Catholic Church of St Francis Xavier	Liverpool	Roman Catholic Church	1845–49	28 June 1952	SJ3563691165; 53°24′48″N 2°58′11″W	1361668	Roman Catholic Church of St Francis Xavier More images
Roman Catholic Church of St Vincent De Paul	Liverpool	Roman Catholic Church	1856–57	14 March 1975	SJ3500489347; 53°23′49″N 2°58′44″W	1361682	Roman Catholic Church of St Vincent De Paul More images
Royal Insurance Building, Queen Avenue	Liverpool	Commercial Office	1837–39	14 March 1975	SJ3427690450; 53°24′24″N 2°59′24″W	1365827	Royal Insurance Building, Queen Avenue More images
Royal Insurance Building, North John Street	Liverpool	Commercial Office	1903	28 June 1952	SJ3433390522; 53°24′27″N 2°59′21″W	1070582	Royal Insurance Building, North John Street More images
St Agnes' Vicarage	Liverpool	Vicarage	1887	28 June 1952	SJ3759988534; 53°23′24″N 2°56′23″W	1218225	St Agnes' Vicarage More images
St Bride's Church	Liverpool	Church	1830	28 June 1952	SJ3566189375; 53°23′50″N 2°58′09″W	1365835	St Bride's Church More images
St Joseph's Home	Liverpool	House	1845–47	14 March 1975	SJ4044488453; 53°23′22″N 2°53′49″W	1291830	St Joseph's Home More images
Scandinavian Seamen's Church (Gustav Adolf Church)	Liverpool	Church	1883–84	14 March 1975	SJ3464089650; 53°23′59″N 2°59′04″W	1292991	Scandinavian Seamen's Church (Gustav Adolf Church) More images
Sessions House	Liverpool	House	1882–84	14 March 1975	SJ3502290816; 53°24′36″N 2°58′44″W	1063783	Sessions House More images
Stable block to north and west of stable yard	Croxteth Country Park, Liverpool	House	1985	14 March 1975	SJ4082694232; 53°26′29″N 2°53′32″W	1356330	Upload Photo
Stanlawe Grange, the Granary	Liverpool	House	Modern	23 February 1960	SJ3898485773; 53°21′55″N 2°55′06″W	1068443	Stanlawe Grange, the Granary More images
Steble Fountain	Liverpool	Fountain	1879	28 June 1952	SJ3500590752; 53°24′34″N 2°58′45″W	1359621	Steble Fountain More images
Tate & Lyle Sugar Silo	Liverpool	Sugar Silo	1955–57	23 September 1992	SJ3390193491; 53°26′03″N 2°59′47″W	1252955	Tate & Lyle Sugar Silo More images
The Albany	Liverpool	Apartments	1856	12 July 1966	SJ3410090665; 53°24′31″N 2°59′34″W	1208630	The Albany More images
The Carriage House, and gate piers to garden	Liverpool	House	1985	28 June 1952	SJ3691887115; 53°22′38″N 2°56′59″W	1073474	The Carriage House, and gate piers to garden More images
The Cloisters	Liverpool	House	c. 1815	14 March 1975	SJ3682486986; 53°22′33″N 2°57′04″W	1209968	The Cloisters More images
The Friary or the Glebelands	Liverpool	House	Before c. 1815	28 June 1952	SJ3691987015; 53°22′34″N 2°56′59″W	1209952	The Friary or the Glebelands More images
The Hermitage	Liverpool	House	Before 1815	28 June 1952	SJ3688187004; 53°22′34″N 2°57′01″W	1209956	The Hermitage More images
The Lyceum	Liverpool	Lending Library	1802	28 June 1952	SJ3490090186; 53°24′16″N 2°58′50″W	1068383	The Lyceum More images
The Old Court House	Liverpool	Court House	1662	28 June 1952	SJ3963993257; 53°25′57″N 2°54′36″W	1068420	The Old Court House More images
The Vines Public House	Liverpool	Public House	1907	14 March 1975	SJ3506990333; 53°24′21″N 2°58′41″W	1084210	The Vines Public House More images
Tower Building	Liverpool	Shopping Arcade	1906	14 March 1975	SJ3399590439; 53°24′24″N 2°59′40″W	1360220	Tower Building More images
Tue Brook House	Liverpool	Farmhouse	1615	28 June 1952	SJ3856892587; 53°25′35″N 2°55′34″W	1360223	Tue Brook House More images
University Hostel and Greenbank House	Liverpool	House	c. 1787	28 June 1952	SJ3844387979; 53°23′06″N 2°55′37″W	1356362	University Hostel and Greenbank House More images
Village Cross	West Derby, Liverpool	Cross	1861–70	14 March 1975	SJ3964693277; 53°25′58″N 2°54′36″W	1068388	Village Cross More images
Walker Art Gallery	Liverpool	Art Gallery	1874–77	28 June 1952	SJ3497390811; 53°24′36″N 2°58′47″W	1063782	Walker Art Gallery More images
War Memorial at Holy Trinity Church Yard	Liverpool	War memorial		7 February 2001	SJ3920989055; 53°23′41″N 2°54′56″W	1393740	War Memorial at Holy Trinity Church Yard More images
Warehouse at Wapping Dock	Wapping, Liverpool	Warehouse	1856	12 July 1966	SJ3451089362; 53°23′49″N 2°59′11″W	1218449	Warehouse at Wapping Dock More images
Warehouse on north side of dock	Stanley Dock, Liverpool	Warehouse	1848	14 March 1975	SJ3370792158; 53°25′19″N 2°59′56″W	1359841	Warehouse on north side of dock More images
Wellington Column	Liverpool	Statue	1865	28 June 1952	SJ3502990756; 53°24′35″N 2°58′44″W	1063784	Wellington Column More images
Wellington Rooms (now the Irish Centre)	Liverpool	Meeting rooms	1815	28 June 1952	SJ3556590117; 53°24′14″N 2°58′14″W	1208360	Wellington Rooms (now the Irish Centre) More images
William Brown Library and Museum	Liverpool	Museum	1857–60	28 June 1952	SJ3487690799; 53°24′36″N 2°58′52″W	1063781	William Brown Library and Museum More images
8 Brougham Terrace	Liverpool	Mosque	c. 1830	19 June 1965	SJ3625191257; 53°24′52″N 2°57′38″W	1062583	8 Brougham Terrace
16 Cook Street	Liverpool	Courtyard	1866	12 July 1966	SJ3434590391; 53°24′22″N 2°59′21″W	1068298	16 Cook Street More images
3–17 Percy Street	Liverpool	Terrace	c. 1830	28 June 1952	SJ3563489422; 53°23′52″N 2°58′10″W	1072994	3–17 Percy Street More images
8–18 Percy Street	Liverpool	Terrace	c. 1830	28 June 1952	SJ3560389416; 53°23′51″N 2°58′12″W	1208814	8–18 Percy Street More images
20–32 Percy Street	Liverpool	Terrace	c. 1830	28 June 1952	SJ3561389349; 53°23′49″N 2°58′11″W	1072996	20–32 Percy Street More images
1 and 3 Duke Street	Liverpool L1	Shop	Mid to late 20th century	14 March 1975	SJ3459289990; 53°24′10″N 2°59′07″W	1356348	1 and 3 Duke Street More images
98–102, 102a High Street	Liverpool	Terrace	Late 18th century	28 June 1952	SJ3908089440; 53°23′54″N 2°55′01″W	1075181	98–102, 102a High Street More images
62 Rodney Street	Liverpool	House	Late 18th century	28 June 1952	SJ3534489755; 53°24′02″N 2°58′26″W	1072958	62 Rodney Street More images
159–163 Duke Street	Liverpool	Terrace	1765	29 March 1982	SJ3507689763; 53°24′02″N 2°58′41″W	1206596	159–163 Duke Street More images
169 and 171 Duke Street	Liverpool	Terrace	1765	14 March 1975	SJ3509489751; 53°24′02″N 2°58′40″W	1068255	169 and 171 Duke Street More images
24 Hanover Street	Liverpool L1	Warehouse	Early 19th century	14 March 1975	SJ3460089997; 53°24′10″N 2°59′07″W	1343617	24 Hanover Street
26–30 Hanover Street	Liverpool L1	Warehouse	Early 19th century	14 March 1975	SJ3461690006; 53°24′10″N 2°59′06″W	1207399	26–30 Hanover Street More images
1–10 Gambier Terrace	Liverpool	Terrace	c. 1836	28 June 1952	SJ3555089448; 53°23′52″N 2°58′15″W	1068213	1–10 Gambier Terrace More images
West Derby War Memorial	Eccleston	War memorial	1922	15 August 2001	SJ4737393313; 53°26′02″N 2°47′37″W	1389376	West Derby War Memorial More images

== Sefton ==
Name	Location	Type	Completed	Date designated	Grid ref. Geo-coordinates	Entry number	Image
Bootle War Memorial, including flight of steps and flanking stone tablets	Bootle, Sefton	War memorial	1922	23 March 2018	SJ3445294652; 53°32′40″N 2°59′18″W	1283634	Bootle War Memorial, including flight of steps and flanking stone tablets More images
Dovecote and adjoining wall about 57 metres to north of Formby Hall	Formby, Sefton	Dovecote and Garden Wall	Early 18th century	19 July 1966	SD3112409984; 53°34′55″N 3°02′30″W	1199154	Upload Photo
Formby Hall	Formby, Sefton	House	c. 1620	19 July 1966	SD3115609917; 53°34′53″N 3°02′29″W	1343286	Formby Hall More images
Church of the Holy Family adjoining service wing of Ince Blundell Hall	Ince Blundell, Sefton	Parish Church	1858	11 October 1968	SD3267903021; 53°31′10″N 3°01′01″W	1199264	Upload Photo
Garden temple to south west of Ince Blundell Hall	Ince Blundell, Sefton	Garden Temple	c. 1775	11 October 1968	SD3265302950; 53°31′08″N 3°01′02″W	1075871	Upload Photo
Ince Blundell Hall	Ince Blundell, Sefton	House	1720–50	11 October 1968	SD3269503002; 53°31′10″N 3°01′00″W	1199254	Ince Blundell Hall More images
Ince Blundell Old Hall to south west of New Hall	Ince Blundell, Sefton	House	1590–1620	11 October 1968	SD3260802895; 53°31′06″N 3°01′04″W	1075872	Upload Photo
Pantheon adjoining Ince Blundell Hall	Ince Blundell, Sefton	Art Gallery	1802–10	11 October 1968	SD3273502992; 53°31′09″N 3°00′58″W	1075869	Upload Photo
St Catherine's Chapel	Lydiate, Sefton	Chapel	Late 15th or early 16th century	11 October 1968	SD3639104889; 53°32′12″N 2°57′40″W	1199469	St Catherine's Chapel More images
Scotch Piper Inn	Lydiate, Sefton	Public House	Said to date from 1320	11 October 1968	SD3647004845; 53°32′11″N 2°57′36″W	1343315	Scotch Piper Inn More images
Maghull Chapel	Maghull, Sefton	Chapel	Late 13th century	11 October 1968	SD3753401925; 53°30′37″N 2°56′36″W	1199487	Maghull Chapel More images
Barnes Farmhouse	Melling, Sefton	House	1654	11 October 1968	SD3971000389; 53°29′48″N 2°54′37″W	1199766	Upload Photo
Christ Church	Sefton	Church	1891–99	4 July 1952	SJ3214697622; 53°28′15″N 3°01′25″W	1257311	Christ Church More images
Church of Holy Trinity	Southport	Church	1913	15 November 1972	SD3422017534; 53°39′01″N 2°59′48″W	1379697	Church of Holy Trinity More images
Church of St Benet and Chapel House	Netherton, Sefton	House	1793	11 October 1968	SD3588000131; 53°29′38″N 2°58′05″W	1075849	Church of St Benet and Chapel House More images
Crosby Hall	Little Crosby, Sefton	Manor House	Before 1784	4 July 1952	SD3225701484; 53°30′20″N 3°01′22″W	1257734	Crosby Hall More images
Meols Hall	Churchtown, Sefton	House	17th century	15 November 1972	SD3659218333; 53°39′27″N 2°57′39″W	1379553	Meols Hall More images
Merchant Taylors School (Girls). That portion which was the original foundation.	Sefton	School	1620	4 July 1952	SJ3208499415; 53°29′13″N 3°01′30″W	1257528	Merchant Taylors School (Girls). That portion which was the original foundation. More images
HSBC Bank	Southport	Bank (financial)	1888–89	15 November 1972	SD3360317378; 53°38′55″N 3°00′21″W	1379639	HSBC Bank More images
War Memorial obelisk, north-east colonnade, south-west colonnade, Pools of Remembrance and Memorial Garden walls, and cast-iron lamp standards	Southport	War memorial	1923	15 November 1972	SD3371017380; 53°38′55″N 3°00′16″W	1379604	War Memorial obelisk, north-east colonnade, south-west colonnade, Pools of Remembrance and Memorial Garden walls, and cast-iron lamp standards More images
74 Liverpool Road	Birkdale, Sefton	Farmhouse	Early/Mid 17th century	16 May 1973	SD3319315425; 53°37′52″N 3°00′42″W	1379603	74 Liverpool Road More images

== St Helens ==
Name	Location	Type	Completed	Date designated	Grid ref. Geo-coordinates	Entry number	Image
Birchley Hall	Billinge Chapel End, St Helens	House	1594	23 August 1966	SJ5241999817; 53°29′34″N 2°43′07″W	1343273	Birchley Hall More images
Church of St Aidan	Billinge Chapel End, St Helens	Church	1718	23 August 1966	SD5332600697; 53°30′03″N 2°42′18″W	1075923	Church of St Aidan More images
Adjacent ruins at Scholes House	Eccleston, St Helens	Friary	Pre 1681	28 January 1971	SJ4898593406; 53°26′06″N 2°46′10″W	1261890	Upload Photo
Effigy pedestal in garden of Scholes House	Eccleston, St Helens	Shrine		28 May 1958	SJ4896693372; 53°26′05″N 2°46′11″W	1253239	Upload Photo
Scholes House	Eccleston, St Helens	Farmhouse	16th century	28 May 1958	SJ4897393395; 53°26′05″N 2°46′10″W	1253238	Upload Photo
Guildhall Farmhouse	Rainford, St Helens	Farmhouse	1629	24 March 1966	SD5114400211; 53°29′47″N 2°44′17″W	1075904	Guildhall Farmhouse More images
Manor Farmhouse	Rainhill, St Helens	Farmhouse	14th century	28 May 1958	SJ4998090120; 53°24′20″N 2°45′14″W	1253349	Manor Farmhouse More images
Old Hall Farmhouse	Rainhill, St Helens	Farmhouse	19th century	9 June 1952	SJ4897690254; 53°24′24″N 2°46′08″W	1253242	Upload Photo
Entrance archway to Randall's Nursery	Newton-le-Willows	Arch	Early 19th century	12 February 1981	SJ5881895898; 53°27′30″N 2°37′18″W	1198958	Entrance archway to Randall's Nursery More images
Ruins of Windleshaw Abbey in Roman Catholic Cemetery (chapel of St Thomas of Canterbury)	St Helens	Chantry Chapel	c. 1453	11 September 1951	SJ4996296958; 53°28′01″N 2°45′19″W	1199094	Ruins of Windleshaw Abbey in Roman Catholic Cemetery (chapel of St Thomas of Canterbury) More images
Statue of Queen Victoria	St Helens	Statue	1906	12 December 1984	SJ5126195476; 53°27′14″N 2°44′08″W	1075878	Statue of Queen Victoria More images
Tank House, beside canal at Crown Glass Works	St Helens	Glass Works	1883	23 August 1985	SJ5121495014; 53°26′59″N 2°44′10″W	1075879	Tank House, beside canal at Crown Glass Works More images
159, 161 and 163 Crow Lane East	Newton-le-Willows	Cruck House	16th century	3 February 1966	SJ5820095685; 53°27′22″N 2°37′51″W	1343246	159, 161 and 163 Crow Lane East More images

== Wirral ==
Name	Location	Type	Completed	Date designated	Grid ref. Geo-coordinates	Entry number	Image
Bidston Hall	Bidston, Wirral	House	Earlier core	29 July 1950	SJ2854690207; 53°24′14″N 3°04′34″W	1292202	Bidston Hall More images
Wall and gateway to Bidston Hall	Bidston, Wirral	House	Late 16th century	28 March 1974	SJ2851490206; 53°24′14″N 3°04′36″W	1201577	Wall and gateway to Bidston Hall More images
Bidston Windmill	Bidston, Wirral	Windmill	Late 18th century	29 July 1950	SJ2872689366; 53°23′47″N 3°04′24″W	1282506	Bidston Windmill More images
Chapter House Chapel at Birkenhead Priory	Wirral	Chapter House	Late 12th century	29 July 1950	SJ3282988558; 53°23′22″N 3°00′41″W	1218733	Chapter House Chapel at Birkenhead Priory More images
Christ Church	Port Sunlight, Wirral	United Reformed Church	1904	20 December 1965	SJ3384384525; 53°21′12″N 2°59′43″W	1075492	Christ Church More images
Church of St Bartholomew	Thurstaston, Wirral	Lych Gate	1900	15 November 1962	SJ2473184114; 53°20′55″N 3°07′56″W	1115782	Church of St Bartholomew More images
Church of St George (United Reformed)	Thornton Hough, Wirral	Congregational Chapel	1906–07	2 December 1986	SJ3045480977; 53°19′16″N 3°02′44″W	1185603	Church of St George (United Reformed) More images
Church of St Peter	Heswall, Wirral	Church	14th century	15 November 1962	SJ2658381215; 53°19′22″N 3°06′13″W	1320306	Church of St Peter More images
Church of St Saviour	Oxton, Wirral	Parish Church	1889–92	28 March 1974	SJ3014887790; 53°22′56″N 3°03′06″W	1201591	Church of St Saviour More images
Church of St Barnabas	Bromborough, Wirral	Church	1862–64	27 December 1962	SJ3491282222; 53°19′58″N 2°58′44″W	1183871	Church of St Barnabas More images
Church of the Holy Cross	Woodchurch, Wirral	Parish Church	12th century	29 July 1950	SJ2757586844; 53°22′24″N 3°05′24″W	1217887	Church of the Holy Cross More images
Dovecote to north of Gayton Hall	Gayton, Wirral	Dovecote	1663	15 November 1962	SJ2733980455; 53°18′58″N 3°05′32″W	1075473	Upload Photo
Fort Perch Rock	New Brighton, Wirral	Fort	1826–29	4 January 1977	SJ3095294477; 53°26′33″N 3°02′28″W	1258164	Fort Perch Rock More images
Gatehouse to Thornton Manor and attached courtyard walls	Thornton Hough, Wirral	Gatehouse	1910	2 December 1986	SJ3008481662; 53°19′38″N 3°03′04″W	1343503	Gatehouse to Thornton Manor and attached courtyard walls More images
Gayton Hall	Gayton, Wirral	House	Late 17th century	15 November 1962	SJ2733180414; 53°18′56″N 3°05′32″W	1184100	Upload Photo
Grand entrance gateway to Birkenhead Park with north and south lodges	Birkenhead, Wirral	Gate	1847	29 July 1950	SJ3139089123; 53°23′40″N 3°02′00″W	1291891	Grand entrance gateway to Birkenhead Park with north and south lodges More images
Hill Bark	Frankby, Wirral	House	1929–31	5 June 1963	SJ2437385749; 53°21′47″N 3°08′16″W	1242748	Hill Bark More images
Hoylake and West Kirby War Memorial	Wirral	War Memorial	1919–22	24 March 2011	SJ2190087143; 53°22′31″N 3°10′31″W	1116883	Hoylake and West Kirby War Memorial More images
Leasowe Castle	Wirral	House	1593	20 May 1952	SJ2647191863; 53°25′06″N 3°06′28″W	1273527	Leasowe Castle More images
Market Cross at junction of Allport Lane	Bromborough, Wirral	Market Cross	1278 or Later	27 December 1962	SJ3498982136; 53°19′56″N 2°58′40″W	1075384	Market Cross at junction of Allport Lane More images
Memorial Chapel	Liscard, Wirral	Unitarian Chapel	1898–99	20 January 1988	SJ3091592150; 53°25′18″N 3°02′28″W	1273517	Memorial Chapel More images
Former Midland Bank	Birkenhead, Wirral	Bank (financial)	c. 1880	28 March 1974	SJ3250988812; 53°23′31″N 3°00′59″W	1282618	Former Midland Bank More images
No. 4 Dry Dock	Birkenhead, Wirral	Gate	c. 1857	13 January 1987	SJ3295088532; 53°23′22″N 3°00′35″W	1292032	No. 4 Dry Dock More images
Nos. 1 to 6 (consecutive), Mortimer St, with area railings attached	Birkenhead, Wirral	Terrace	c. 1825–30	28 March 1974	SJ3267188988; 53°23′36″N 3°00′50″W	1201559	Nos. 1 to 6 (consecutive), Mortimer St, with area railings attached More images
Perch Rock Lighthouse	New Brighton, Wirral	Lighthouse	1827–30	4 January 1977	SJ3086794677; 53°26′40″N 3°02′32″W	1258288	Perch Rock Lighthouse More images
Roman Catholic Church of English Martyrs	Wallasey, Wirral	Church	1952–53	30 July 2003	SJ2942992476; 53°25′28″N 3°03′48″W	1390589	Roman Catholic Church of English Martyrs More images
Storeton Hall	Storeton, Wirral	House	c. 1360	27 December 1962	SJ3052384417; 53°21′07″N 3°02′43″W	1075385	Storeton Hall More images
Thornton Manor	Thornton Hough, Wirral	Country House	Built c. 1840/50s	2 December 1986	SJ3004381704; 53°19′39″N 3°03′07″W	1075420	Thornton Manor More images
Thurstaston Hall	Thurstaston, Wirral	House	15th century or possibly earlier	15 November 1962	SJ2469084077; 53°20′54″N 3°07′58″W	1075371	Thurstaston Hall More images
Town Hall	Birkenhead, Wirral	Town Hall	1883	29 July 1950	SJ3264588963; 53°23′35″N 3°00′52″W	1201582	Town Hall More images

== See also ==
- Category:Grade II* listed buildings in Merseyside
