= Perch Rock =

Perch Rock may refer to:

- A rock outcrop in Liverpool Bay off the coast of New Brighton, Merseyside
- Fort Perch Rock, a 19th century fort on Perch Rock
- Perch Rock Lighthouse, a lighthouse on Perch Rock
