= Church of St Bridget, Liverpool =

Coordinates: 53.3966°N 2.9341°W

Church of Saint Bridget, Liverpool
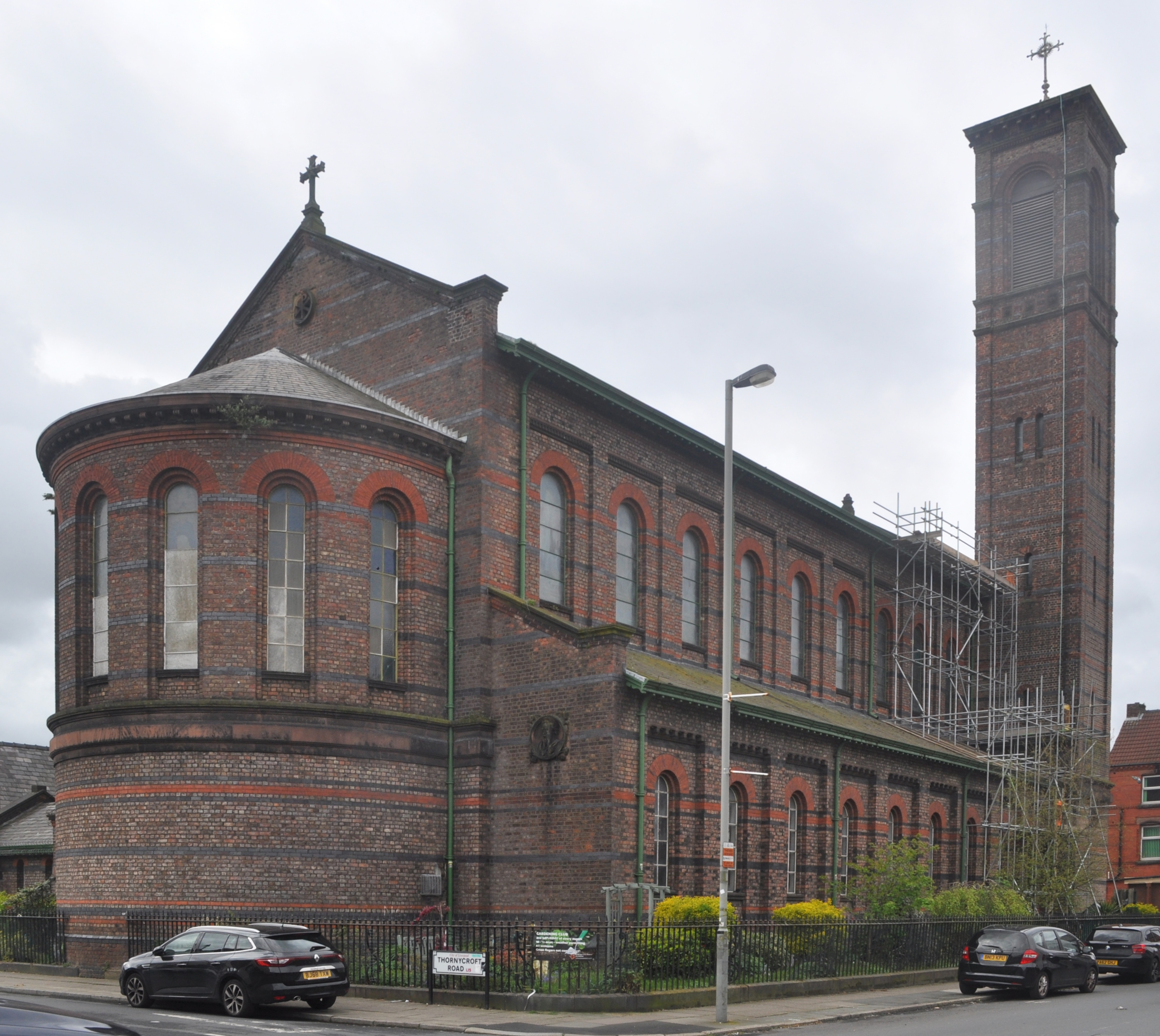
- St Bridget's Church in April 2024

- Location in Merseyside
- OS grid reference: SJ 379 892
- Location: Wavertree, Liverpool, Merseyside
- Country: England
- Denomination: Church of England
- Website: Saint Bridget, Liverpool

History
- Status: Parish church
- Consecrated: 1872

Architecture
- Functional status: Active
- Heritage designation: Grade II*
- Designated: 28 March 1952
- Architect: E. A. Heffer
- Architectural type: Church
- Style: Italianate
- Groundbreaking: 1868
- Completed: 1872

Specifications
- Materials: Brick with a slate roof

Administration
- Province: York
- Diocese: Liverpool
- Archdeaconry: Liverpool
- Deanery: Toxteth and Wavertree

The Church of Saint Bridget is in Bagot Street, Wavertree, Liverpool, Merseyside, England. It is recorded in the National Heritage List for England as a designated Grade II* listed building, and is an active Anglican parish church in the diocese of Liverpool, the archdeaconry of Liverpool and the deanery of Toxteth and Wavertree.

== History ==
The foundation stone was laid on 21 September 1868 and the church was consecrated in 1872. It was originally a chapel of ease to Holy Trinity Church, Wavertree, and became a parish in its own right in 1901. The architect was E. A. Heffer who designed the fabric of the church and its fittings.

== Architecture ==
=== Exterior ===
The church is built in the style of an Italianate basilica. It is constructed of common brick with banding of red and blue brick, and a slate roof. The plan consists of a nine-bay nave with a clerestory, lean-to aisles, a chancel with a round apse and a high thin northwest campanile with narrow lights. All the windows are round-headed. The top stage of the campanile has round-headed, louvred bell-openings and sill courses, a cornice and a pyramidal roof. The west front has an enclosed porch with a gabled round-headed entrance over which is a roundel with a bust of Christ. Above this are three windows surmounted by a roundel.

=== Interior ===
Inside the church are arcades of nine bays with round arches supported by scagliola columns. The capitals alternately have oak and acanthus decoration. The ceilings are richly ornamented and coffered. The altar is free-standing in the apse. The reredos is a mosaic depicting the Last Supper dating from 1866 by Salviati. The pulpit is large and rectangular, made of polychromatic stone and marble with a balustrade of Corinthian columns. The lectern stands on a simple marble column. The font is square and made of polychromatic marble with a mosaic medallion in each face. The stained glass in the clerestory windows is by Charles A. Gibbs and the glass in the First World War memorial is by H. Gustave Hiller.

== See also ==
- Grade II* listed buildings in Merseyside
