= Church of St Christopher, Norris Green =

Coordinates: 53.4399°N 2.9225°W

Church of St Christopher, Norris Green, Liverpool
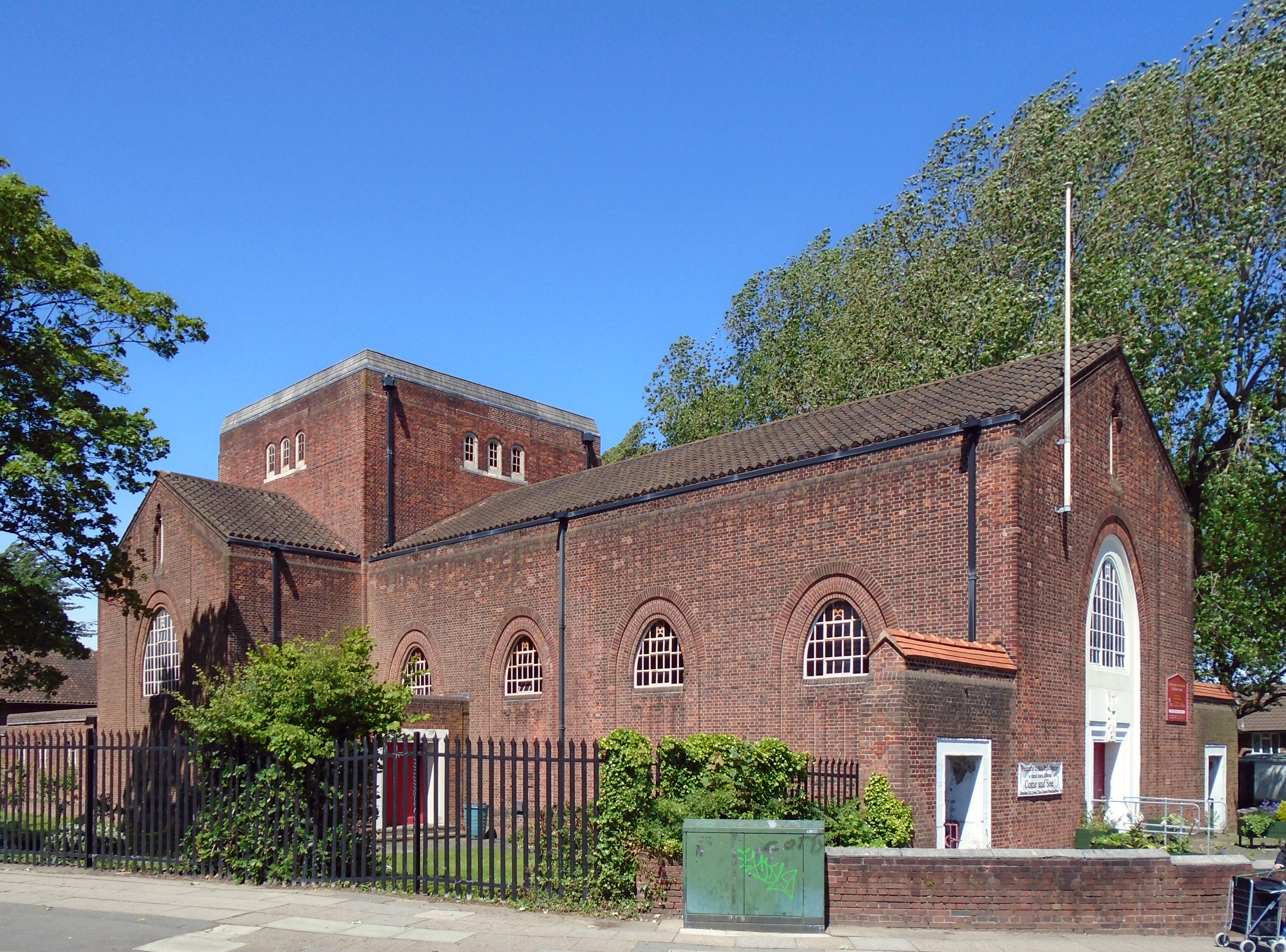
- View from Broad Lane

- Location in Merseyside
- OS grid reference: SJ 38659 94175
- Location: Lorenzo Drive, Norris Green, Liverpool, Merseyside
- Country: England
- Denomination: Anglican
- Website: St Christopher, Norris Green

History
- Status: Parish church

Architecture
- Functional status: Active
- Heritage designation: Grade II*
- Designated: 16 January 1981
- Architect: Bernard A. Miller
- Architectural type: Church
- Groundbreaking: 1930
- Completed: 1932
- Closed: 2025

Specifications
- Materials: Brick on steel frame, stone dressings, tiled roofs

Administration
- Province: York
- Diocese: Liverpool
- Archdeaconry: Liverpool
- Deanery: West Derby
- Parish: Saint Christopher, Norris Green

The Church of St Christopher is in Lorenzo Drive, Norris Green, Liverpool, Merseyside, England. It is recorded in the National Heritage List for England as a designated Grade II* listed building, and is a former Anglican parish church in the diocese of Liverpool, the archdeaconry of Liverpool, and the deanery of West Derby.

== History ==
The church was built in 1930–32, and designed by Bernard A. Miller. In 1964 the interior was repainted, replacing the original bright and varied colours with pale Wedgwood blue and cream. In 2025, due to declining attendance and issues with the building that were beyond the capacity of the congregation to repair, the church was closed for worship and its congregation merged into the new parish of Christ our Hope Liverpool.

== Architecture ==
St Christopher's is constructed in brick on a steel frame with stone dressings and has a tiled roof. It has a cruciform plan, consisting of a four-bay nave, north and south transepts, a tower at the crossing, and a two-bay chancel, with north and south chapels. (Note: The church is orientated north-south, making the ritual west the actual south. The directions given in the article are the ritual directions.) The west portal and the main windows in the church are hyperbolic in shape. (Note: Pollard and Pevsner comment that this was "quite an enterprising thing to do in 1930".) The tower is low and contains three segmental-headed windows, and the chapels have triple round-headed windows. Above the entrance to the south chapel is a bell-shaped bellcote.

There are more hyperbolic features inside the church, including the arches at the crossing, and in the vaulting. The chancel arch is decorated with a relief of a dove flanked by angels. The curved pulpit and lectern are integrated with the structures in the choir. The font has the plan of an eight-sided star, and its sides contain mirror glass.

== External features ==
To the east of the church are three-bay cloisters with round arches. In the east wall of the cloisters is on open-air pulpit, which contains sculpture by Bainbridge Copnall. Further to the east is a church hall, also in brick on a steel frame. On each of its long walls is a plaque with the image of an angel blowing pipes by H. Tyson Smith. Both the cloisters and the church hall are in Byzantine style.

== Appraisal ==
The church was designated as a Grade II* listed building on 16 January 1981. Both the description in the National Heritage List for England and Pollard and Pevsner in the Buildings of England series agree that it is Miller's most original church.

== See also ==
- Grade II* listed buildings in Merseyside
