= 159, 161 and 163 Crow Lane East =

Listed cottages in Merseyside, England

159, 161 and 163 Crown Lane East
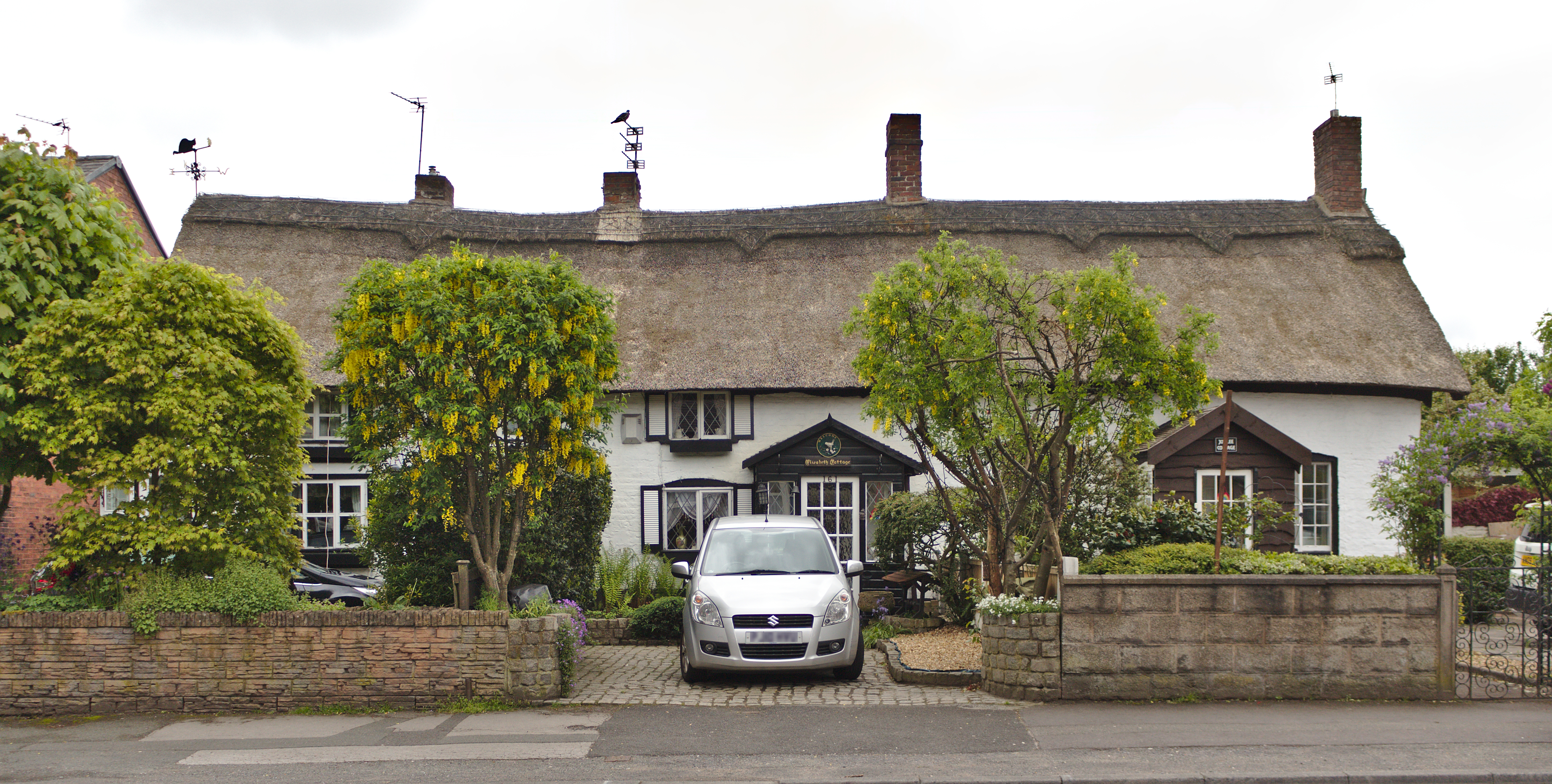
- The cottages in 2021

- Location within Merseyside

General information
- Type: Residential dwellings
- Location: Newton-le-Willows, Merseyside, England
- Coordinates: 53.456249°N 2.630963°W
- Completed: 16th century

Design and construction
- Designations

Listed Building – Grade II*
- Official name: 159, 161 and 163, Crow Lane East
- Designated: 3 February 1966
- Reference no.: 1343246

159, 161 and 163 Crown Lane East comprises a terrace of three cruck timber-frame thatched cottages in Newton-le-Willows, Merseyside, England. The 16th-century cottages are amongst the oldest continuously inhabited buildings in Newton and are protected by Grade II* listed status.

The cottages have become known locally for their elaborate Christmas displays and lights in aid of charitable causes.

== See also ==
- Grade II* listed buildings in Merseyside
- Listed buildings in St Helens, Merseyside
