= Statue of Queen Victoria, St Helens =

Public sculpture by George Frampton

Statue of Queen Victoria
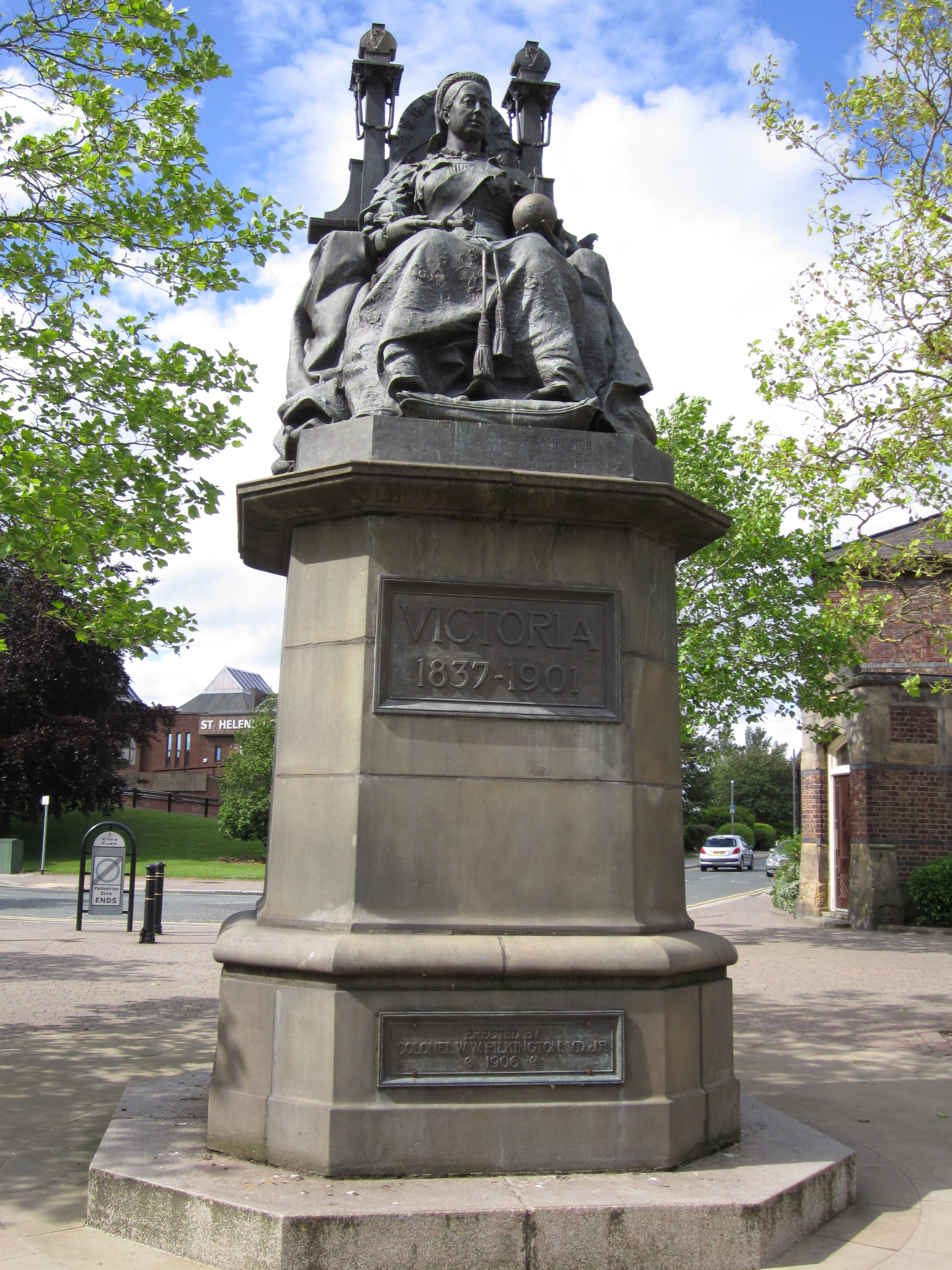
- Statue of Queen Victoria, St Helens

- Artist: George Frampton
- Year: 1902
- Medium: Bronze
- Movement: Arts and Crafts
- Subject: Queen Victoria
- Dimensions: 3.2 m (10 ft)
- Designation: Grade II* listed building
- Location: Victoria Square, St Helens
- 53.45418°N 2.73632°W

The Statue of Queen Victoria stands on the western side of Victoria Square, St Helens, Merseyside, England. It was created after the death of Queen Victoria and given to the town by Colonel William Windle Pilkington, mayor of St Helens in 1902, and a member of the Pilkington glass manufacturers in the town. Pilkington commissioned George Frampton to design it. Frampton used the same model for the figure of the queen for two other statues, but placed it on thrones and pedestals of different designs. The St Helens statue was unveiled by the Earl of Derby in 1905. Originally placed in the centre of Victoria Square, it was moved to a position on the west side of the square in 2000. The statue is recorded in the National Heritage List for England as a designated Grade II* listed building.

== History ==
Colonel William Windle Pilkington (1839–1914) was mayor of St Helens in 1902, the year of the Coronation of King Edward VII. Pilkington was the eldest son of Richard Pilkington, who had founded the Pilkington Brothers Glassworks in the town, and he was the technical director and chairman of the company. In order to celebrate his mayoralty, and to recognise the benefits the town had received during the life of Queen Victoria, who had died the previous year, Pilkington offered to give a statue of the queen to the town. He commissioned George Frampton to design it.

Frampton had previously been commissioned during the lifetime of the queen in 1898 by the Queen Empress Commemoration Fund to create a statue for Calcutta (now Kolkata) in India. This depicted Queen Victoria sitting on a throne, a concept inspired by the statue of the queen by Alfred Gilbert in 1887 for Winchester Castle. When Frampton's statue was unveiled in Calcutta by Lord Curzon, the Viceroy of India, he told Frampton that no future copies should be made of the statue. However, Frampton used the same idea, that of an enthroned queen, for Pilkington's commission, and he used the same model for casting statues in Leeds and Winnipeg, Manitoba, Canada, placing the statues on thrones and pedestals of differing designs.

The architects employed for the statue were Briggs and Wolstenholme of Liverpool, and it was built by W. Thornton and Son, also of Liverpool. The statue was unveiled on 15 April 1905 by the Earl of Derby. The statue was originally placed against the Gamble Institute (a technical institute), but in 1910, with the agreement of Colonel Pilkington and Frampton, it was turned through 90 degrees to face the Town Hall. In 2000, the statue was restored by the National Conservation Centre in Liverpool, and then replaced in a different position on the west side of Victoria Square.

== Description ==
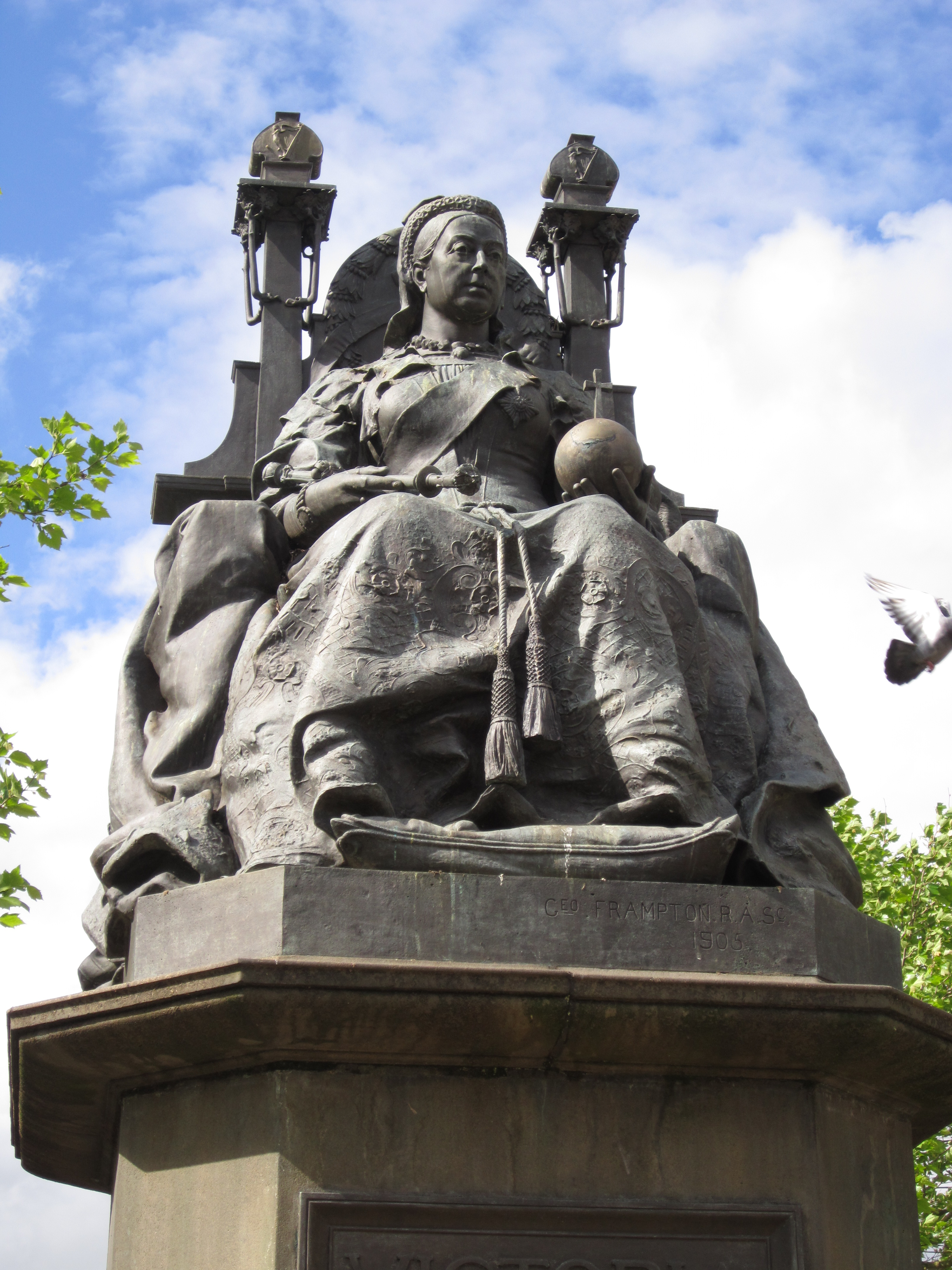
Figure of Queen Victoria

The statue consists of a figure in bronze on a base of granite and a pedestal of sandstone. The figure is about 3.2 metres (10.5 ft) high and the base and pedestal together are about 3.4 metres (11.2 ft) in height. Queen Victoria sits on a throne, with the sceptre resting on her right forearm, and holding an orb in her left hand. The orb is decorated with a rose, to represent Lancashire. (Note: At that time St Helens was in the historic county of Lancashire.) The queen is wearing a brocade dress with a sash, and a cloak. Her feet are resting on a cushion. The throne is in the Arts and Crafts style. Behind the queen's head is a laurel wreath, giving the appearance of a halo. Flanking the throne are two pillars, each surmounted by a capital in the form of attenuated oak trees. (Note: The attenuated oak tree capital is a feature specific to Frampton.) On top of the capitals are finials with carved harps on the fronts, to signify Ireland, and on the backs are lions rampart for Scotland. On the back of the throne is a statue of Saint George in armour, representing England. Supporting the statue is a base and a pedestal, both square with canted angles, on a hexagonal step. On the pedestal is a bronze plaque inscribed:

VICTORIA
1837–1901

and on the base is a plaque reading:

ERECTED BY
COLONEL W.W. PILKINGTON.
VD., J.P. 1906

== Appraisal ==
The memorial was designated as a Grade II* listed building on 12 December 1984. Grade II* is the middle of the three grades of listing designated by English Heritage, and is granted to particularly important buildings of more than special interest.

== See also ==
- Grade II* listed buildings in Merseyside
- Listed buildings in St Helens, Merseyside

== Notes and references ==
Notes

Citations

Sources

- Morris, Edward; Roberts, Emma (2012), Public Sculpture of Cheshire and Merseyside (excluding Liverpool), Public Sculpture of Britain, vol. 15, Liverpool: Liverpool University Press, ISBN 978-1-84631-492-6
- Historic England, "Statue of Queen Victoria in centre of Square, St Helens (1075878)", National Heritage List for England
- Historic England, Listed Buildings
- National Recording Project, Queen Victoria Monument, archived from the original on 19 February 2014
