= Church of St Vincent de Paul, Liverpool =

Listed building in Liverpool, England

Coordinates: 53.3969°N 2.9791°W

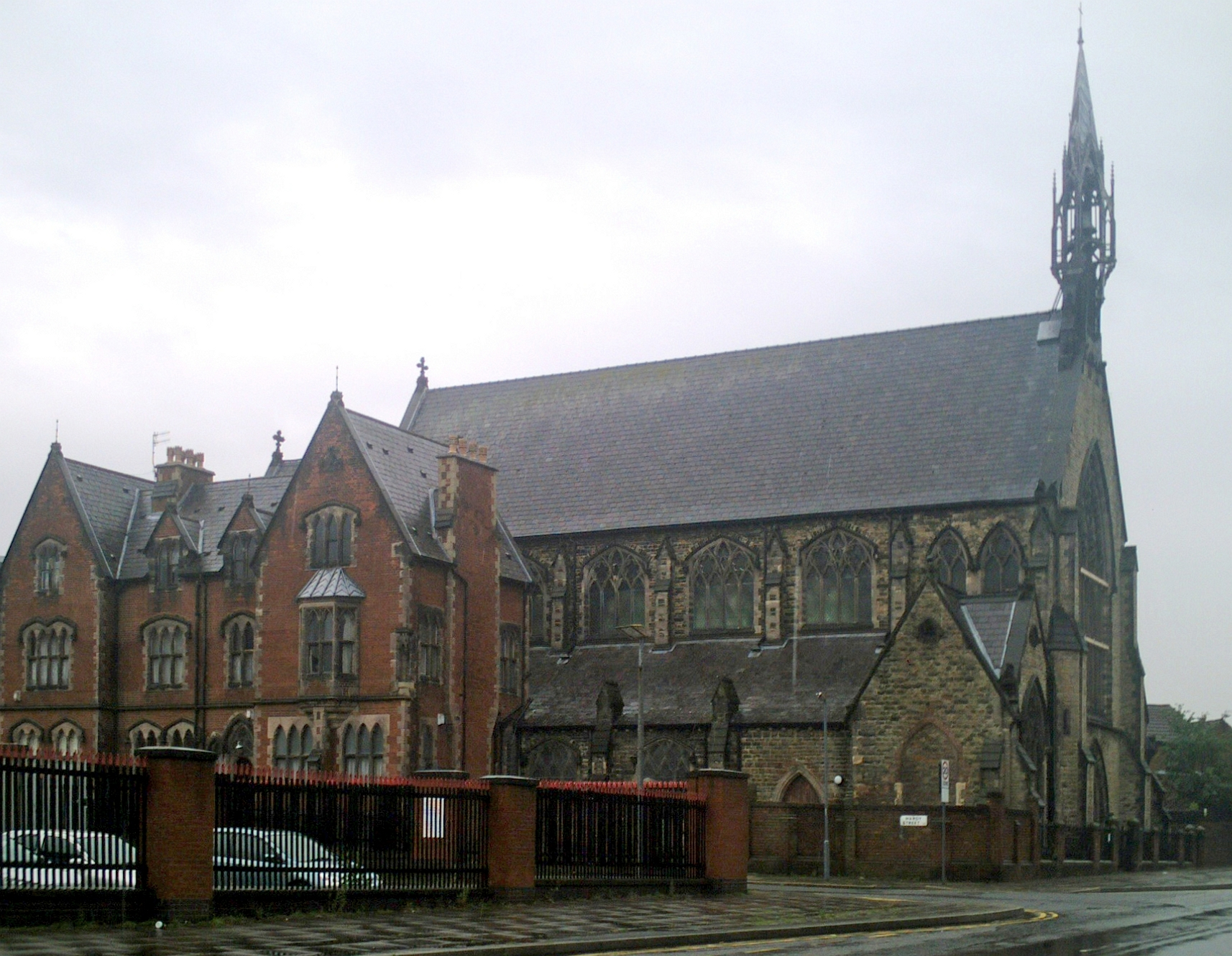
- Church of St Vincent de Paul, Liverpool, from the north

- Location in Central Liverpool
- OS grid reference: SJ 350 894
- Location: St James Street, Liverpool
- Country: England
- Denomination: Roman Catholic

History
- Status: Parish church
- Dedication: Saint Vincent de Paul

Architecture
- Functional status: Active
- Heritage designation: Grade II*
- Designated: 14 March 1975
- Architect: E. W. Pugin
- Architectural type: Church
- Style: Gothic Revival
- Groundbreaking: 1856
- Completed: 1857

Specifications
- Materials: Stone, slate

The Church of St Vincent de Paul is a Roman Catholic parish church on St James Street, Liverpool, England. It is an active parish church in the Archdiocese of Liverpool and the Pastoral Area of Liverpool South. The church is recorded in the National Heritage List for England as a designated Grade II* listed building.

== History ==
The church was designed by E. W. Pugin and built between 1856 and 1857. In 1927 a marble front was added to the high altar.

== Architecture ==
=== Exterior ===
Constructed in stone, in the style of the 13th century, the church has slate roofs. Its plan consists of a six-bay nave with a clerestory, north and south aisles, and a two-bay chancel with north and south chapels. On the west gable is a delicate open timber bellcote, which is described in the Pevsner Architectural Guide as the "most striking" external feature of the church. The west front has a pair of arched doorways under a larger arch containing a roundel. Above this is an eight-light window. The west front is flanked by large buttresses rising higher than the eaves. Along the sides of the clerestory are four-light windows. On the sides of the chancel are dormers, and the east window has nine lights.

=== Interior ===
Inside the church the five-bay arcades are carried on octagonal piers with capitals deeply carved with foliage. There are also arcades between the chancel and the chapels. The south aisle contains confessionals. There are marble altars in the chancel and the chapels, each with a reredos. The reredos in the chancel was designed by Pugin in 1867; it is in richly carved alabaster, and contains statues in niches. In each chapel are three statues in canopied niches. Stretching across the whole church is a continuous marble altar rail. The east window contains stained glass dating from 1925.

== External features ==
To the north of the church is the presbytery, built at about the same time as the church. It is constructed in brick and stone, and has a slate roof. It is in Gothic Revival style, with two storeys, gabled attics and tall chimneys. It is in four bays, and has an oriel window. The other windows are mullioned. The presbytery is listed at Grade II.

== See also ==
- Grade II* listed buildings in Liverpool – City Centre
- Grade II* listed buildings in Merseyside
