= St Benet's Chapel, Netherton =

Coordinates: 53.4946°N 2.9678°W

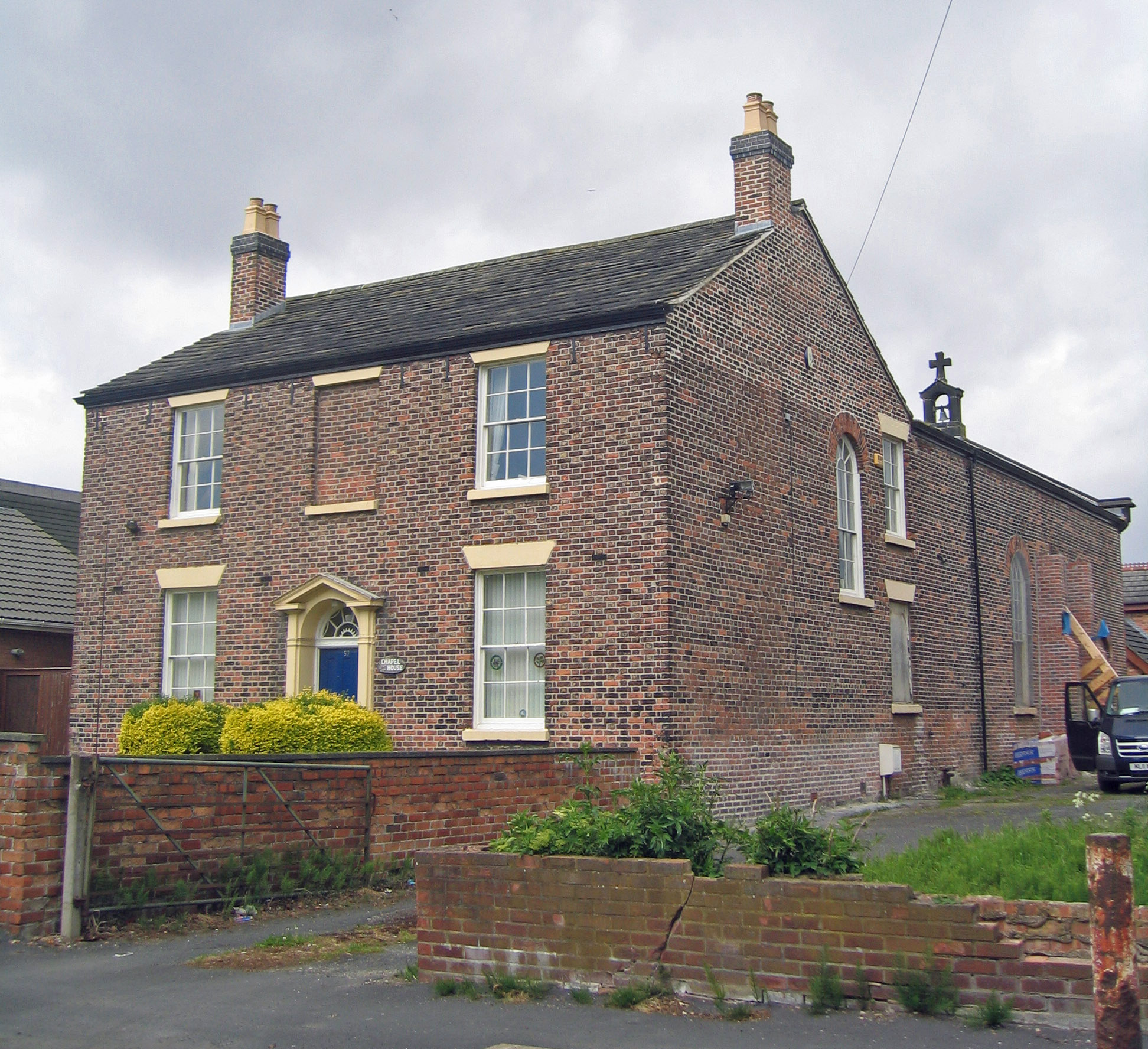
- Chapel House with the chapel extending behind

- Location in Merseyside
- OS grid reference: SD 358 002
- Location: Chapel Lane, Netherton, Merseyside
- Country: England
- Denomination: Roman Catholic
- Website: St Benet's Chapel

History
- Dedication: Saint Benet

Architecture
- Functional status: Redundant
- Heritage designation: Grade II*
- Designated: 11 October 1968
- Architectural type: Chapel
- Completed: 1793
- Closed: 1975

Specifications
- Materials: Brick with stone slate roof

St Benet's Chapel is a Roman Catholic church in Chapel Lane, Netherton, Bootle, Merseyside, England. The chapel and the attached priest's house are recorded in the National Heritage List for England as a designated Grade II* listed building. In the List it is described as "an important example of an early Catholic church and is one of the best preserved examples in the north-west". It was owned and substantially restored by the Historic Chapels Trust until removal of grants from Historic England to that trust when the lease was surrendered to the Archdiocese of Liverpool in 2026

== History ==
The chapel and associated presbytery were built in 1793, replacing a cottage and barn that had been used by Benedictine priests. It was built soon after the Catholic Relief Acts of 1778 and 1791 that allowed Roman Catholics to worship openly. Despite this, only the presbytery was visible from the road, with the chapel concealed behind it. The chapel was made redundant in 1975 and leased by the Historic Chapels Trust who restored the structure which was in very poor repair. The presbytery was restored in 2004 and is used as a residence for retired priests. The intention was to restore the chapel to present it as it was before the Second Vatican Council.

== Architecture ==
The presbytery faces the road and the chapel stretches at right angles from its rear. Both buildings are constructed in brick with stone dressings; the presbytery has a slate roof and the chapel has stone slate roof. The chapel is in two bays with round-headed sash windows. On its west gable is a bellcote surmounted by a cross. The entrance is at the west end of the north side and consists of paired doors over which is a blind tympanum. Internally, some of the fittings have been removed, and those remaining are considered to be important. At the west end is a gallery with a stick balustrade, and a dog-leg staircase on its north side. Around the chapel is a panelled dado and a cornice. The east wall is decorated with paired, fluted Corinthian pilasters carrying an entablature with urns, a frieze with anthemions, and an open pediment. Curtains hang from the pediment, which are open to display a descending dove, a Gloria and cherubs' heads with wings. The altar is marbled and dates probably from the 1830s.

The presbytery appears from the road to be a "standard two-bay house". It has two storeys. Over all the windows are wedge lintels. The two windows in the ground floor of the entrance front are sashes with glazing bars; the two windows above them are casements. Between the windows on the ground floor is a doorway containing a six-panel door with flat pilasters and an open pediment, over which is a fanlight. Between the windows on the upper floor is a blind window. On the right (north) side are two windows, one on each floor, and a round-headed stair window at an intermediate level. On each side of the presbytery is a gable surmounted by a chimney stack.

== See also ==
- Grade II* listed buildings in Merseyside
- List of chapels preserved by the Historic Chapels Trust
