= Hoylake and West Kirby War Memorial =

WW1 & WW2 war memorial in Wirral, England

- United Kingdom
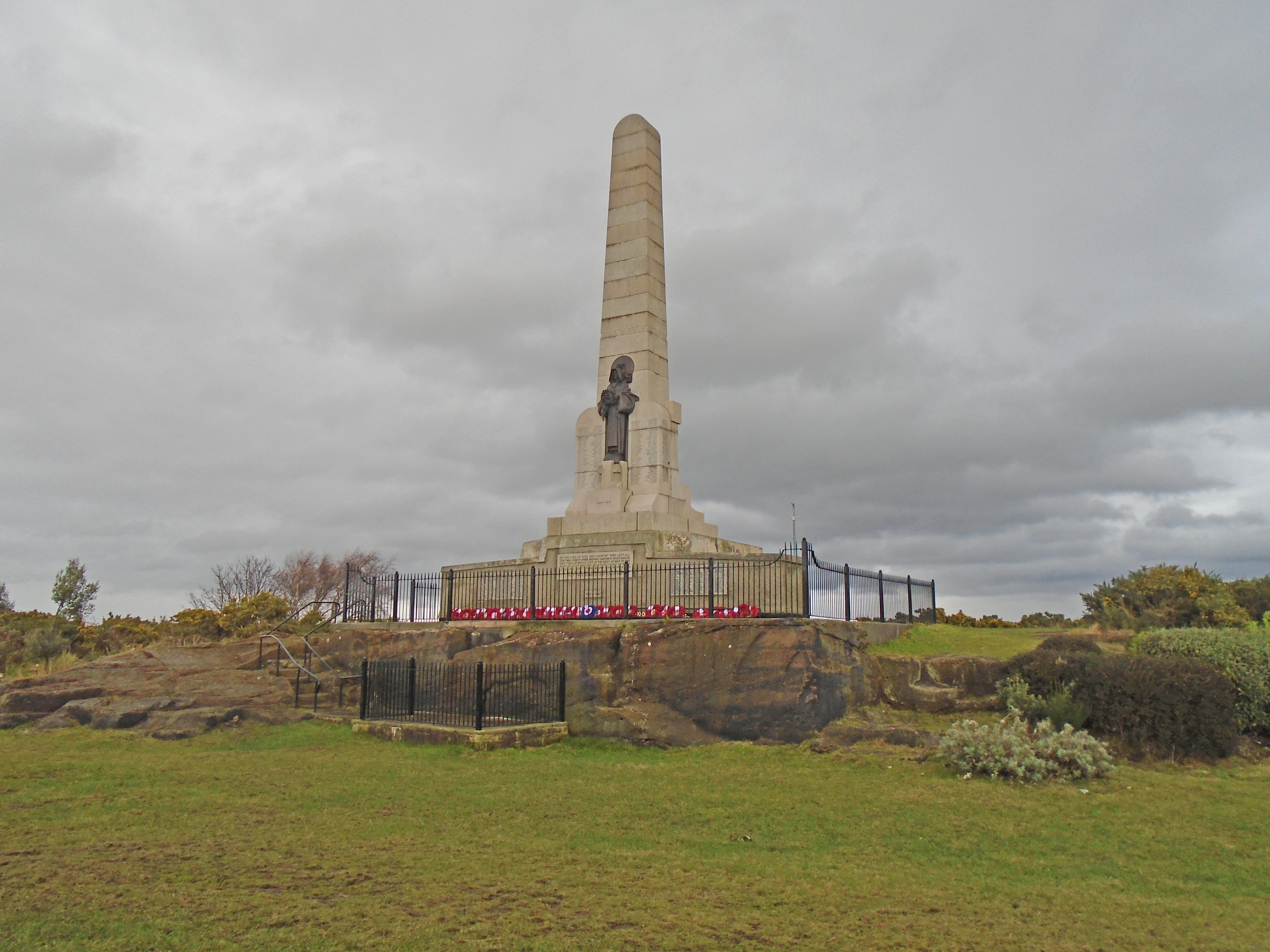
- The war memorial on Grange Hill, West Kirby
- For the men and women of West Kirby and Hoylake who died in World Wars I and II
- Unveiled: 16 December 1922
- Location: 53.375327°N 3.175392°W near West Kirby, Merseyside
- Designed by: Charles Sargeant Jagger

Listed Building – Grade II*
- Official name: Hoylake and West Kirby War Memorial
- Designated: 24 March 2011
- Reference no.: 1116883

The Hoylake and West Kirby War Memorial is a 14.5-metre (48 ft) tall, granite four-sided obelisk which stands on Grange Hill, West Kirby, Merseyside, in North West England. It was designed by British sculptor Charles Sargeant Jagger (1885–1934), who also designed the Royal Artillery Memorial at Hyde Park Corner in London. It commemorates the men and women of West Kirby and Hoylake who gave their lives in World Wars I and II.

It is the site of a yearly remembrance Sunday ceremony featuring a parade, wreath-laying, and a service to those who died in the First World War.

== Description ==
On two sides of the obelisk stand bronze figures symbolising war and peace. On the west face is a figure of a robed woman holding a baby, a wreath of poppies and broken manacles. On the east face stands a British infantry soldier dressed for winter and standing guard with standard issue .303 rifle, bayonet fixed, a gas mask, water bottle, putties and his helmet pushed off the back of his head, and a German helmet at his feet .

Inscriptions around the base read:

AT THE CALL OF KING AND COUNTRY THEY LEFT ALL THAT WAS DEAR TO THEM, ENDURED HARDNESS, FACED DANGER AND FINALLY PASSED OUT OF THE SIGHT OF MEN BY THE PATH OF DUTY AND SELF SACRIFICE, GIVING UP THEIR OWN LIVES THAT OTHERS MIGHT LIVE IN FREEDOM. LET THOSE WHO COME AFTER SEE TO IT/THAT THEIR NAMES BE NOT FORGOTTEN.

— West face

IN GRATITUDE TO GOD AND TO THE MEN AND WOMEN FROM THESE PARTS WHO LAID DOWN THEIR LIVES IN THE GREAT WAR 1914–1919 – 1939–1945. THEY WERE A WALL UNTO US BOTH BY NIGHT AND DAY.

— East face

The memorial was unveiled on 16 December 1922 by the Earl of Birkenhead with 5,000 people in attendance. The memorial is in the care of Metropolitan Borough of Wirral.

The memorial was extensively restored between 2012 and 2026 by Wirral Council and a volunteer group called Friends of Grange Hill, having previously fallen into a state of disrepair. New lighting was installed as part of the renovation work.

A recasting of the soldier figure now forms part of the "Drivers and Wipers" Memorial at the Shrine of Remembrance in Melbourne, Australia.

Sculptures and inscriptions

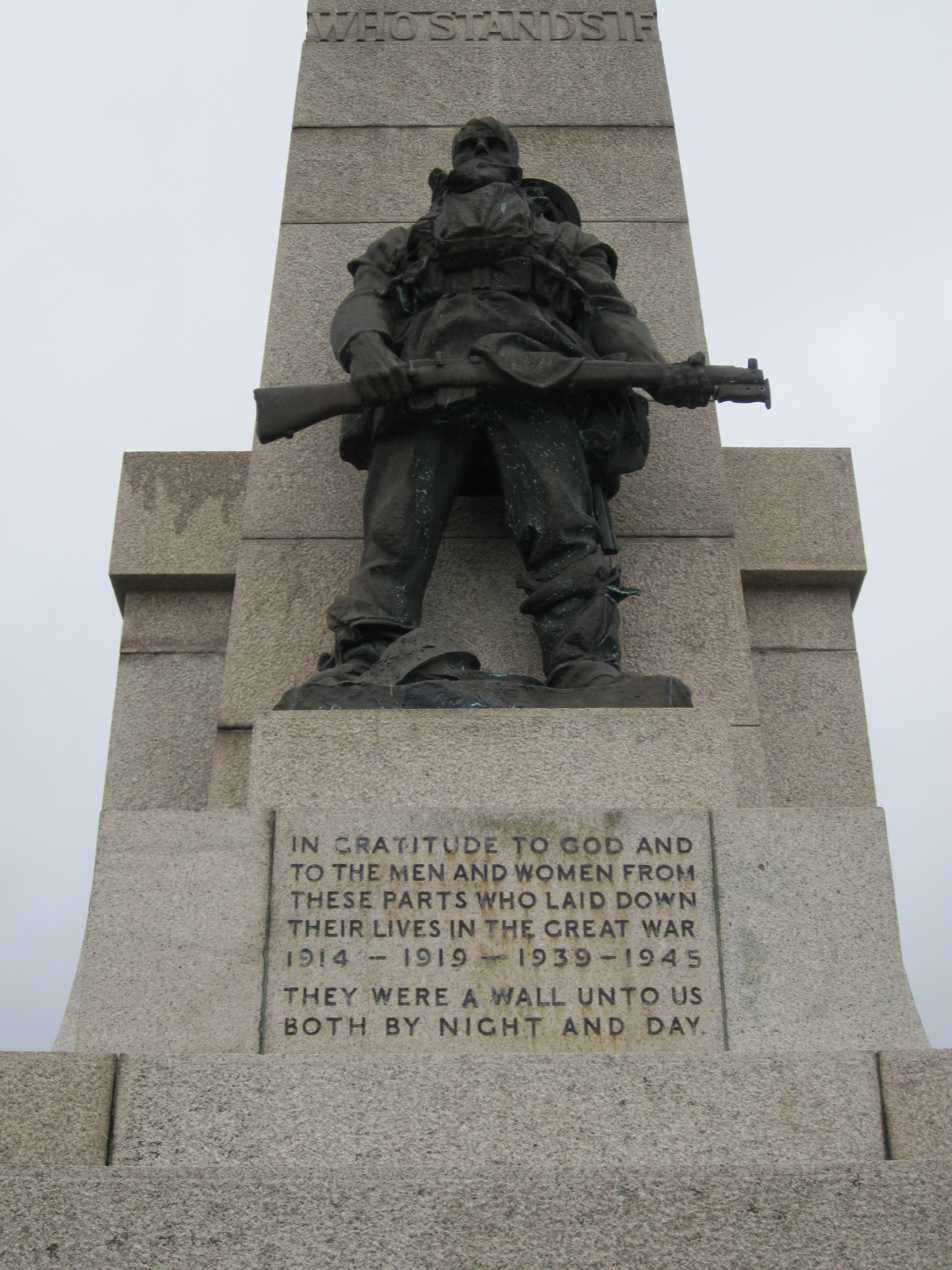
Jagger's British infantry soldier

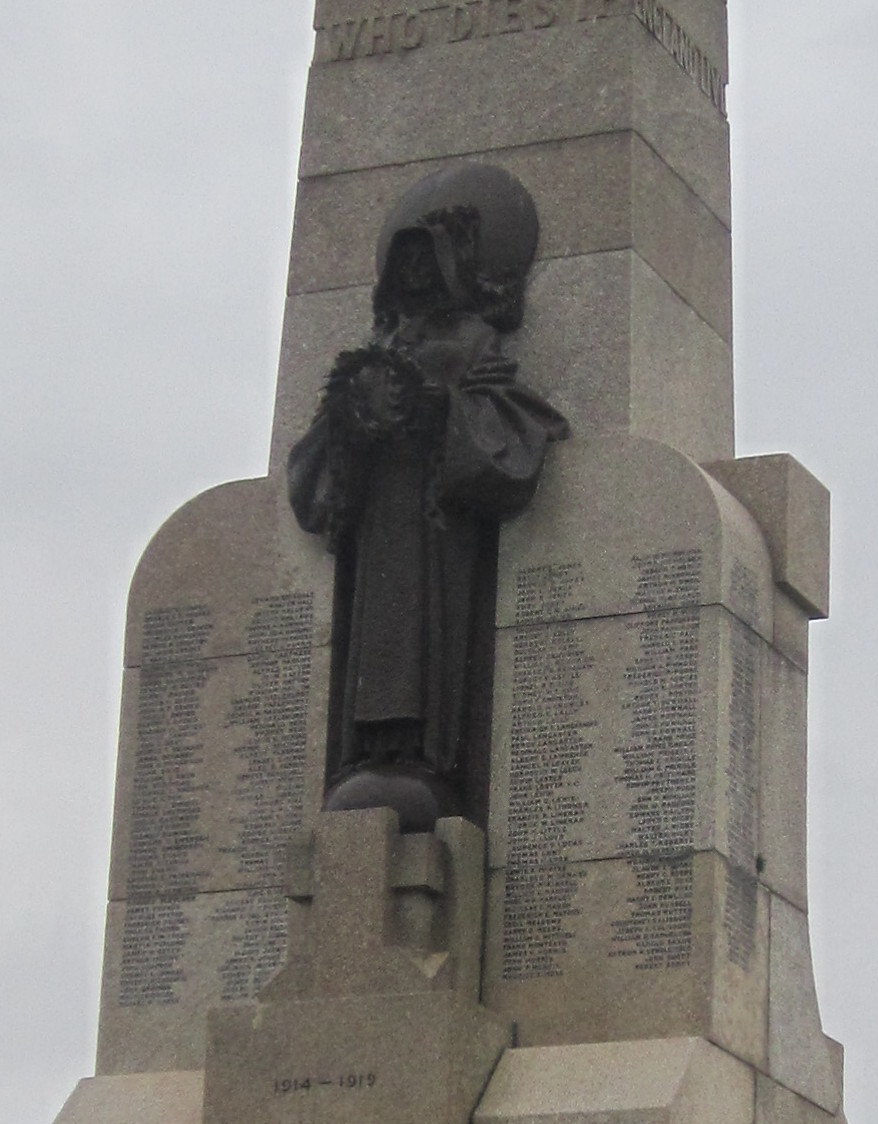
Jagger's woman holding a baby and a wreath

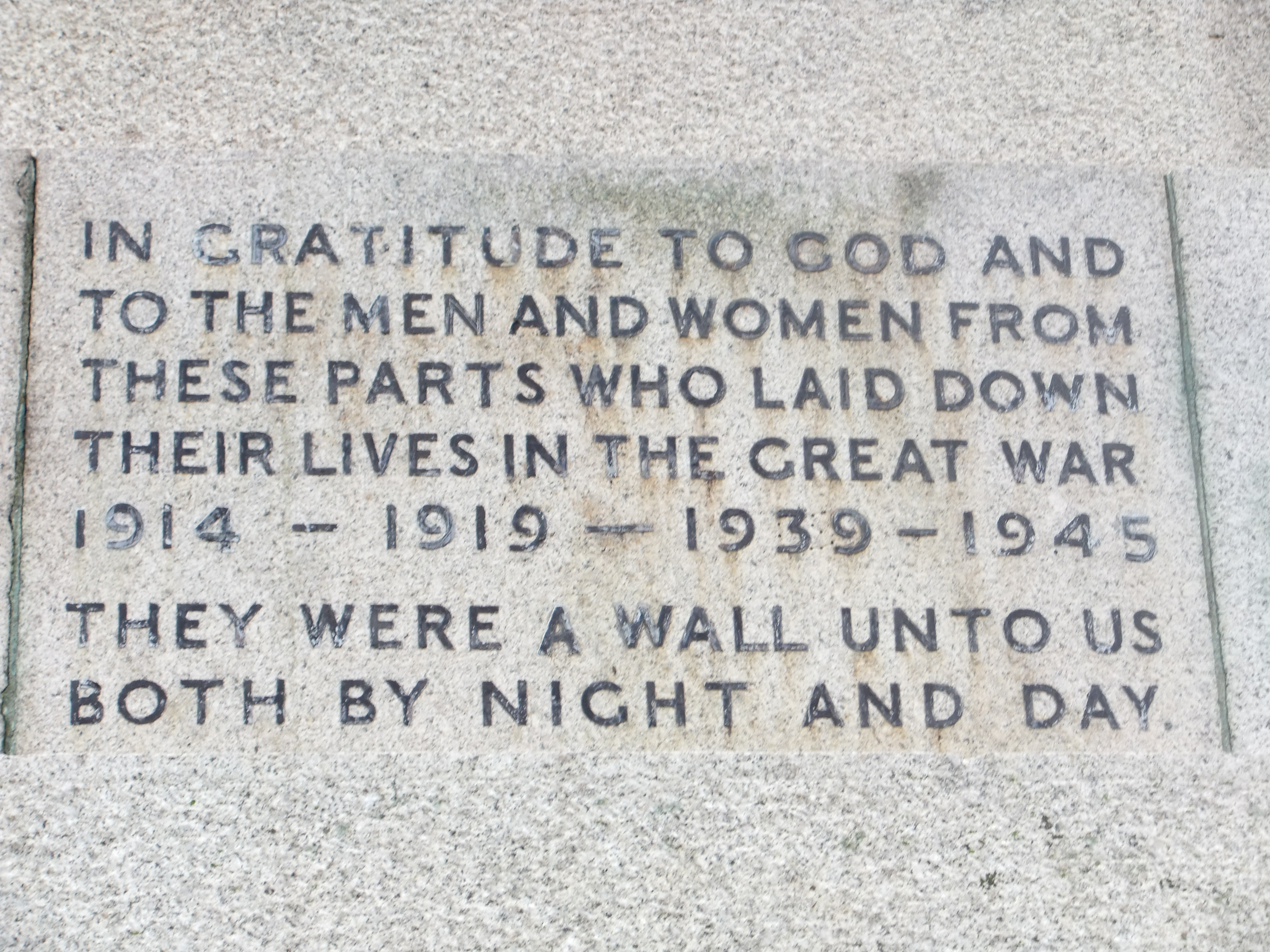
East face inscription

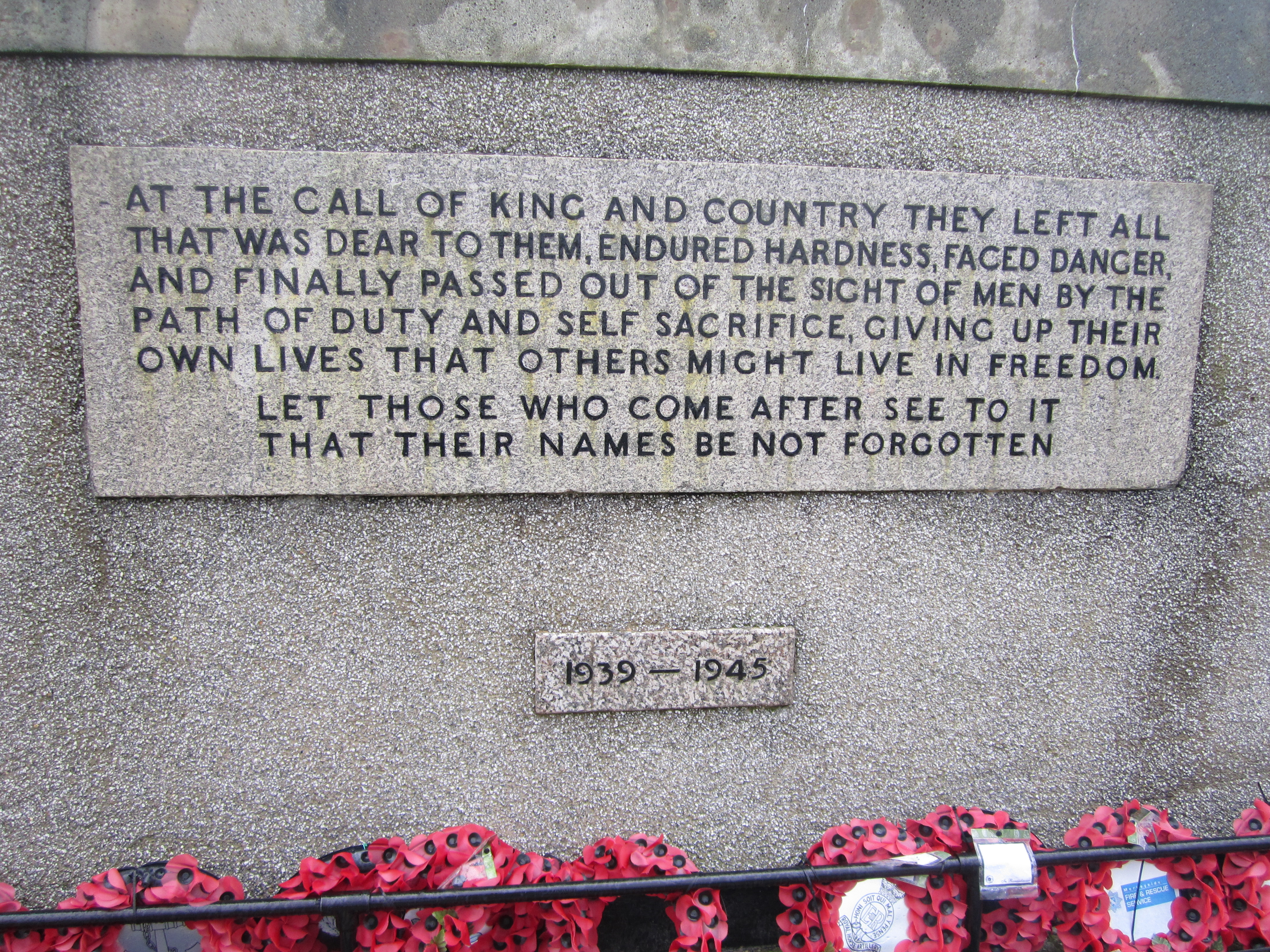
West face inscription

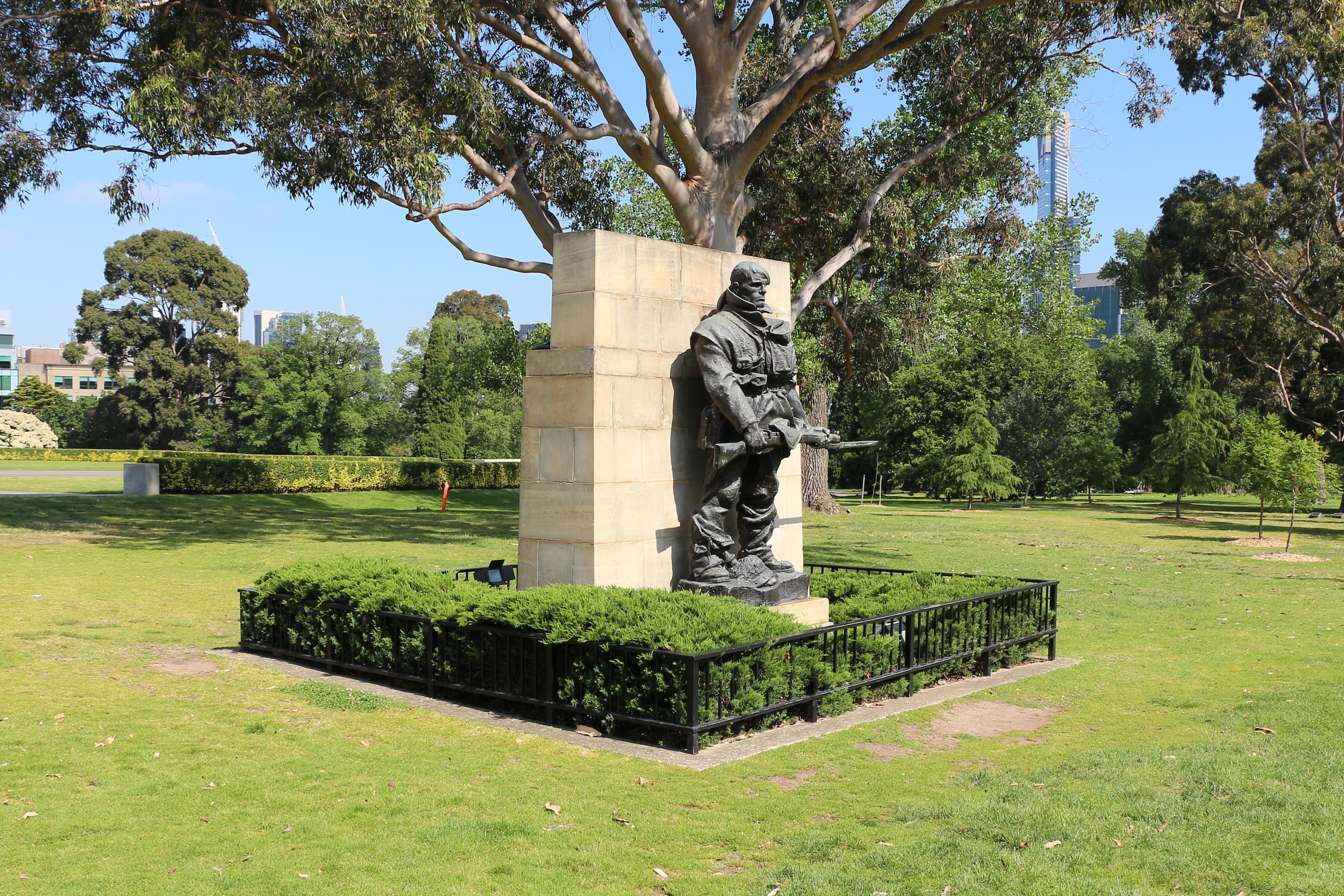
Jagger's "Drivers and Wipers" Memorial in Melbourne, Australia

== See also ==
- Grade II* listed buildings in Merseyside
- Grade II* listed war memorials in England
- Listed buildings in Hoylake
