= Church of St Clement, Liverpool =

Coordinates: 53.3970°N 2.9525°W

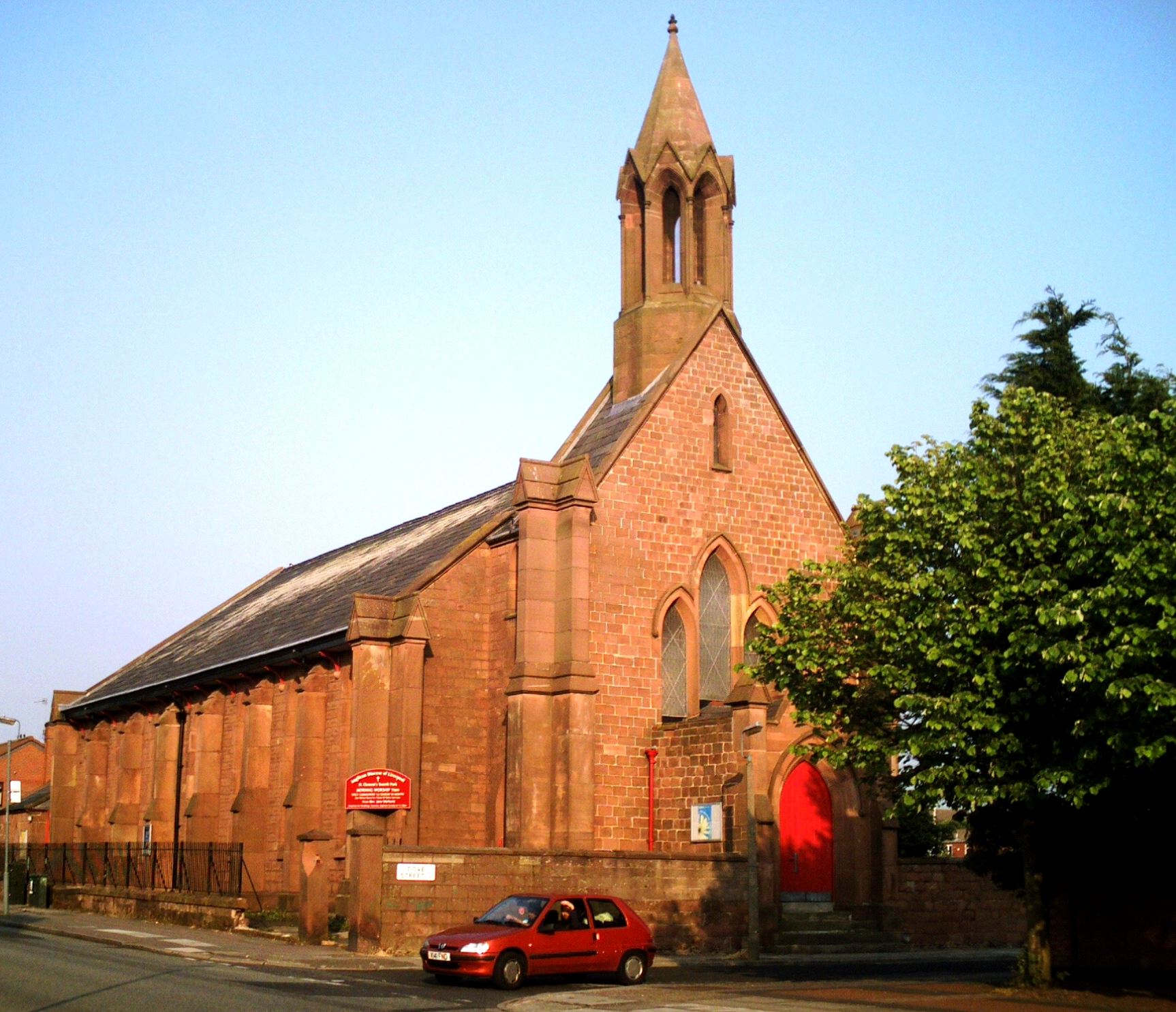
- Church of St Clement, Liverpool, from the northwest

- Location in Merseyside
- OS grid reference: SJ 368 893
- Location: Beaumont Street, Toxteth, Liverpool
- Country: England
- Denomination: Anglican
- Churchmanship: Open Evangelical
- Website: St Clement, Liverpool

History
- Status: Parish church

Architecture
- Functional status: Active
- Heritage designation: Grade II*
- Designated: 14 March 1975
- Architect(s): Arthur and George Yates Williams
- Architectural type: Church
- Style: Gothic Revival
- Groundbreaking: 1840
- Completed: 1841

Specifications
- Materials: Stone, slate roof

Administration
- Province: York
- Diocese: Liverpool
- Archdeaconry: Liverpool
- Deanery: Toxteth and Wavertree

Clergy
- Vicar: Rev. Elaine Jones

The Church of St Clement is in Beaumont Street, Toxteth, Liverpool, England. It is an active Anglican parish church in the diocese of Liverpool, the archdeaconry of Liverpool, and the deanery of Toxteth and Wavertree. The church is recorded in the National Heritage List for England as a designated Grade II* listed building.

== History ==
The church was built in 1840–41 to a design by Arthur and George Yates Williams. A west porch was added later, and in 1892 the original straight flight of stairs leading up to the pulpit was replaced by a separate spiral staircase. In 1984 a screen was placed under the west gallery to provide a parish room.

== Architecture ==
=== Exterior ===
St Clement's Church is constructed in stone with a slate roof. Its plan consists of a seven-bay nave and a chancel with a shallow canted apse at the east end. Along the sides of the church are lancet windows between buttresses; at the corners the buttresses are gabled. At the west end of the church is a further projecting bay, narrower than the rest of the church, and with a steeper roof. This contains north and south doors, and the stairs leading up to the gallery. The west face contains three stepped lancet windows. On the summit is an octagonal bell turret with gabled openings, surmounted by a short spire with a finial. Projecting from this bay is a porch with a pointed entrance and gabled buttresses. At the east end of the church the apse has a hipped roof and a triple lancet window.

=== Interior ===
Inside the church there are galleries on three sides, with the organ at the west end. The galleries are carried on cast iron columns. A screen has been inserted under the west gallery to provide a separate enclosed area. At the east end the altar is placed in a shallow polygonal recess. Flanking the communion table are boards inscribed with the Ten Commandments. The chancel arch is plain, and bears an inscription. The pulpit is a two-decker with an integral reading desk. Its upper deck is carried on four iron columns, and is reached by a spiral staircase. The pews are box pews, some of which have been removed around the pulpit. The ceiling is a plaster vault painted with stars. Pollard and Pevsner in the Buildings of England series say of the interior: "This is a rare survival of an all but complete pre-Ecclesiological Victorian church".

== See also ==
- Grade II* listed buildings in Merseyside
