= Manor Court House, West Derby =

Listed building in Liverpool, England

Manor Court House
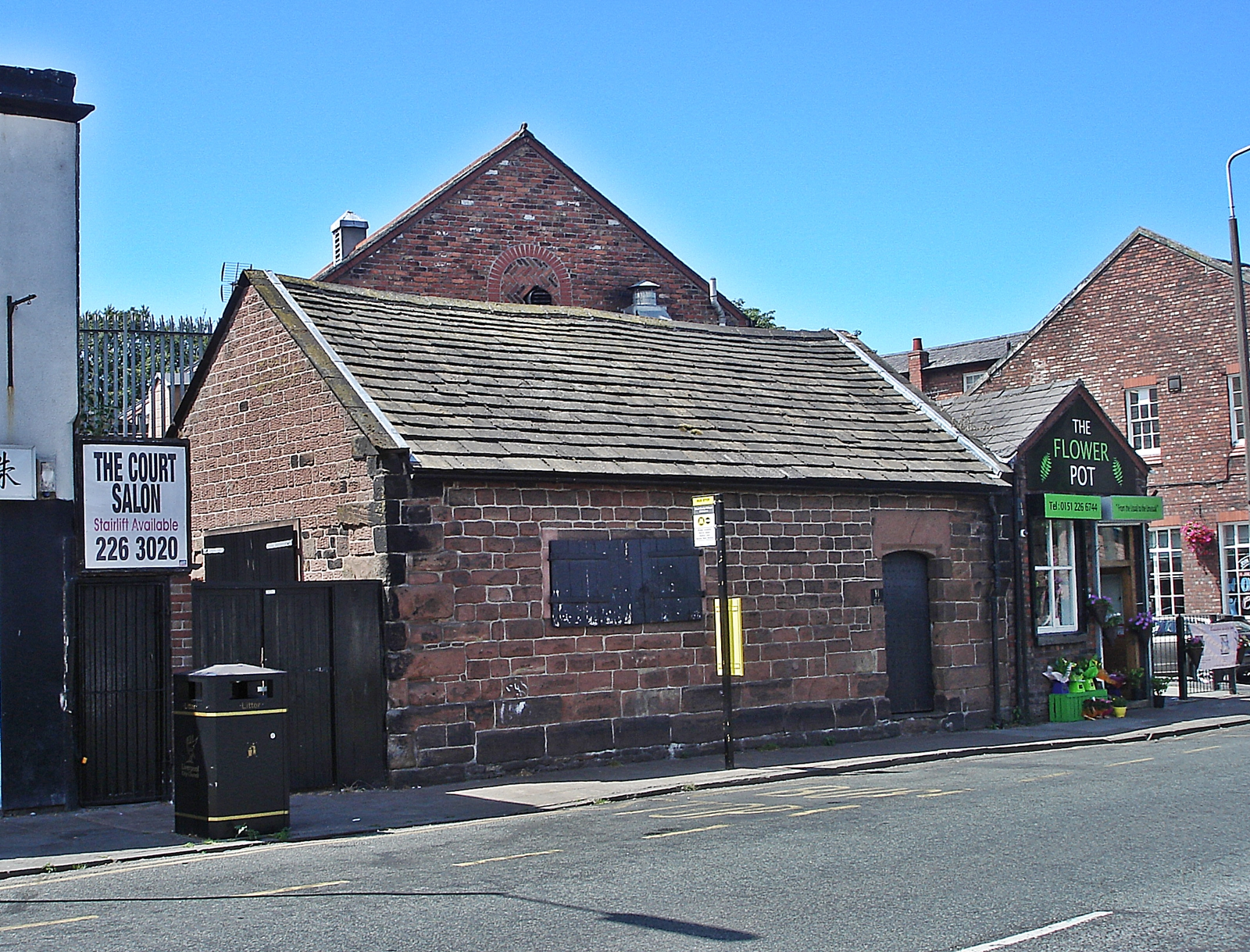
- The Old Courthouse

General information
- Address: West Derby, Liverpool, England
- Coordinates: 53°25′59″N 2°54′36″W
- Year(s) built: 1662
- Designations

Listed Building – Grade II*
- Official name: The Old Court House
- Designated: 28 June 1952
- Reference no.: 1068420

Manor Court House is a historic building in West Derby, Liverpool, England. The present building is the result of a rebuilding in 1662 of the courthouse previously rebuilt in 1586 by Queen Elizabeth I. There has been a courthouse in West Derby for over 1,000 years since the Wapentake court of the Vikings.

It is constructed of sandstone as a single storey building with a stone tiled roof, and has one window and a studded door. The interior has the Steward's bench and jury benches surrounding a table. The Steward was traditionally a member of the Molyneux family of nearby Croxteth Hall. The court dealt with minor offences such as drunkenness, vagrancy or failing to control animals and could only issue fines; failure to pay the fine could lead to time in the adjacent stocks, now relocated across the road.

It is jointly maintained by Liverpool City Council and the West Derby Society and open to the public on Sunday afternoons between April and October. It is a Grade II* listed building.

== See also ==
- Grade II* listed buildings in Liverpool – Suburbs
