= New Brighton Lighthouse =

Decommissioned lighthouse in Wirral, Merseyside, England

New Brighton Lighthouse Perch Rock
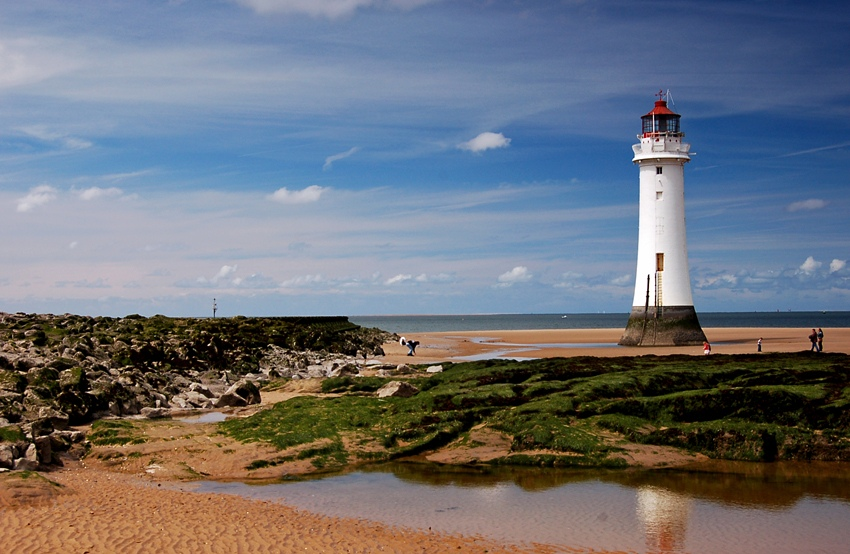
- New Brighton Lighthouse and Perch Rock
- Location: Liverpool Bay; New Brighton, Merseyside; England
- OS grid: SJ3086794677
- Coordinates: 53.444334°N 3.042309°W

Tower
- Constructed: 1683 (first)
- Construction: Granite tower
- Height: 28.5 metres (94 ft)
- Shape: Tapered cylindrical tower with balcony and lantern
- Markings: White tower and red lantern
- Operator: Private owner
- Heritage: Grade II* listed building

Light
- First lit: 1830 (current)
- Deactivated: 1973–2016
- Focal height: 23 m (75 ft)
- Characteristic: Fl W(2) R(1)

New Brighton Lighthouse (also known as Perch Rock Lighthouse and called Black Rock Lighthouse in the 19th century) is a decommissioned lighthouse situated at the confluence of the River Mersey and Liverpool Bay on an outcrop off New Brighton known locally as Perch Rock. Together with its neighbour, the Napoleonic era Fort Perch Rock, it is one of the Wirral's best known landmarks.

== History ==
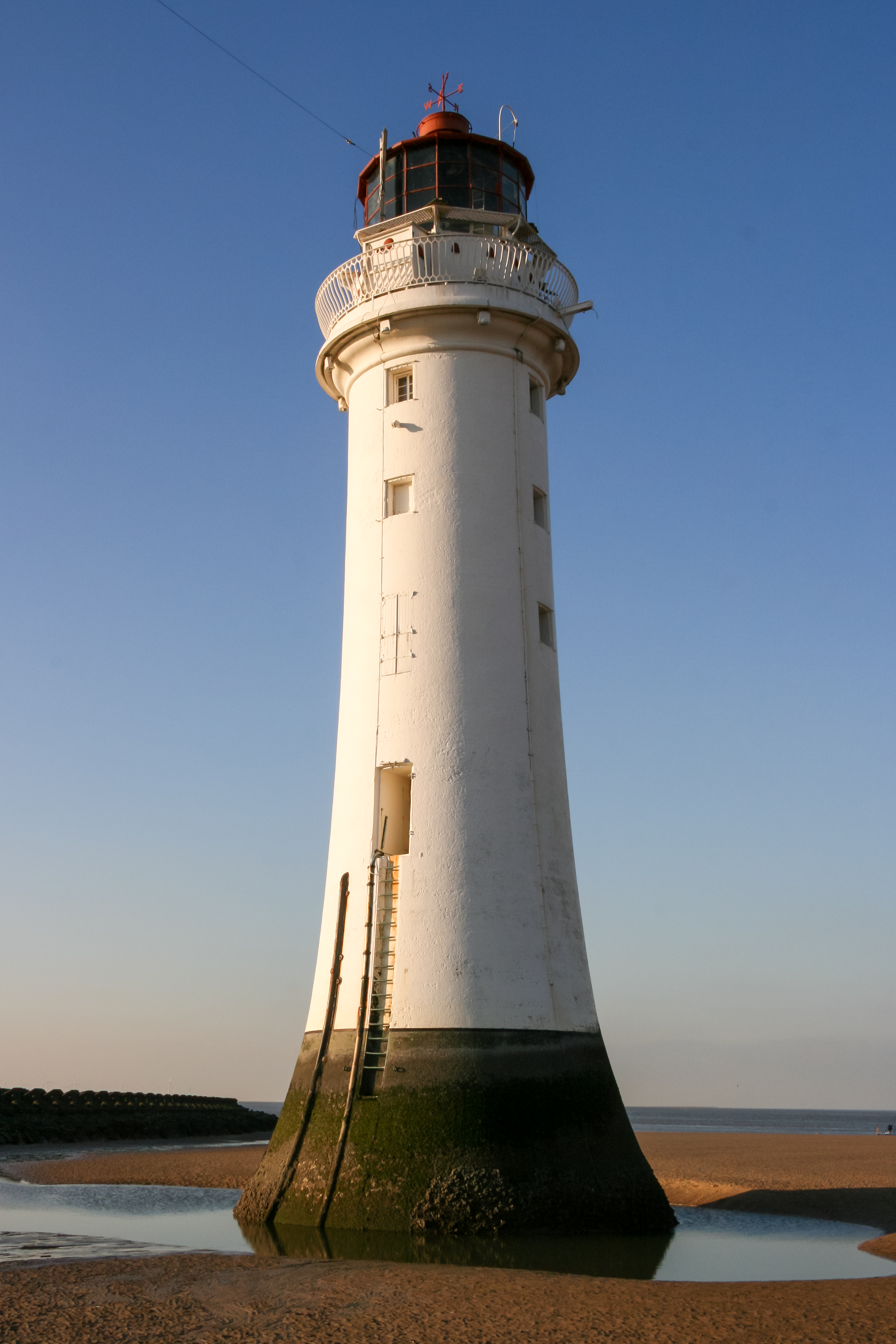
New Brighton Lighthouse

The name comes from a Perch; a timber tripod supporting a lantern first erected in 1683 as a crude beacon to allow shipping to pass the rock safely. As the Port of Liverpool developed in the 19th century the perch was deemed inadequate as it required constant maintenance and only produced a limited light. Designed by John Foster Jr, construction of the present tower began in 1827 by Tomkinson & Company using blocks of interlocking Anglesey granite using dovetail joints and marble dowels. It was designed to use many of the same construction techniques used in the building of John Smeaton's Eddystone Lighthouse 70 years earlier. Modelled on the trunk of an oak tree, it is a free standing white painted tower with a red iron lantern. It is 29 m (95 ft) tall. It was first lit in 1830 and displayed two white flashes followed by a red flash every minute; the light-source was thirty Argand lamps, mounted on a three-sided revolving array (ten lamps on each side, with red glass mounted in front of one side). There were also three bells mounted under the gallery to serve as a fog signal; they were tolled by the same clockwork mechanism that caused the lamps to revolve.

The lighthouse was in continuous use until it was decommissioned in October 1973, having been superseded by modern navigational technology. Although the lighting apparatus and fog bell have been removed, the lighthouse is very well preserved and retains many features lost on other disused lighthouses. It was restored and repainted in 2001 when an LED lightsource was installed which flashed the names of those lost at sea; including all the 1,517 victims of the sinking of the Titanic. At low tide, it is possible to walk to the base of the tower, but a 25-foot (7.6 m) ladder is needed to reach the doorway. The lighthouse is owned and maintained by the Perch Rock Lighthouse Charity, and is a Grade II* listed building.

Another plan to illuminate the lantern using LEDs and solar panels was achieved with a grant from the Coastal Revival and New Brighton Coastal Community Team (NBCCT) and has been operating (albeit only to be seen from land) since 2015. The new light replicates the old characteristic of two white flashes followed by a red flash.

== See also ==
- List of lighthouses in England
- Grade II* listed buildings in Merseyside
