= Norris Green =

Suburb of Liverpool, England

Coordinates: 53.435°N 2.929°W

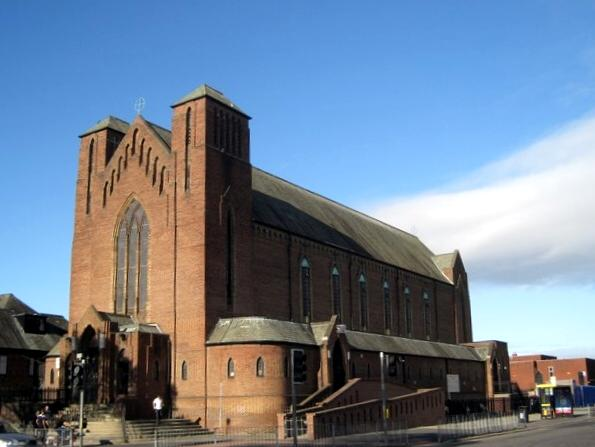
- St Teresa's Church, Norris Green

- Location within Merseyside
- Population: 15,047 (2011 Census)
- OS grid reference: SJ383954
- Metropolitan borough: Liverpool
- Metropolitan county: Merseyside
- Region: North West
- Country: England
- Sovereign state: United Kingdom
- Post town: LIVERPOOL
- Postcode district: L11
- Dialling code: 0151
- Police: Merseyside
- Fire: Merseyside
- Ambulance: North West
- UK Parliament: Liverpool West Derby

Norris Green is a suburb and ward of Liverpool, England, in the east of the city. At the 2001 Census it had a population of 17,784, which had fallen to 15,047 at the 2011 Census.

== History ==
Historically a part of Lancashire, Norris Green's development was announced in late 1925 and named after the Liverpool-based Norris family.

It is thought the land Norris Green was built on was donated to the city by Lord Derby, who was at the time resident at nearby Knowsley Hall. It is also suggested Lord Derby did not give the land away - he didn't own it in the first place.

The area called Norris Green was a farming estate; it stretched as far as Stone Bridge House to the north and Norris Green Farm (opposite the junction of Hornspit Lane and Almonds Green) to the south. The sale boundary in the 1920s consisted of the railway, Carr Lane, Dwerryhouse Lane and Hornspit Lane. It was bought by the council for the sum of £65,000 from the estate of Leyland & Naylor.

== Geography ==
The area is defined by a number of major thoroughfares. These are: the A580 East Lancashire Road and a small portion of Walton Hall Avenue to the north; Lowerhouse Lane and Dwerryhouse Lane to the east; Muirhead Avenue and Queens Drive to the south and Townsend Avenue back to Walton Hall Avenue to the west.

The area is bordered by Walton to the west, Fazakerley to the north, Croxteth to the north east and east, West Derby to the south and Clubmoor to the south-west

Norris Green's district centre is known locally as "Broadway", consisting of mainly shops found around Broadway and Broad Lane (though this is actually located in neighbouring Clubmoor ward). The former North Liverpool Extension Line runs past this area and includes Broadway Bridge.

There are no actual pubs in the main residential area, but a small number of public houses do exist particularly around the vicinity of Broadway shops.

== Housing ==
Homes on the periphery of the estate and on the main routes through the area are largely brick and well-built, with those on minor routes and residential roads made of concrete. It is this concrete group of housing that was considered defective.

The estate was subject to large-scale upgrading and renovation in the early 1970s, when it was still almost entirely under local authority ownership. This was several years before the introduction of the right to buy scheme, which gave council tenants the right to buy their homes from local authorities.

A large number of new homes have been constructed on derelict land cleared following the demolition of defective houses on the "Boot Estate". Most of these demolitions took place around 2000.

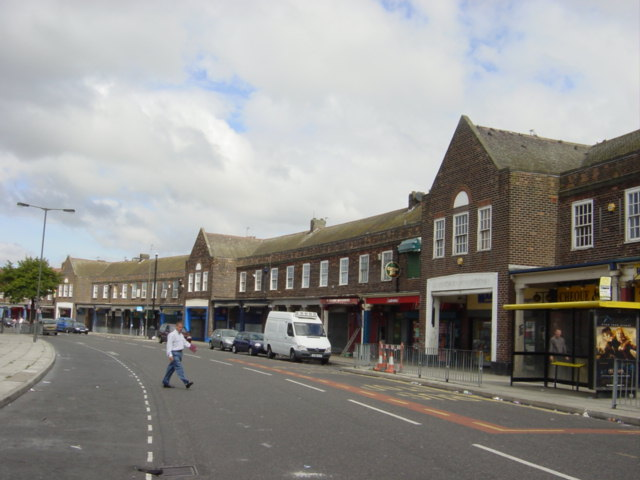
Broadway, Norris Green

== Landmarks ==
The most notable landmark when approaching Norris Green from the north or west is the large former Cheshire Lines railway bridge, on the former Loop Line, crossing the junction of Utting Avenue and Townsend Avenue from north to south. A 1930s art deco public library is also widely recognised. The exterior and interior of Norris Green Youth Centre have been refurbished; this 2011 refurbishment, supported by the annual charity event Children in Need, was featured on BBC Television's DIY SOS.

== Transport ==
There are a number of frequent bus services to and from Liverpool city centre via Norris Green and the Broadway area. The No.14 (will accept both Arriva or Stagecoach bus tickets or passes) bus is the main bus route running from the city centre to Willow Way, Croxteth. A major cross city bus route, the 61 Aigburth to Seaforth bus service also passes through the area. A project to provide a tram service, Merseytram, was abandoned due to a lack of funds.

== Notable people ==
- Peter Byrne (philosopher)
- Steve Coppell, former Manchester United football player and former manager of Reading, was born here.
- Shaun Duggan, writer, was born and grew up in the area.
- Howard Gayle, footballer
- Geoffrey Hughes, who found fame in Coronation Street, and later Heartbeat and Keeping Up Appearances grew up in Norris Green.
- Holly Johnson and other members of Frankie Goes to Hollywood.
- Chris Lawler, footballer for Liverpool FC
- Ian McCulloch, lead singer of the prominent Liverpool band Echo & the Bunnymen grew up on Parthenon Drive in Norris Green. Also, a track from their 2006 album Siberia is titled Parthenon Drive.
- Winifred Robinson, the BBC Radio presenter, lived here for twenty years from 1962.
- Joe Royle, former Everton player and Manchester City manager, was also from the area.
- 1980s pop band A Flock of Seagulls originated from Norris Green.
- Mark "Bez" Berry's parents grew up in the area.
- Actor Tom Baker grew up in this area.
- Chris Wilder, Sheffield United football club manager, lived in the area.
- Molly McCann, UFC fighter, grew up in Norris Green.
- George Hannah (1928-1990), footballer who played as a forward for Newcastle United F.C., Lincoln City F.C., Manchester City F.C, Notts County F.C., and Bradford City A.F.C.

== See also ==
- Church of St Christopher, Norris Green
