= Orleans House, Liverpool =

Listed building in Liverpool, England

Orleans House
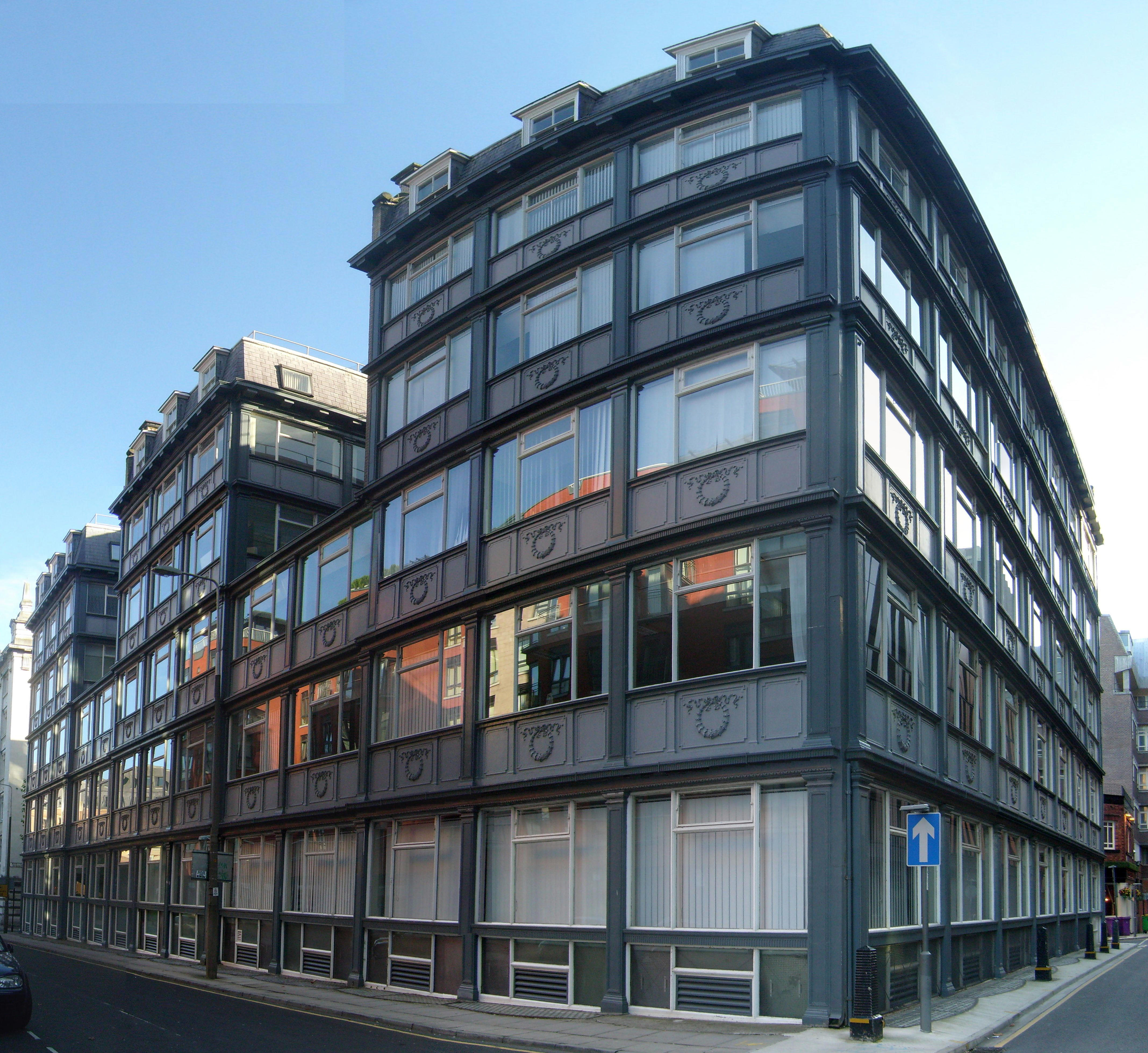

General information
- Address: Edmund Street, Liverpool, England
- Coordinates: 53°24′35″N 2°59′32″W
- Year(s) built: 1907

Design and construction
- Architect(s): Matear and Simon
- Designations

Listed Building – Grade II*
- Official name: Orleans House
- Designated: 14 March 1975
- Reference no.: 1206657

Orleans House is a 20th-century Grade II* listed building located on Edmund Street in Liverpool, England. Originally constructed as a warehouse for the nearby Liverpool Cotton Exchange Building, the building later became offices and more recently has been redeveloped into apartments.

== History ==
Built in 1907 by architecture firm Matear and Simon as a warehouse for the Liverpool Cotton Exchange Building located next door, the building was designed to follow a similar architectural style. In 2016 the building was purchased for £9.6 million by property firm Delph and was converted into 71 residential apartments.

== See also ==
- Grade II* listed buildings in Liverpool – City Centre

== Bibliography ==
- Pollard, Richard (2006). Lancashire: Liverpool and the Southwest. New Haven and London: Yale University Press. ISBN 9 780300-10910-8.
