= Tue Brook House =

Listed building in Liverpool, England

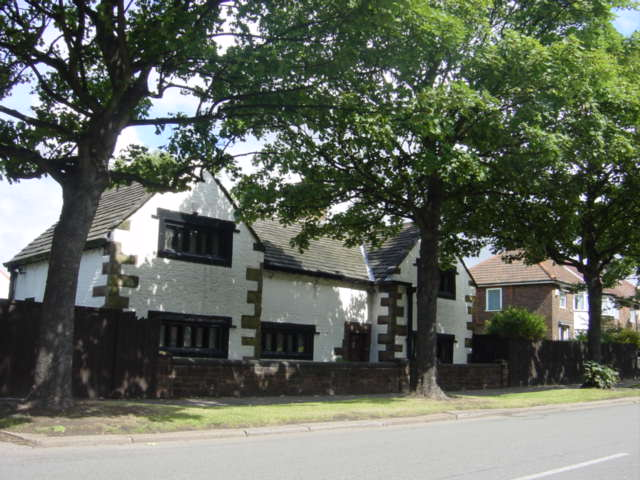

General information
- Address: 695 West Derby Road, Liverpool, England
- Coordinates: 53°25′35″N 2°55′35″W
- Year(s) built: 1615
- Designations

Listed Building – Grade II*
- Official name: Tue Brook House
- Designated: 28 June 1952
- Reference no.: 1360223

Tue Brook House on 695 West Derby Road in Liverpool, England was built in 1615 as a farmhouse. It is now owned by a local family. It is thought to have been originally owned by John Mercer, a yeoman farmer and during the Victorian period was the home and workshop of a Mr. Fletcher, a wheelwright. Some parts of the building contain sections of its original "wattle and daub" construction, which can be seen through glass panels. It also contains a priest hide located in the chimney breast between two of the bedrooms.

It was Grade II* listed in 1952.

== See also ==
- Grade II* listed buildings in Liverpool – Suburbs
