= St Patrick's Church, Liverpool =

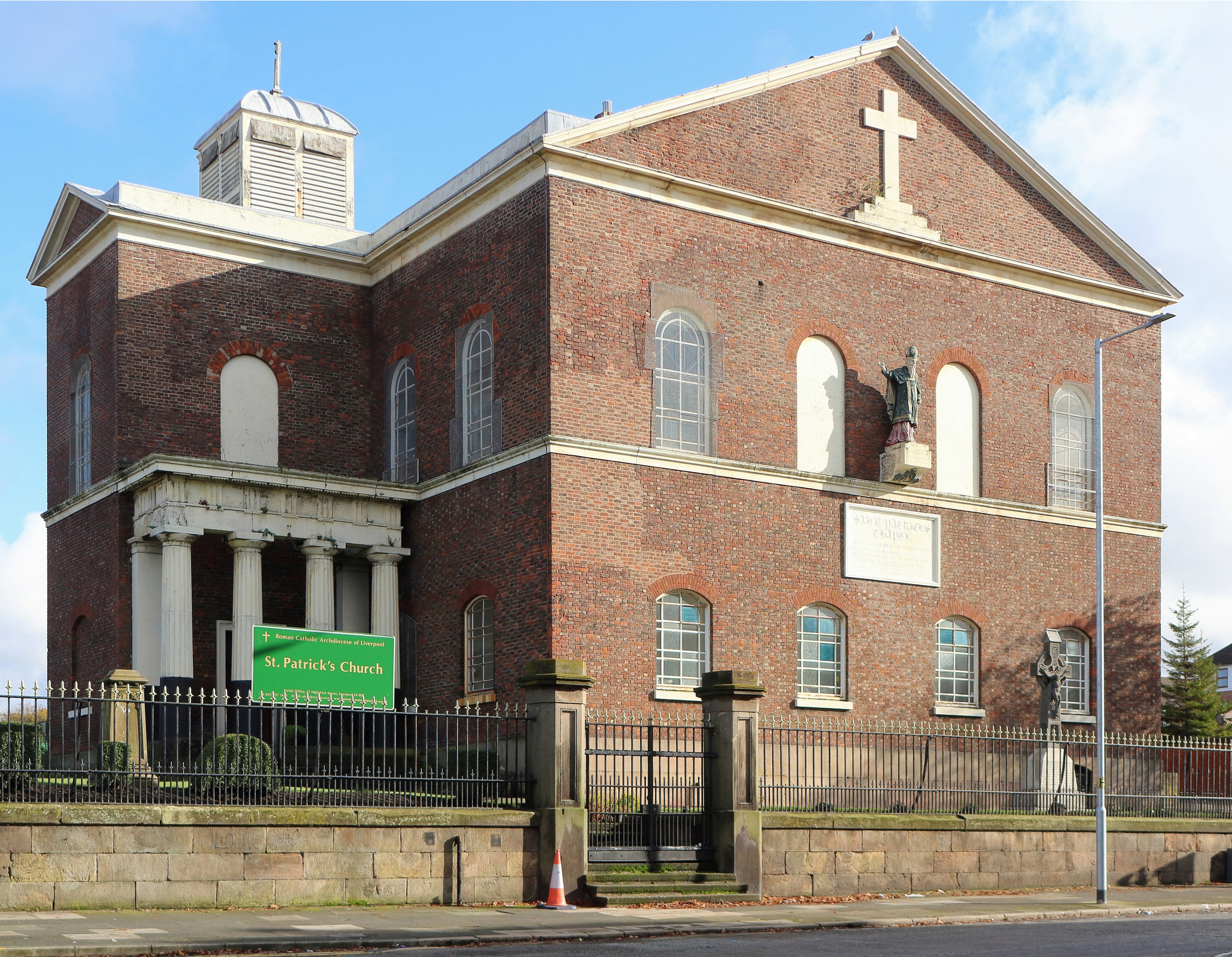
- St Patrick's Church, Liverpool, from the northwest

- Location in Liverpool
- 53.3921°N 2.9716°W
- OS grid reference: SJ 35478 88806
- Location: Park Place, Liverpool, Merseyside
- Country: England
- Denomination: Roman Catholic

History
- Status: Parish church
- Dedication: Saint Patrick

Architecture
- Functional status: Active
- Heritage designation: Grade II*
- Designated: 14 March 1975
- Architect: John Slater
- Architectural type: Church
- Style: Neoclassical
- Groundbreaking: 1821
- Completed: 1827

Specifications
- Materials: Brick with stone dressings, slate roof

Administration
- Diocese: Liverpool

Clergy
- Priest: Revd John Southworth

St Patrick's Church is a Roman Catholic parish church in Park Place, Liverpool, Merseyside, England. It is an active parish church in the Archdiocese of Liverpool and the Pastoral Area of Liverpool South. The church is recorded in the National Heritage List for England as a designated Grade II* listed building.

== History ==
St Patrick's was built between 1821 and 1827, and designed by John Slater. A baldachino was erected inside the church in 1953.

== Architecture ==
=== Exterior ===
The church is constructed in brick on a stone base, with stone dressings and slate roofs. It is in Neoclassical style, with two tiers of round-headed casement windows. The plan is rectangular, with a short two-storey transept on each side, and a low block at the east end containing vestries. A square louvred belfry stands on the roof of the north transept. A stone band runs round the church between the storeys, and around the top is a frieze and a cornice. The west end is in four bays. Above the windows in the lower storey is a plaque. The central two windows in the upper storey are blind, and between them is the free-standing statue of Saint Patrick on a plinth. The statue was moved from the St Patrick Insurance Company building in Dublin in 1827, when it was presented to the church by James Branker, a sugar refiner. At the top of the west front is a pedimented gable, which contains a Calvary cross. On the west sides of each transept is a porch fronted by four Greek Doric columns.

=== Interior ===
Inside the church are galleries on three sides, supported by cast iron columns. The area under the west gallery has been partitioned to form a separate area. The plaster ceiling is segmental and panelled. At the centre is a roundel carved with foliage, and surrounded by a Greek key border. At the east end is a baldachino surrounded by large Corinthian columns and an elaborate entablature. On the east wall above the altar is a large painting of the Crucifixion executed in about 1834 by Nicaise de Keyser of Antwerp. On each side of the baldachino are niches containing statues of Saint Matthew and Saint Mark. The three-manual pipe organ is in the west gallery. It was built by Bishop in 1827, rebuilt in 1927 by Rushworth and Dreaper, and rebuilt and extended in 1953, again by Rushworth and Dreaper.

== See also ==
- Grade II* listed buildings in Liverpool – Suburbs
