= Village Cross, West Derby =

High cross in Liverpool, England

Village Cross
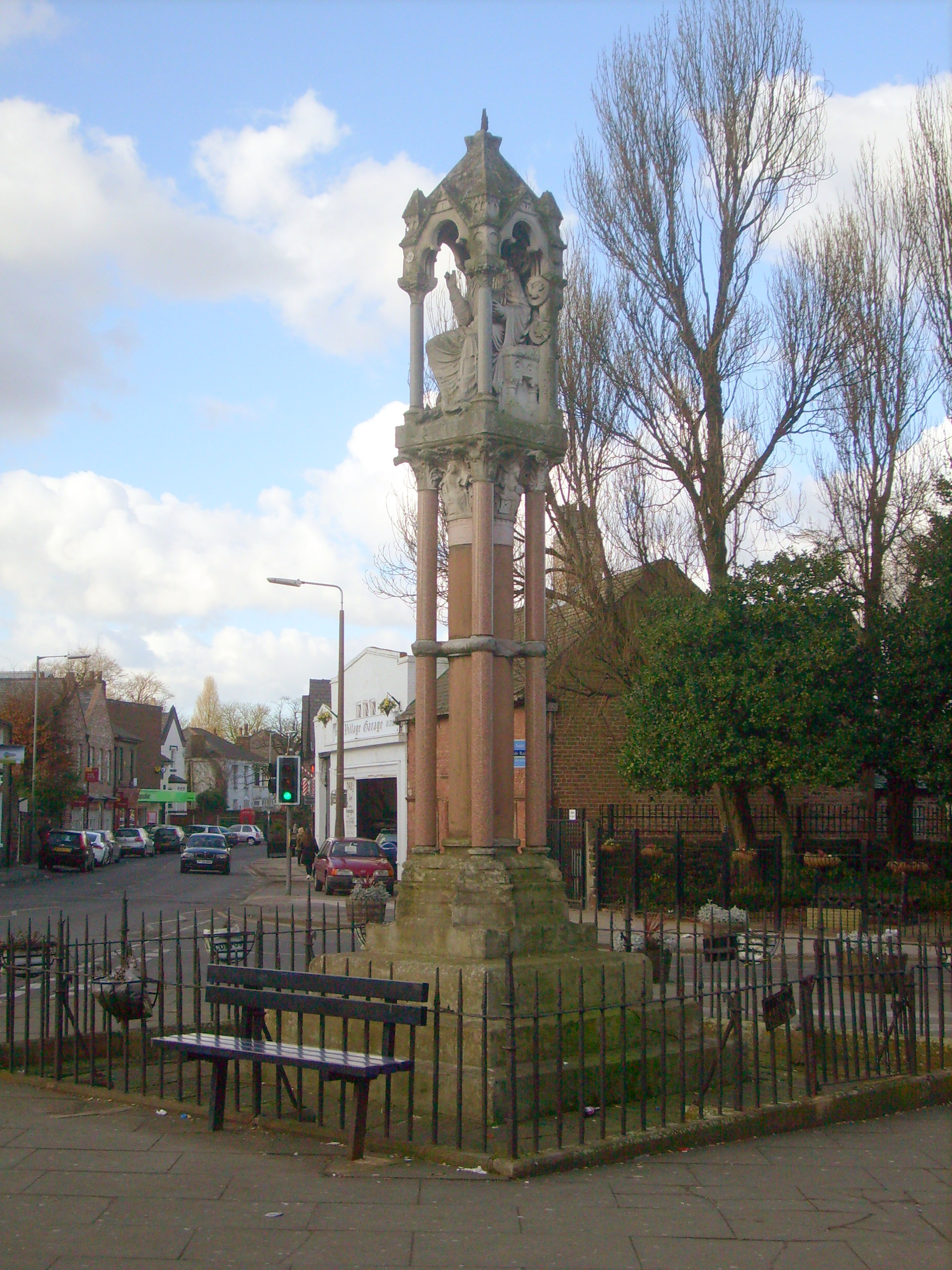
- The Village Cross in 2010

General information
- Address: West Derby, Liverpool, England
- Coordinates: 53°25′55″N 2°54′32″W
- Year(s) built: 1861–70

Design and construction
- Architect(s): William Eden Nesfield
- Designations

Listed Building – Grade II*
- Official name: Monument in West Derby Village
- Designated: 14 March 1975
- Reference no.: 1068388

The Village Cross in West Derby, Liverpool, England was designed by William Eden Nesfield between 1861 and 1870. The carved capital, of what appears to be a column rather than a cross, is supposedly of John of England, during his reign when West Derby would have been an important castle. The monument was Grade II* listed in 1975.

== See also ==
- Grade II* listed buildings in Liverpool – Suburbs
