= Church of St Philip Neri, Liverpool =

Church in Merseyside, England

Coordinates: 53.399°N 2.969°W

Church of St. Philip Neri
- The Oratory of Saint Philip Neri
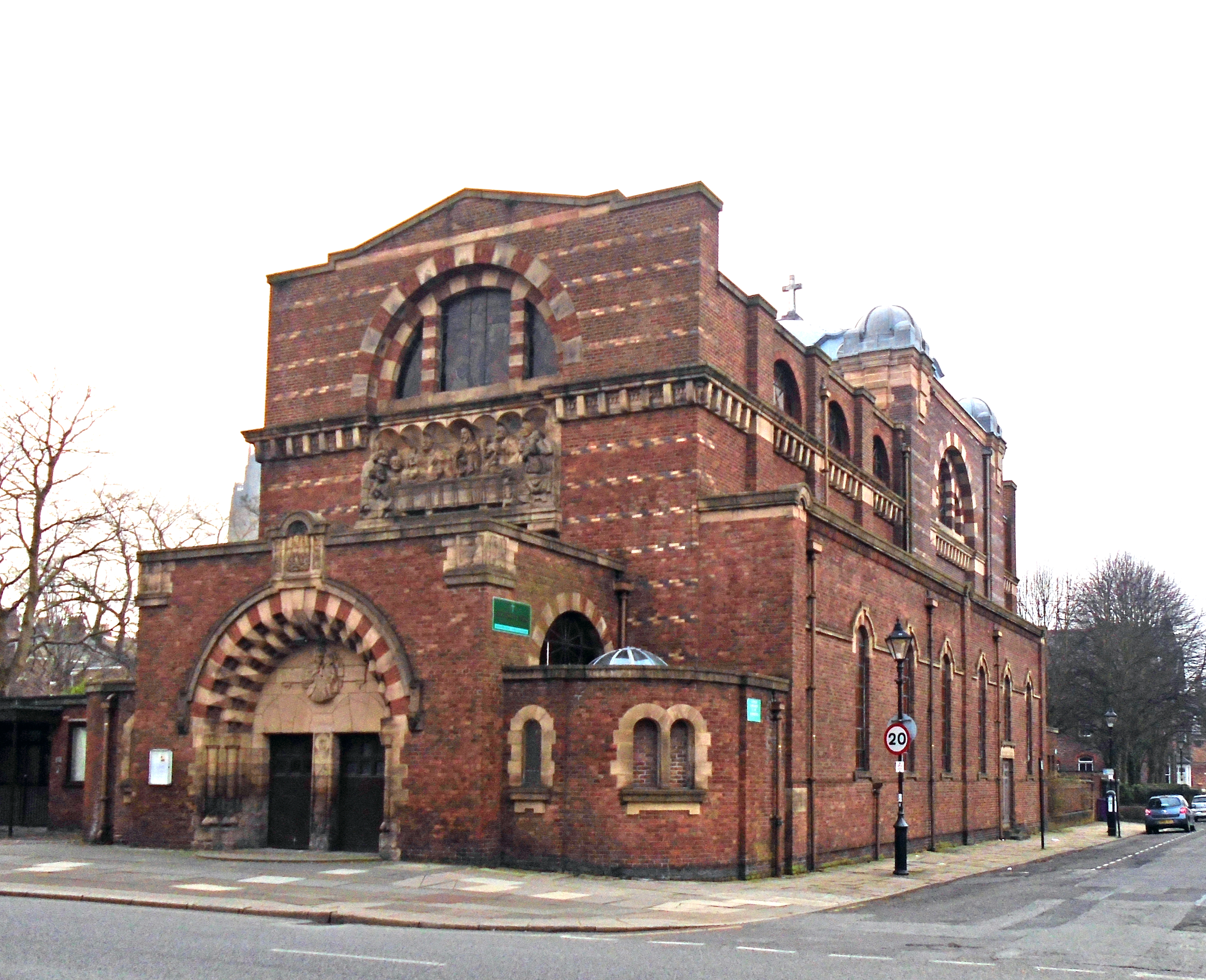
- Church of St Philip Neri from the front
- Church of St. Philip Neri
- OS grid reference: SJ 35689 89594
- Location: Catharine Street, Toxteth, Liverpool, Merseyside
- Country: England
- Denomination: Roman Catholic
- Website: www.cathchap.org.uk

History
- Status: University chaplaincy

Architecture
- Heritage designation: Grade II*
- Architect: P.S. Gilby
- Years built: 1914-1920

Administration
- Archdiocese: Archdiocese of Liverpool

The Church of St Philip Neri in Liverpool is home to the Roman Catholic chaplaincy of the University of Liverpool and Liverpool John Moores University. It was built to a Byzantine Revival design by P. S. Gilby between 1914 and 1920. There are exterior friezes depicting the Last Supper and the Virgin and Child. The latter, over the door onto Catherine Street, is inscribed with the two titles given to Mary at the Council of Ephesus in 431 AD: Latin Deipara and Greek Theotokos (God-bearer). There is also a large stone inscribed in Latin set in the wall bearing the name of Thomas (Whiteside), Archbishop of Liverpool 8 October 1916, which dates from the time the church was constructed.

The parish grew from the school named "The Institute", which opened in 1853 in nearby Hope Street. It was visited by the founder of the English Oratorians, Cardinal John Henry Newman of the Oratory of Saint Philip Neri in Edgbaston, Birmingham. The parish and later the church were dedicated to Saint Philip Neri in honour of Newman, since Philip Neri had founded the original Oratory church in Rome. Parish registers of the church dating as far back as 1864 can be inspected at the Liverpool Record Office.

In the 1950s, the then priest Fr John Garvin, transformed an adjoining bombsite into a Spanish garden, El Jardin de Nuestra Señora ('the Garden of Our Lady'). The church became the chaplaincy for the universities in Liverpool in September 2001 when the old Liverpool University chaplaincy relocated from its previous home on the cathedral precinct, opposite the University of Liverpool Guild of Students, on Mount Pleasant. The church, which is a Grade II* listed building, recently received a grant of £72,000 to help remedy water ingress damage to its mosaic tiling.

The church has six altars:

- An altar in the main nave.
- The original high altar.
- An altar with devotion to the Sacred Heart of Jesus.
- An altar with devotion to the Virgin Mary.
- A side altar with devotion to Saint Joseph.

The Church also has an altar with a devotion to Saint Gerard at the back of the main church space.

== See also ==
- Roman Catholic Archdiocese of Liverpool
