= Stanlawe Grange =

Monastic grange in Aigburth, Liverpool, England

Coordinates: 53.366°N 2.917°W

Stanlawe Grange in Aigburth, Liverpool, England, is the remains of a 13th-century monastic grange. Little remains of the original cruck frame structure. It has been constantly changed and now is a small sandstone structure.
