= Grade II* listed buildings in Liverpool suburbs =

There are over 2,500 listed buildings (Note: The actual list consists of 1,471 individual entries, which cover over 2,500 buildings and structures throughout the city.) in Liverpool, England. A listed building is one considered to be of special architectural, historical or cultural significance, which is protected from being demolished, extended or altered, unless special permission is granted by the relevant planning authorities. Of the listed buildings in Liverpool, at least 85 are classified as Grade II* and are recognised as being particularly important with more than special architectural or historic interest. The following list provides information on all the Grade II* listed buildings located in all the L postcodes outside the city centre (i.e. excluding L1, L2 and L3).

== Buildings ==
Building(s)	Location	Image	Built	Notes	Coordinates	Ref
Stanlawe Grange and The Granary	Aigburth Hall Avenue		Late 13th century	Stanlawe Grange is a late 13th-century cruck house built from sandstone. The majority of the house is dated post 15th century with more modern features added this century. Both the Grange and the adjacent granary are today private residences.	53.3653°N 2.9184°W	
Croxteth Hall	Croxteth Park		c. 1575; 1702; 1874–77		53.4425°N 2.8920°W	
Much Woolton Old School	School Lane		1610		53.3699°N 2.8663°W	
Tue Brook House	West Derby Road		1615		53.4265°N 2.9260°W	
Old Manor Court House	Almonds Green		1662	Former court house constructed for the Manor of West Derby. Single storey building with single windows on front, left side and rear. Inside are the steward's and juries benches.	53.4326°N 2.9100°W	
Stable block, Croxteth Hall	Croxteth Park		1676; 1706		53.4415°N 2.8923°W	
Allerton Hall	Woolton Road		c. 1736	Allerton Hall is an 18th-century manor house constructed from red sandstone. Standing three storeys tall and 11 bays wide, the house is crowned with a balustraded parapet and the external stonework on the ground floor is rusticated. The central bays incorporate an Ionic portico featuring unfluted columns and supporting an architrave with frieze.	53.3633°N 2.8792°W	
Church of St James	St James' Place		1774–75	The Church of St James is a former Church of England parish church designed by H.Havelock Sutton. It is constructed from brick with stone dressings and is noted for its cast iron gallery support columns, which are believed to be the oldest in Liverpool. Many components of the church date from the 19th and 20th centuries, although several items, including wall tablets and a sword rest, are believed to date the late 18th century. The church closed in the 1970s and subsequently suffered extensive damage, however, it has since reopened.	53.3943°N 2.9748°W	
University Hostel and Greenbank House	Greenbank Lane		c. 1787 or earlier		53.3851°N 2.9269°W	
Church of Holy Trinity	Church Road		1794	The Church of Holy Trinity is built from stone with a slate roof. The oldest portions, the nave and west tower, date from the end of the 18th century and were designed by J Hope. The chancel dates from 1911 and was designed by Sir Charles Herbert Reilly, who is also responsible for other amendments made to the church. The building is noted for its idiosyncratic style.	53.3945°N 2.9156°W	
Carfax	St Michael's Church Road		Pre-1815	Carfax is a two-storey house, which formerly served as a nunnery. It was constructed by iron-founder John Cragg and has since been pebble-dashed. The building incorporates a flat cornice and parapet and still possesses some of the original iron casements.	53.3765°N 2.9504°W	
The Hermitage	St Michael's Church Road		Pre-1815		53.3761°N 2.9502°W	
The Cloisters	St Michael's Road		c. 1815		53.3759°N 2.9511°W	
The Friary or Glebelands	No. 1 St Michael's Church Road		c. 1815		53.3762°N 2.9497°W	
Nos. 51, 51A, 51B, The Carriage House and gate piers to garden	St Michael's Road		c. 1815	Formerly called Hollybank.	53.3750°N 2.9481°W	
Chapel of St Patrick	Park Place		1821–27	The Chapel of St Patrick is an active Roman Catholic church designed by John Slater. It is constructed from brick with stone dressings and a slate roof, and stands two stories tall. It is topped with a frieze, cornice and blocking course. A statue of St. Patrick sits on a plinth between the ground and first floor on the front side of the building.	53.3921°N 2.9717°W	
Church of St Bride	Percy Street		1830	The Church of St Bride is an active Church of England parish church designed by Samuel Rowland. The building is designed in classical style and takes the form of a Greco-Roman temple. It is constructed from Stone with stucco cladding and incorporates a Hexastyle Ionic portico with unfluted columns.	53.3973°N 2.9690°W	
Nos. 3 to 17 (odd)	Percy Street		c. 1830		53.3975°N 2.9694°W	
Nos. 8 to 18 (even)	Percy Street		c. 1830		53.4578°N 3.0007°W	
Nos. 20 to 32 (even)	Percy Street		c. 1830	Includes No. 1 Huskinsson Street.	53.3970°N 2.9698°W	
Range on northern platform, Edge Hill station	Tunnel Road		1836		53.4027°N 2.9468°W	
Range on southern platform, Edge Hill station	Tunnel Road		1836		53.4024°N 2.9468°W	
Church of St Anne	Church Lane		1836–37	The Church of St Anne is an active Church of England parish church. Designed by Cunningham and Holme in Romanesque Revival-style it is built from stone with a slate roof. The Chancel and transepts were added later, in 1853.	53.3693°N 2.9305°W	
Church of St Clement	Beaumont Street		1840–41	The Church of St Clement is an active Church of England parish church. It is constructed from stone with a slate roof and is noted for its original early Victorian interior, including galleries on three sides supported by Tuscan-style iron columns.	53.3970°N 2.9525°W	
Bishop Eton Monastery entrance lodge	Woolton Road		c. 1840s	The entrance lodge to Bishop Eton Monastery dates to before the monastery itself. It consists of a single storey stone building with slate roof with adjacent entrance gateway, which incorporates a statue of Alphonsus Maria de' Liguori within its segmental-pointed archway.	53.3895°N 2.8954°W	
Entrance lodge, St Joseph's Home	Woolton Road		c. 1840s		53.3899°N 2.8971°W	
Liverpool Collegiate School	Shaw Street		1843		53.4131°N 2.9679°W	
St Joseph's Home	Woolton Road		1845–47		53.3895°N 2.8969°W	
Warehouse, Stanley Dock	Stanley Dock		1848		53.4220°N 2.9992°W	
Engine house on northern platform, Edge Hill station	Tunnel Road		1849		53.4026°N 2.9464°W	
Church of St Mary	Almonds Green		1853–56	The Church of St Mary is an active Church of England parish church. Designed by Sir George Gilbert Scott it is stone built with a slate roof. It is noted for its interior, especially the arcade carvings, with many internal components being the work of John Oldrid Scott. Within the church is a sundial dated 1793, from the previous church located on the site.	53.4334°N 2.9087°W	
Broughton Hall	Yew Tree Lane		c. 1856	Broughton Hall is a former merchant's house, which is today home to a secondary school. It is constructed from rock-faced stone with a pitched slate roof and incorporates elements of Tudor and gothic styles in its design. It is noted for elaborate decoration to panelling, columns and windows.	53.4247°N 2.8862°W	
Bishop Eton Monastery	Woolton Road		1858	The Bishop Eton Monastery is a three-storey Redemptorist monastery, constructed from brick with stone dressings. The building features a clock tower with a swept pyramidal roof and louvred bell stage. Originally two storeys tall, a slated mansard roof was added at a later date, as well as a connection to an adjacent chapel.	53.3890°N 2.8952°W	
Dairy, Croxteth Hall	Croxteth Park		1861–70		53.4410°N 2.8922°W	
Village Cross	Almonds Green		1861–70	The West Derby village cross was designed by Eden Nesfield in early French Gothic-style. The cross depicts a seated Christ, the hand of God, Adam & Eve and the cruxifixion above a circular stone column and four marble columns. It sits atop a square stone base of three steps and is surrounded by iron railings.	53.4328°N 2.9099°W	
Laundry and Laundry Cottage, Croxteth Hall	Croxteth Park		1864–65		53.4400°N 2.8897°W	
Allerton Priory	Allerton Road		1867–70	Allerton Priory is a former house designed by Alfred Waterhouse and built for the Lord Mayor of Liverpool John Grant Morris. It is a two-storey brick and stone building with slate roof and is noted for it canopied stone fireplace.	53.3697°N 2.8829°W	
Church of St Margaret	Princes Road		1868–69		53.3954°N 2.9657°W	
Church of St Matthew and St James	Rose Lane		1870–75		53.3764°N 2.9205°W	
Church of St Bridget	Bagot Street		1872	The Church of St Bridget is an active Church of England parish church. Designed by E. A. Heffer, the church is noted for its interior, which is in the style of an Italianate basilica. The church is constructed from brick and has a slate roof. The interior of the church primarily uses stucco with a wooden altar and marble flooring. The mosaic reredos are by the Italian glass-makers Salviati.	53.3966°N 2.9341°W	
Nos. 98–102 and 102A (even)	High Street		Late 18th century		53.3983°N 2.9176°W	
Church of St Peter	Church Road		1886–87		53.3760°N 2.8694°W	
Church of St Dunstan	Earle Road		1886–89	The Church of St Dunstan is an active Church of England parish church. It was designed by Aldridge and Deacon and is constructed from red brick with a slate roof. The church has a wagon-vaulted roof and retains original glass work in several places, notably the west window.	53.3989°N 2.9436°W	
St Agnes' Vicarage	Ullet Road		1887		53.3899°N 2.9397°W	
Palm House	Sefton Park		1896		53.3813°N 2.9353°W	
Olympia Social Club	West Derby Road		1903		53.4152°N 2.9576°W	
Liverpool Blue Coat School	Church Road		1903–06	The Liverpool Blue Coat School was designed by Briggs, Wolstenholme and Thornely and is built from red brick with stone dressings with a slate roof. The building consists or several ranges, with the front side of the building facing onto Church Road. The building is noted for its main entrance, which incorporates an aedicule flanked by Ionic columns with an open pediment, entablature and parapet. The clock tower above the entrance was added in 1915.	53.3925°N 2.9159°W	
Chapel, Liverpool Blue Coat School	Church Road		1903–06	The Chapel of the Liverpool Blue Coat School Chapel was constructed at the same time as the school itself and was designed by Briggs, Wolstenholme and Thornley. It is built from red brick with stone dressings and has Venetian windows flanked by Ionic colonnettes. Internally the chapel takes the form of a Greek Cross and has a central coffered dome with four recessed lunette windows.	53.3924°N 2.9154°W	
Church of St Philip Neri	Catherine Street		1914–20		53.3992°N 2.9687°W	
Church of St Paul	Derby Lane		1916		53.4189°N 2.9151°W	
War Memorial, churchyard of Holy Trinity Church	Church Road		c. 1920		53.3946°N 2.9143°W	
Church of St Christopher	Lorenzo Drive		1930–32	The Church of St Christopher is an active Church of England parish church. It was designed by Bernard Miller and is constructed from brick with stone dressings with a tiled roof. The church incorporates a low crossing tower, as well as two flanking chapels to the north and south.	53.4408°N 2.9249°W	
Greenbank Drive Synagogue	Greenbank Drive		1936		53.3893°N 2.9290°W	
Former Liverpool Airport Hangar 1	Speke Road		1937		53.3483°N 2.8830°W	
Former Liverpool Airport Control Tower and Terminal	Speke Road		1937–40; 1960		53.3477°N 2.8807°W	
Former Liverpool Airport Hangar 2	Speke Road		1941		53.3477°N 2.8782°W	
Tate & Lyle Sugar Silo	Regent Road		1955–57	No. 173.	53.4340°N 2.9964°W	
Cedarwood	Beaconsfield Road		1960	Cedarwood is a two-storey house designed by Gerald Beech and Dewi-Prys Thomas, noted for its irregular design. The ground floor is constructed from brick, with the first floor being entirely wooden framed. The first floor also overhangs both the front and rear of the ground floor and is supported by four Glulam beams. The roof is conical, although barely visible from the ground and the first floor windows are irregularly sized.	53.3817°N 2.8775°W	

== See also ==
Architecture of Liverpool
