= 1960 in architecture =

The year 1960 in architecture involved some significant architectural events and new buildings.

== Events ==
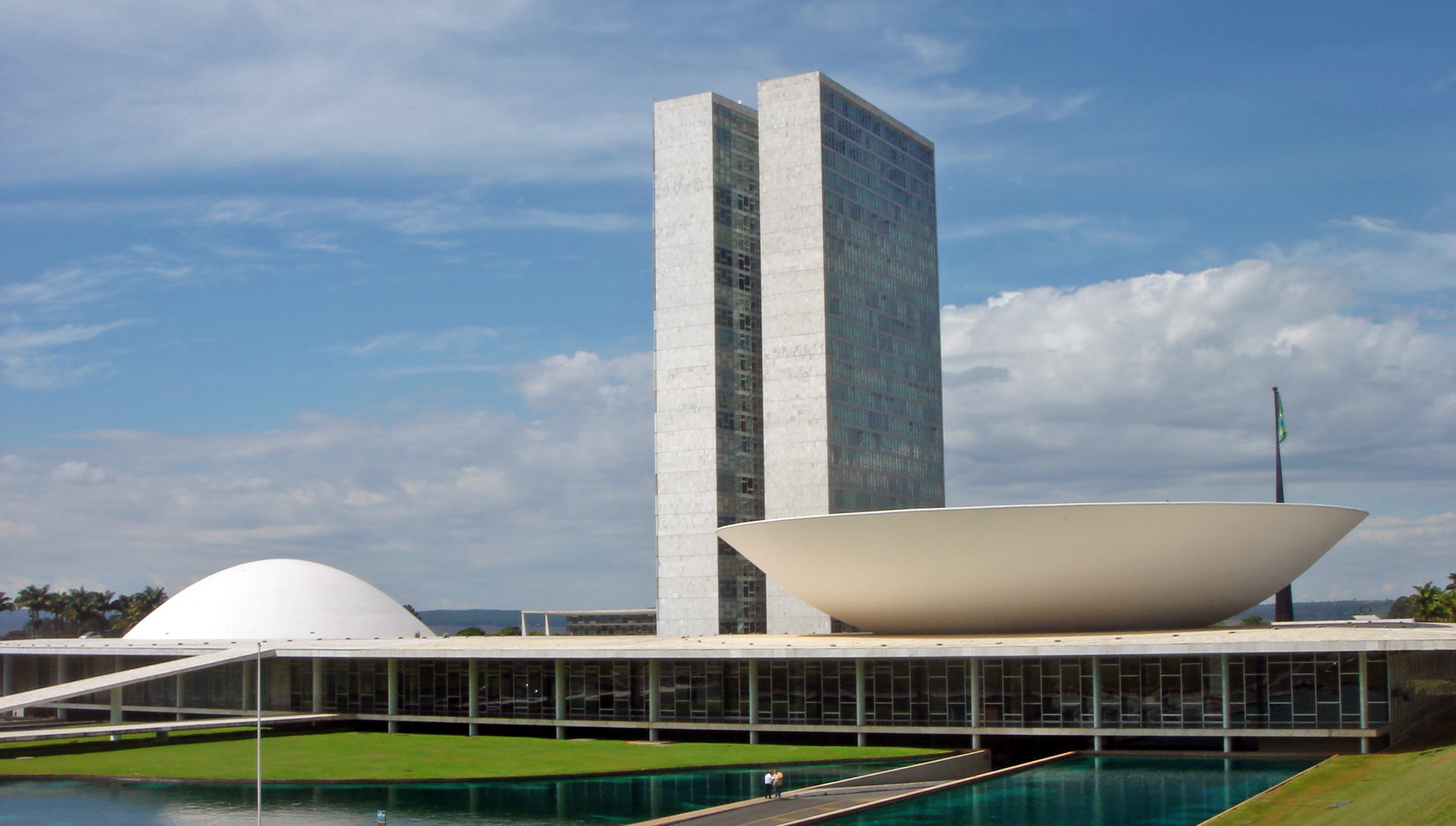
The National Congress Building in Brasília

- April 21 – Brasília is inaugurated as Brazil's new capital city, with many public buildings designed by Oscar Niemeyer (including the Palácio do Planalto). Lúcio Costa is principal urban planner and Roberto Burle Marx the landscape designer.
- Construction of the Tour Telus in Montreal, Quebec begins.
- Little Houses Improvement Scheme launched by the National Trust for Scotland to promote conservation of vernacular architecture.

== Buildings and structures ==
=== Buildings opened ===
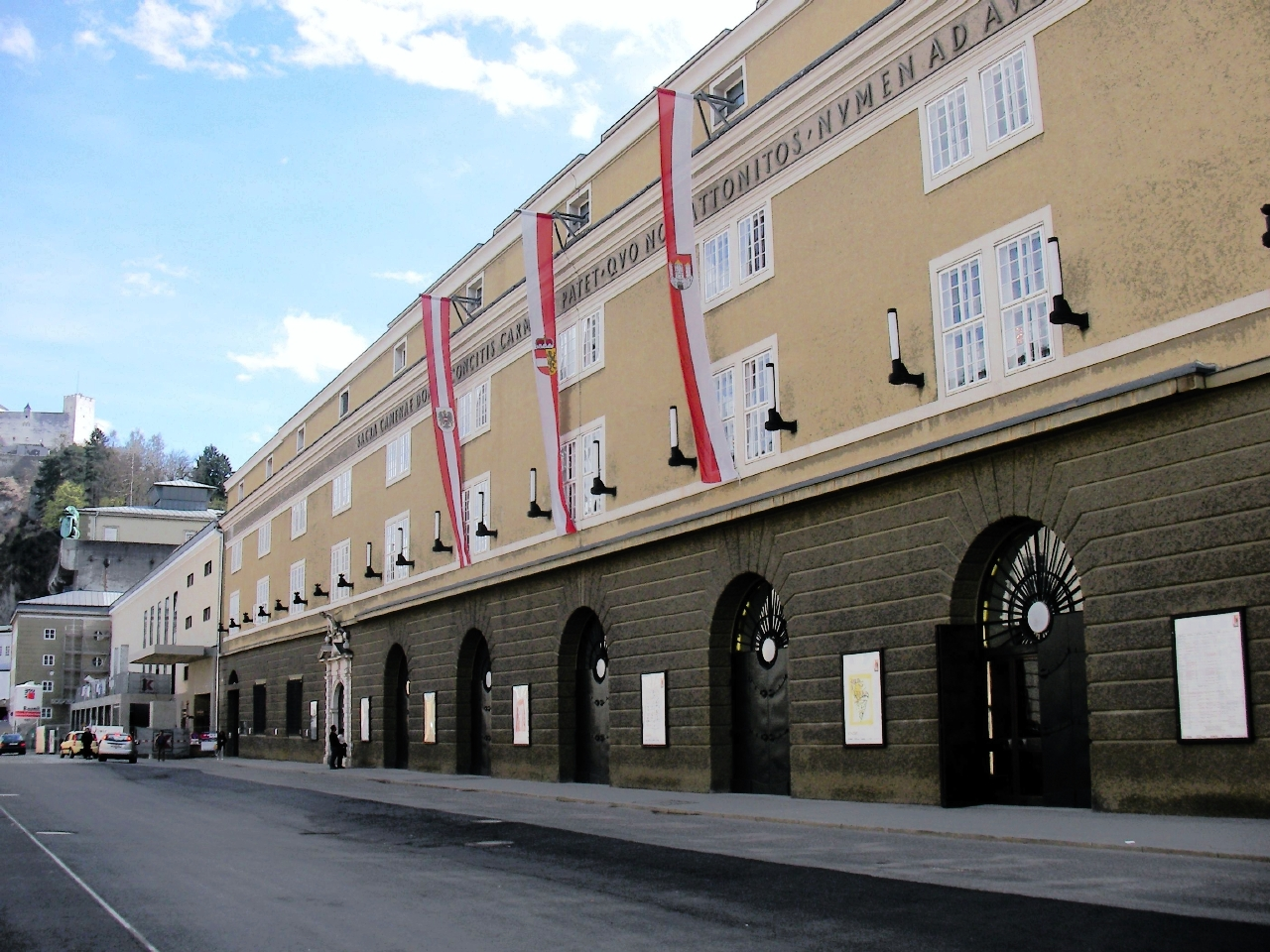
Großes Festspielhaus in Salzburg, Austria

- January 13 – Shamakhi Astrophysical Observatory in Shamakhi, Azerbaijan.
- March 16 – Araneta Coliseum in Quezon City, Philippines
- April 12 – Candlestick Park on the shore of San Francisco Bay, designed by architect John Savage Bolles.
- May 25 – Teatro General San Martín in Buenos Aires, the first major project by Argentine architect Mario Roberto Álvarez.
- June 3 – Pier Theatre, Bournemouth, England, designed by Elisabeth Scott.
- July 26 – Großes Festspielhaus for Salzburg Festival in Austria, designed by Clemens Holzmeister.
- August – Ongryu Bridge on the Taedong River in Pyongyang, North Korea.
- November 21 – Hamilton City Hall in Hamilton, Ontario, designed by Stanley Roscoe.
- American Embassy London Chancery Building, designed by Eero Saarinen.
- Climatron geodesic dome at the Missouri Botanical Garden in St. Louis, designed by R. Buckminster Fuller.

=== Buildings completed ===
Sainte Marie de La Tourette near Lyon, France

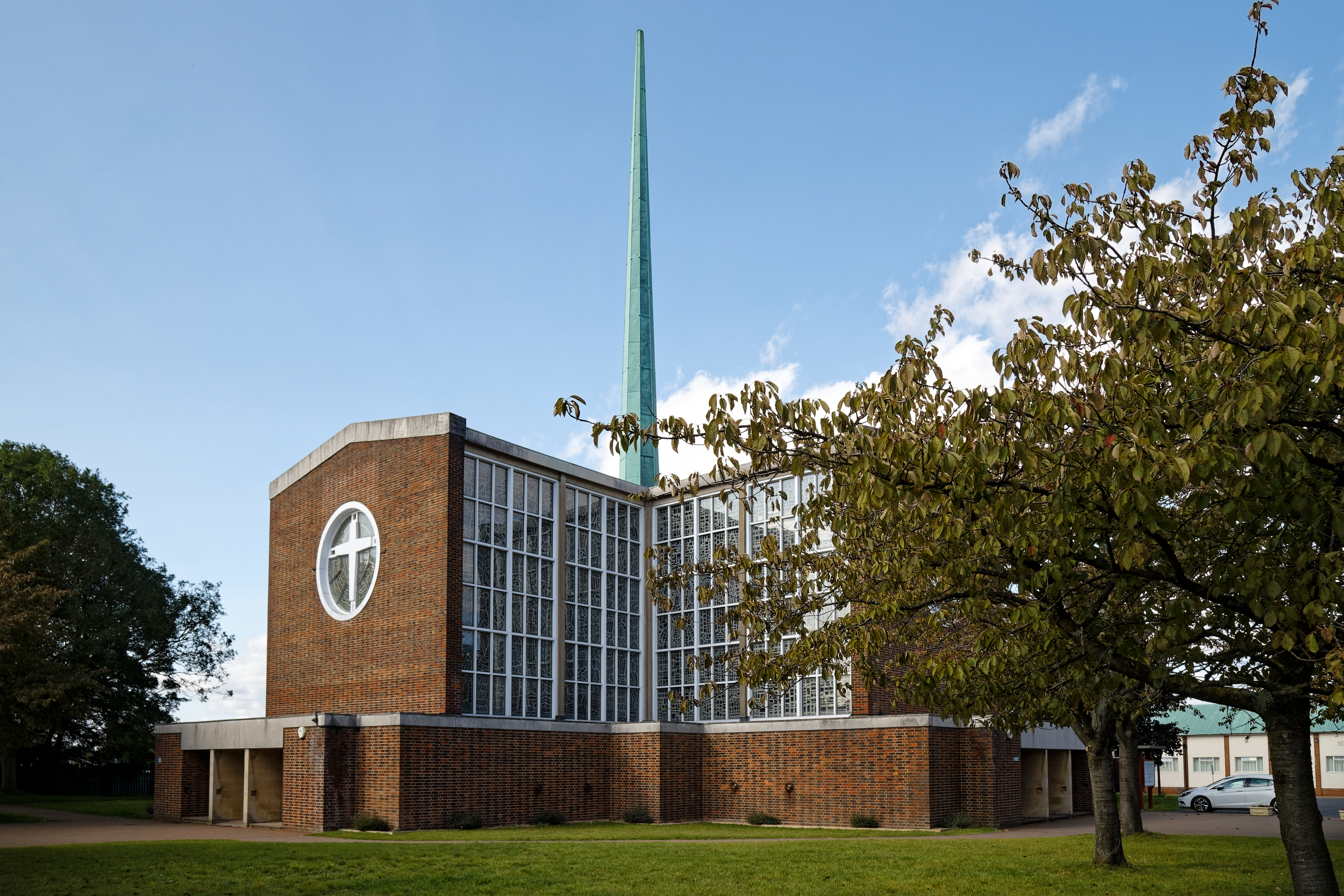
Our Lady of Fatima Church, Harlow, England, designed by Gerard Goalen

- Euromast in Rotterdam, Netherlands, from the design by Hugh Maaskant.
- Tallinn Song Festival Grounds, Estonia, designed by Alar Kotli.
- Broxbourne and Harlow Town railway stations on the Eastern Region of British Railways.
- Finlyandsky Rail Terminal is rebuilt in St. Petersburg, Russia.
- Mabel McDowell Elementary School in Columbus, Indiana, designed by architect John Carl Warnecke.
- Rutherford School, Paddington, London, designed by architects Leonard Manasseh and Ian Baker.
- Trenchard Hall, University of Ibadan, Nigeria, designed by Maxwell Fry and Jane Drew.
- Mirante do Vale in the Central Zone of São Paulo, the tallest building in Brazil, designed by engineer Waldomiro Zarzur.
- Napoli Centrale railway station and PalaLottomatica sports arena, by Italian engineer Pier Luigi Nervi, and others.
- Pirelli Tower in Milan, Italy, designed by architect Gio Ponti, with Pier Luigi Nervi and Arturo Danusso.
- Sainte Marie de La Tourette near Lyon, France, designed by Le Corbusier and Iannis Xenakis for the Dominican Order.
- Our Lady of Fatima Church in Harlow, England, designed by Gerard Goalen.
- St Andrew & St George Church in Stevenage, England, designed by Seely & Paget.
- Capuchinas Chapel, Tlalpan, Mexico City, designed by Luis Barragán.
- Cristo Obrero y Nuestra Señora de Lourdes, Estación Atlántida, Uruguay, designed by Eladio Dieste.
- St Paul's, Bow Common, London, designed by Robert Maguire and Keith Murray.
- Holy Trinity Church, Dockhead, London, designed by Harry Stuart Goodhart-Rendel.
- SAS Royal Hotel, Copenhagen, with building and furnishings designed by Arne Jacobsen.
- Ducor Intercontinental Hotel in Monrovia, Liberia, designed by Moshe Mayer.
- The Chemosphere, a house in the Hollywood Hills, California, designed by American architect John Lautner.
- Hooper House II, by architect Marcel Breuer, in Baltimore, Maryland.
- William L. Slayton House in the Cleveland Park neighborhood of Washington, D.C., designed by I. M. Pei.
- Cedarwood, a house in Woolton, Liverpool, England, designed by Dewi-Prys Thomas and Gerald Beech.
- Pipidowek, a house in Ivy Lane, Maybury, Woking, England, designed by Edward Hartry for himself (approximate date).

== Awards ==
- AIA Gold Medal – Ludwig Mies van der Rohe.
- Grand Prix de Rome, architecture – Jean-Claude Bernard.
- RAIA Gold Medal – Leslie Wilkinson.
- RIBA Royal Gold Medal – Pier Luigi Nervi.
- Knighthood – Basil Spence.

== Births ==
- July 9 – Bill Dunster, British architect and founder of Zedfactory
- September 9 – Sean Godsell, Australian footballer and architect
- October 8 – Ammar Khammash, Palestinian-Jordanian architect and designer

== Deaths ==
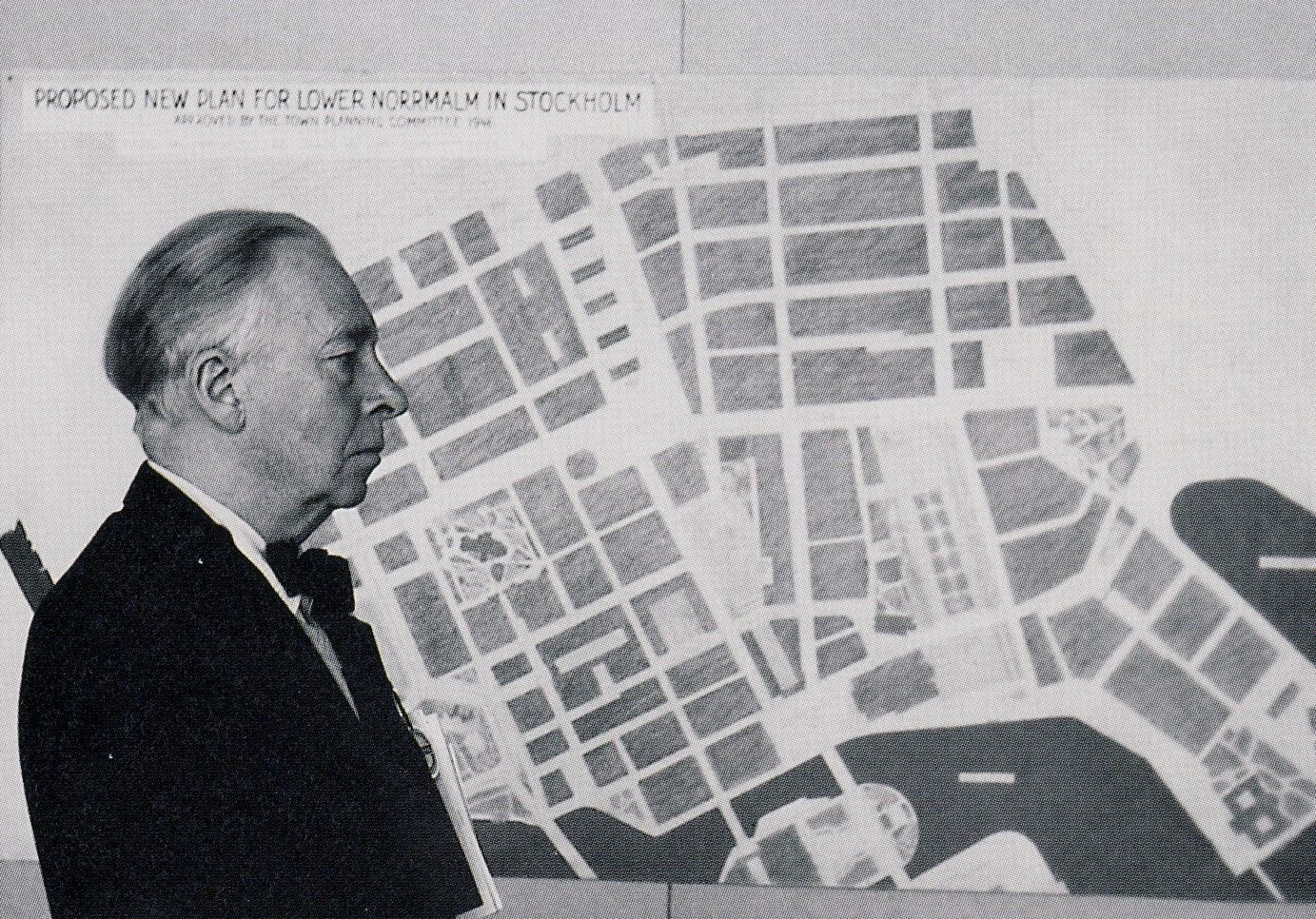
Tage William-Olsson

- February 3 – Basil Bramston Hooper, New Zealand architect (born 1876)
- February 8 – Sir Giles Gilbert Scott, English architect best known for Liverpool Cathedral and Battersea Power Station (born 1880)
- February 20 – Barry Dierks, American-born Modernist architect working chiefly on the French Riviera (born 1899)
- March 26 – W. Curtis Green, English architect (born 1875)
- March 27 – Holger Jacobsen, Danish architect best known for Stærekassen (born 1876)
- May 1 – Charles Holden, English architect best known for London Underground stations (born 1875)
- May 19 – Marcello Piacentini, Italian architect and urban theorist (born 1881)
- August 22 – Tage William-Olsson, Swedish architect and town planning architect of Gothenburg (born 1888)
- December 2 – Fritz August Breuhaus, German architect, interior designer and designer (born 1883)
- December 14
  - Antonio Barluzzi, Italian Franciscan friar and architect (born 1884)
  - Richard Konwiarz, German architect (born 1883)
- December 18 – Zeev Rechter, Israeli architect (born 1899)
- December 22 – Sir Ninian Comper, British Gothic Revival architect (born 1864)
- December 28 – F. X. Velarde, English Catholic church architect (born 1897)
- date unknown – Giuseppe Psaila, Maltese Art Nouveau architect (born 1891)
