= Woolton Hall =

Country house in Liverpool

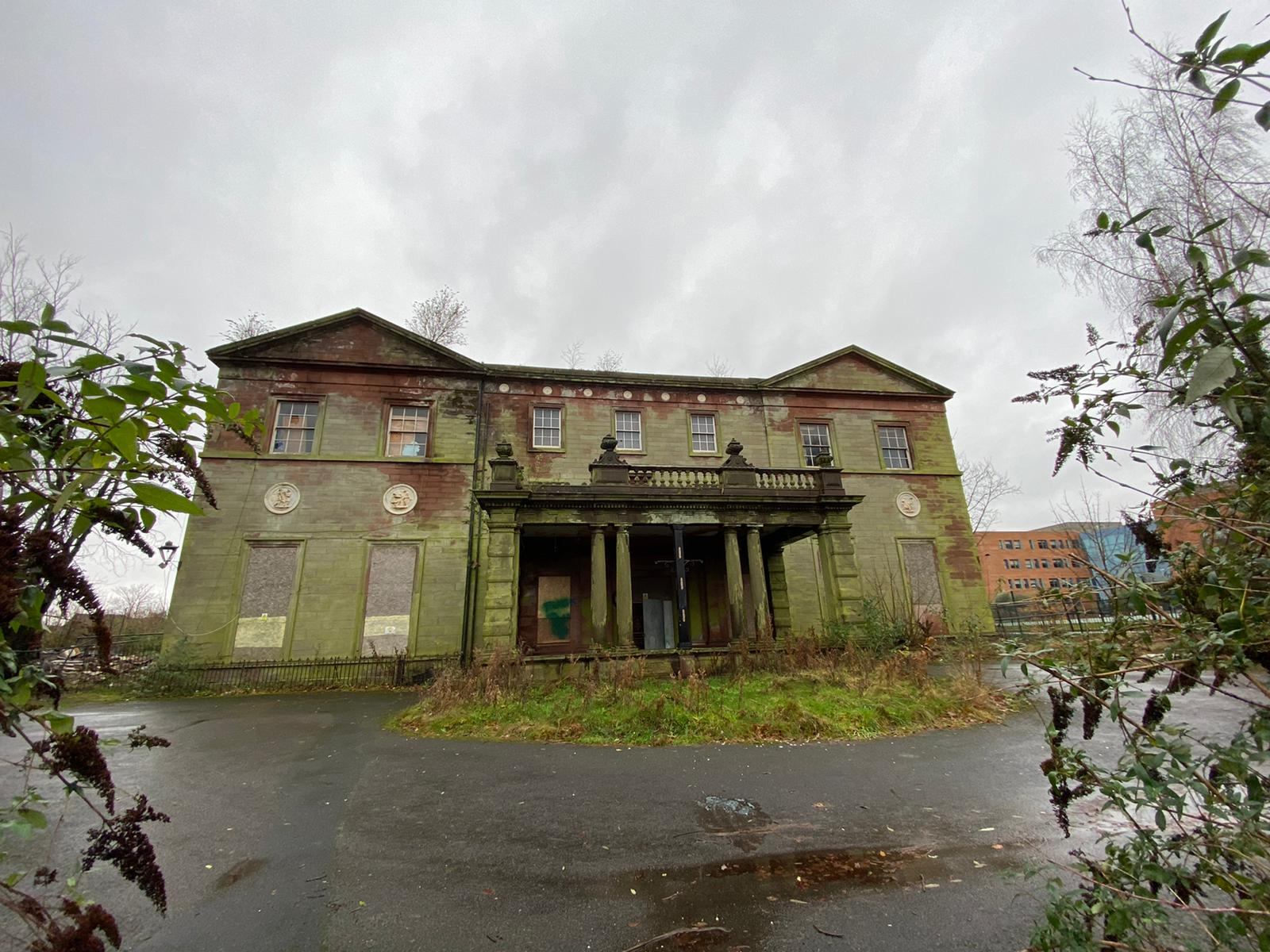
- Woolton Hall in 2020.

- Location in Merseyside
- 53.3718°N 2.8649°W
- Location: Woolton
- Nearest city: Liverpool

History
- Built: 1704, 1772–1780
- Built for: Richard Molyneux

Site notes
- Area: 3.92 acres (15,900 m^{2})
- Architect: Robert Adam (part)
- Architectural style: Neoclassical

Listed Building – Grade I
- Designated: 28 June 1982
- Reference no.: 1217943

Woolton Hall is a ruined country house located in Woolton, a suburb of Liverpool, England. The earliest parts of the house date to approximately the seventeenth century, but the majority dates from the early eighteenth century and from a remodelling undertaken between 1774 and 1780 by the architect Robert Adam.

The north wing of the hall was commissioned for Richard Molyneux, later fifth viscount Molyneux. The east wing dates from the seventeenth century or earlier and was extensively remodelled by Adam for the then owner, Nicholas Ashton. The porte-cochère in front of the east wing replaced a small porch and dates from c. 1865, as does the apsidal bay window of the north wing. Internally, the ground floor of the north wing contained a suite of rooms with early eighteenth century bolection panelling, and the east wing rooms were decorated with Adam plasterwork.

During the 20th century the hall went through a number of uses, eventually becoming a school in the 1950s, and later being abandoned with plans for its demolition. A campaign against its destruction was successful and the hall was made a Grade I listed building in 1982. Despite this, it continued to deteriorate and was declared at "immediate risk" by Historic England in 2021. Outbuildings were set alight in 2019, and in August 2025 the hall was gutted in another fire.

== History ==
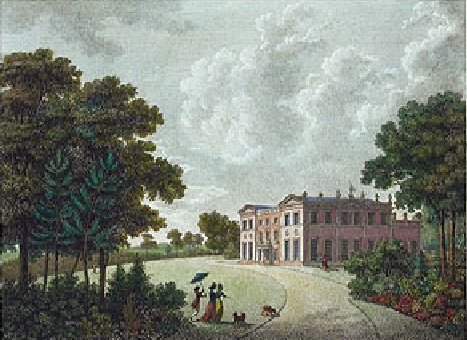
1781 watercolour by Paul Sandby

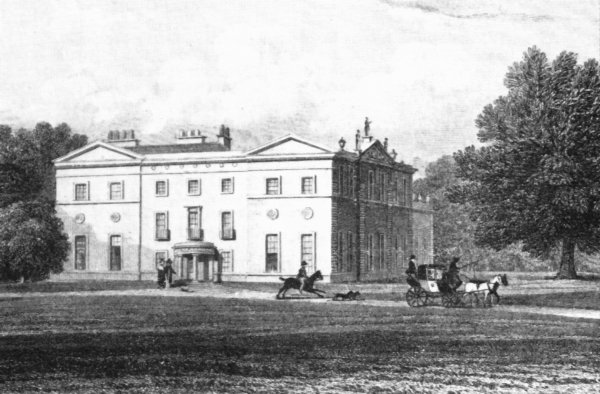
1819 engraving by J.P. Neale

It is unknown who owned the land on which Woolton Hall now stands during the Middle Ages, but its owners during the Tudor period, the Brettarghs of Little Woolton, may have acquired it from a family named de Woolton. From the Brettarghs it passed to the Broughton family, and was in 1704 sold to Richard Molyneux, later fifth viscount Molyneux. Molyneux's widow died at Woolton Hall in 1766 and the house was soon after sold to a Mr Booth, who in 1772 sold it to Nicholas Ashton, a former High Sheriff of Lancashire. Shortly afterwards, Ashton commissioned the noted architect Robert Adam to remodel and expand the building.

The hall remained in the Ashton family until 1865, when Nicholas' grandson Charles Ellis sold it to James Reddecliffe Jeffery, the owner of the department store Compton House, on Church Street, Liverpool. A fire at the store on 1 December 1865 destroyed much of Jeffery's uninsured stock, eventually leading to the business failing and Woolton Hall being put up for auction in 1869.

Woolton was in the possession of the shipowner Frederick Richards Leyland in 1877. However, it is unclear whether he bought the hall from Jefferey or from the trustees of the Watt family, who according to A J Tibbles had bought the property in 1871. Leyland had been leasing nearby Speke Hall from the Watts; however in 1877 Adelaide Watt reached her majority and decided to move into Speke. Leyland was an art collector, and although the bulk of his collection was displayed at his London house, 49 Prince's Gate, Edward Burne-Jones's Night and Day and Ford Madox Brown's The Entombment were hung at Woolton.

Leyland died in 1892, and by 1898 Woolton Hall was owned by Peter McGuffie and run as a hydropathic hotel. The hall was repurposed as a military hospital during World War I and was the headquarters of the Middlesex Regiment during World War II; after this it was used as a school by the Sisters of Notre Dame until 1970. The hall was threatened with demolition in the 1980s but instead bought by local resident John Hibbert, who spent £100,000 on refurbishments to enable the hall to be used for parties. Woolton Hall was granted grade I listed building status on 28 June 1982.

In 2005, there were plans to convert the house into a retirement home and build 62 new retirement flats on the grounds of the estate. The work did not take place and the disused hall fell into disrepair. A fire in outbuildings in 2019 was attributed to arson; following that and incidents of vandalism, in 2021 the building was added to Historic England's Heritage at Risk Register as a category A site, meaning it was at "immediate risk of further rapid deterioration or loss of fabric". A second fire on the night of 19 August 2025 was reported by the BBC and the Independent to have "gutted" the building, leaving only interior and exterior walls standing. Young people had been observed gathering near the building before the fire broke out, and a fourteen-year-old girl was arrested and bailed on suspicion of arson.

== Architecture ==
=== Exterior ===
The hall is built primarily of the local red sandstone, with some brick on the south side of the north wing. The north wing is eight bays long, and was commissioned by Richard Molyneux in 1704 or c. 1709–1714. The eastern six bays are of two storeys and have a pediment decorated with trophies over the central two bays; the western two bays are of one storey and slightly later. The wing bears some similarities to Croxteth Hall, another Molyneux property, and the Manor House in nearby Hale.

The east wing is attached to the eastern end of the north wing at right angles and is seven bays long. The outer two bays on each side break forward slightly and are of two storeys with pediments above and medallions between the windows. The central three bays are of three storeys and are fronted by a porte-cochère of c. 1865 consisting of four paired Doric columns between rusticated antae. The building had three-storey extensions to the south and west which were demolished in the 1970s.

In the Buildings of England volume covering Woolton Hall, the exterior of the building is considered architecturally undistinguished and the extent of Adam's oversight is questioned.

=== Interior ===
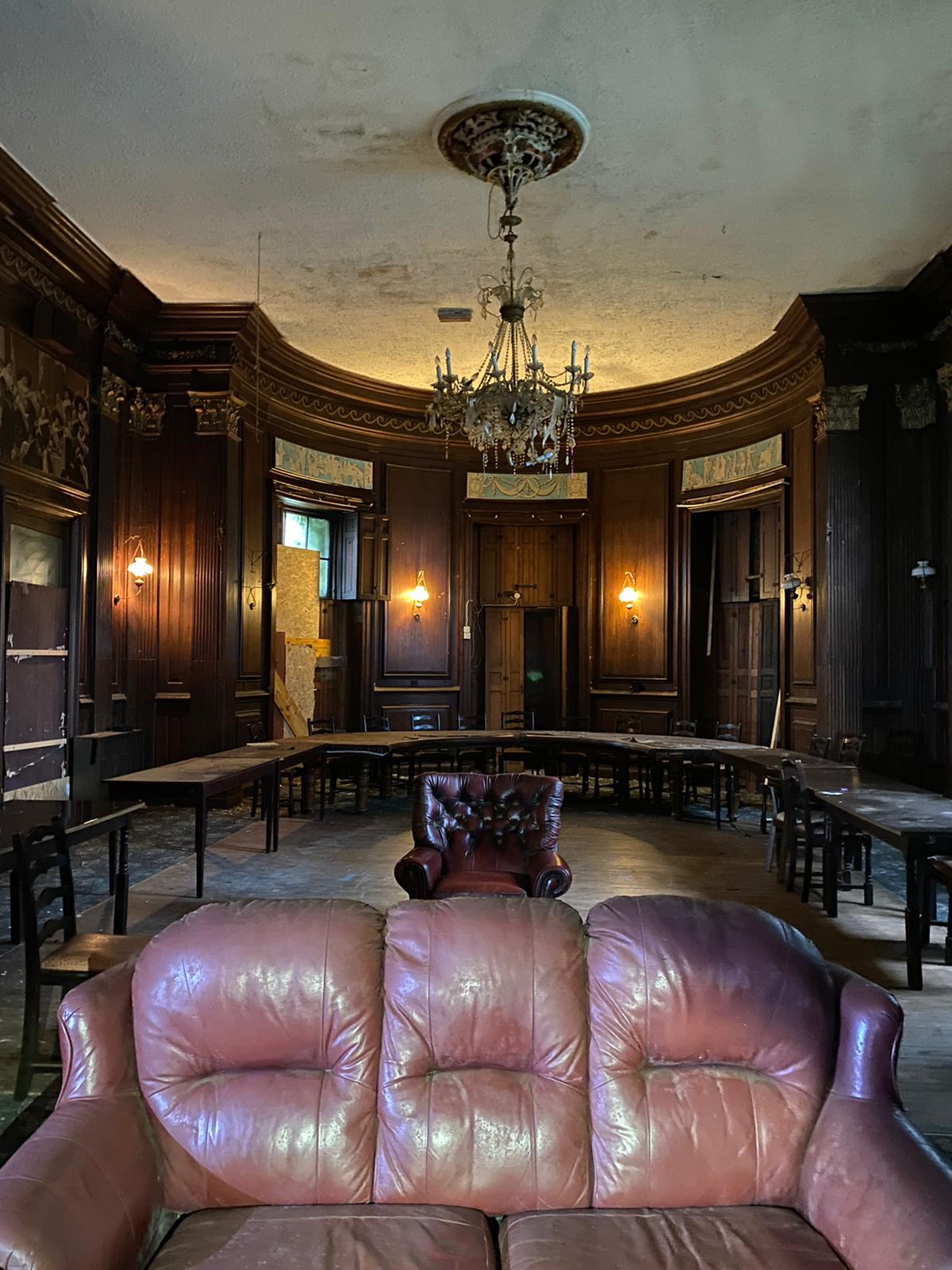
Tapestry Room.

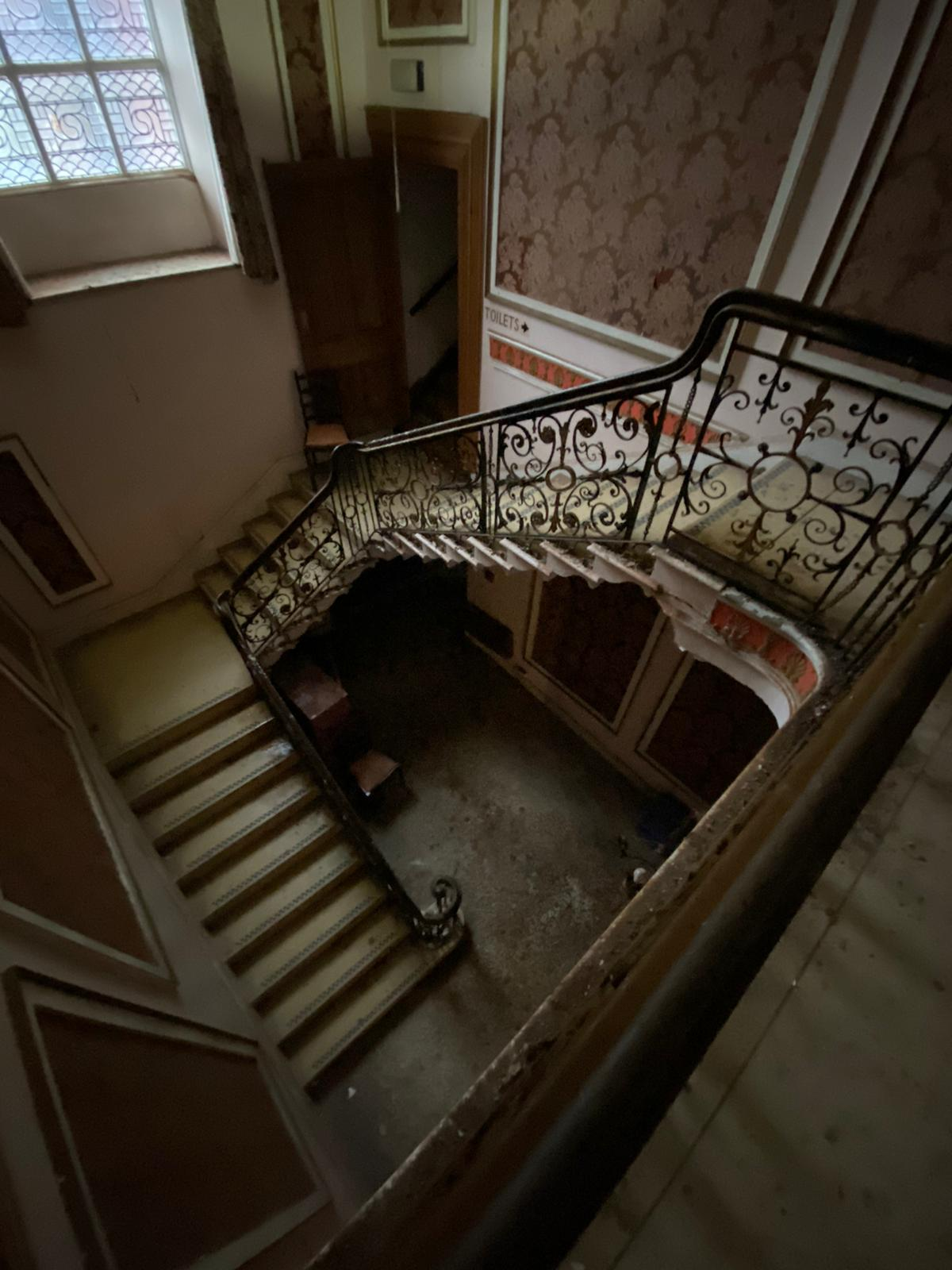
Principal staircase

The ground floor of the north wing originally contained three principal rooms; a salon in the eastern three bays, the tapestry room in the centre, and the drawing room in the western three bays. The bay between the salon and tapestry room contained lobbies and a staircase. The rooms were approximately 5.2m high and originally had coved ceilings which made them higher still. The tapestry room and were combined into one room before World War Two. All three rooms were decorated with eighteenth century bolection oak panelling with classical pilasters.

The salon was at the junction of the north and east wings, and the wall between it and the rest of the east wing was a surviving fragment of the earlier house on the site. To its south was the entrance hall, which occupied the centre three bays of the wing and behind which lay the principal staircase and the octagon room. The front parlour occupied the south-east corner of the wing, with the kitchen behind. The octagon room, which was described as a library in an 1823 account of the house, the front parlour, and an upstairs room had stucco ceilings characteristic of Adam. The principal staircase was also by Adam, and had a wrought iron baluster and a moulded mahogany handrail.

== Paintings ==
The hall contained a number of replica paintings, including those of former residents; most of the originals had been relocated to the Walker Art Gallery.

Tapestry Room

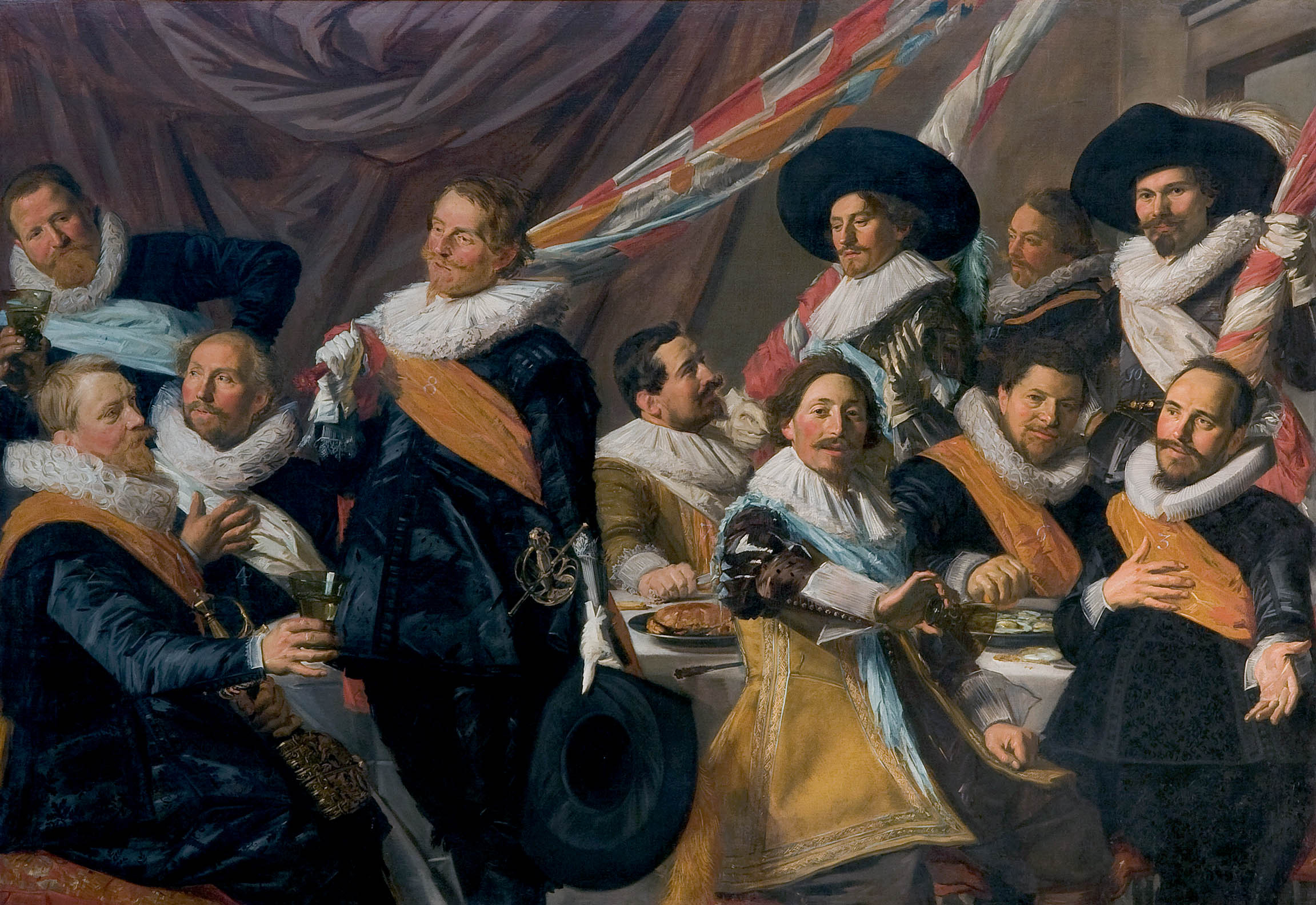
Officers of the St. George Civic Guard, Haarlem – Frans Hals

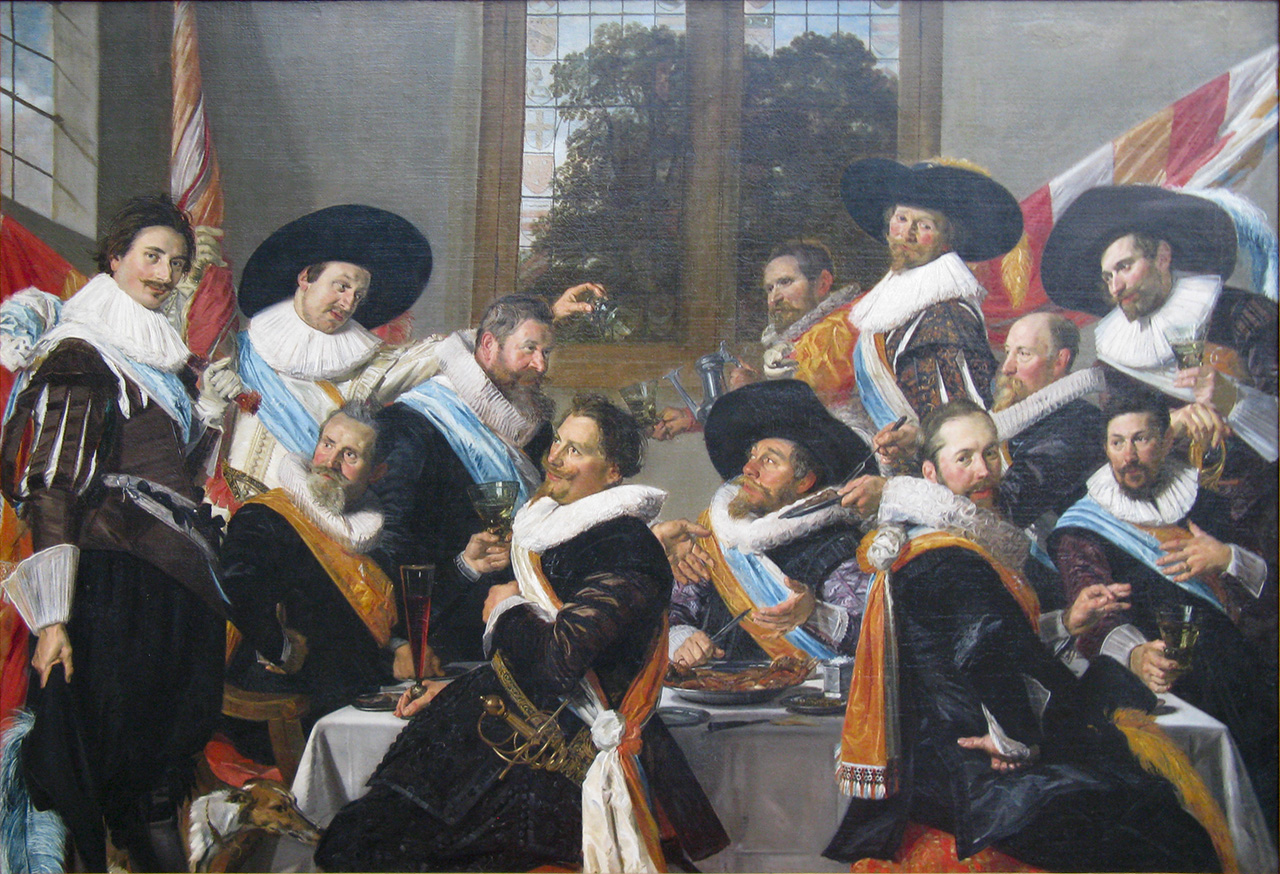
Banquet of the officers of the Calivermen Civic Guard, Haarlem – Frans Hals

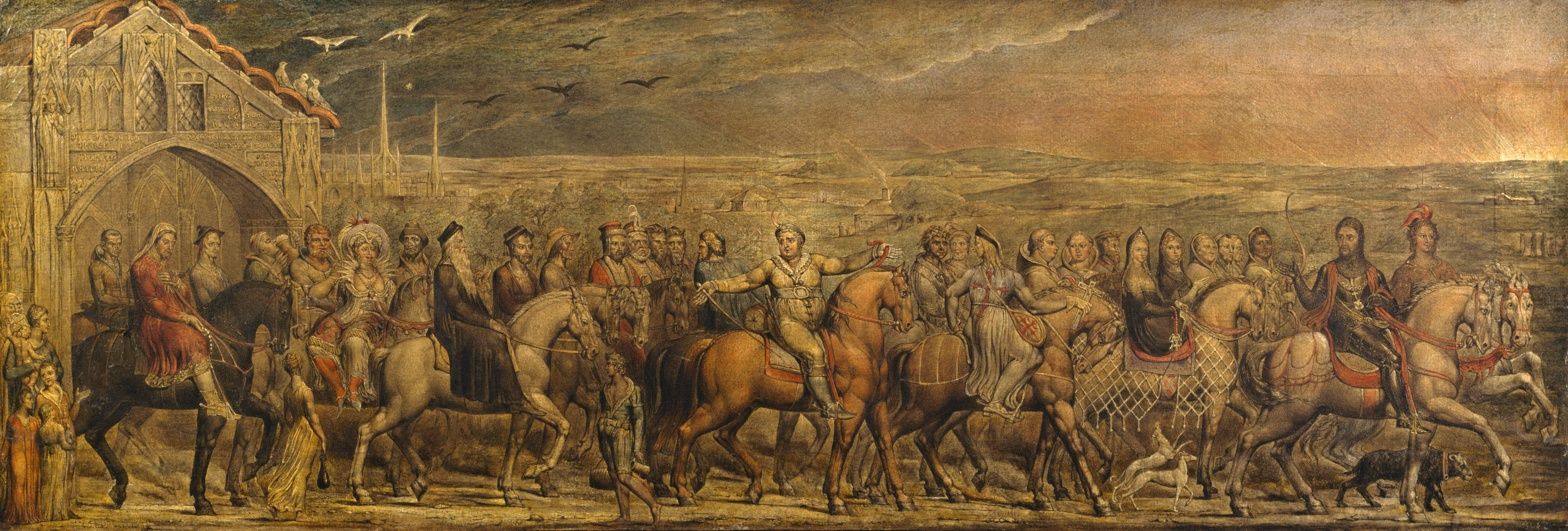
Canterbury Pilgrims – William Blake

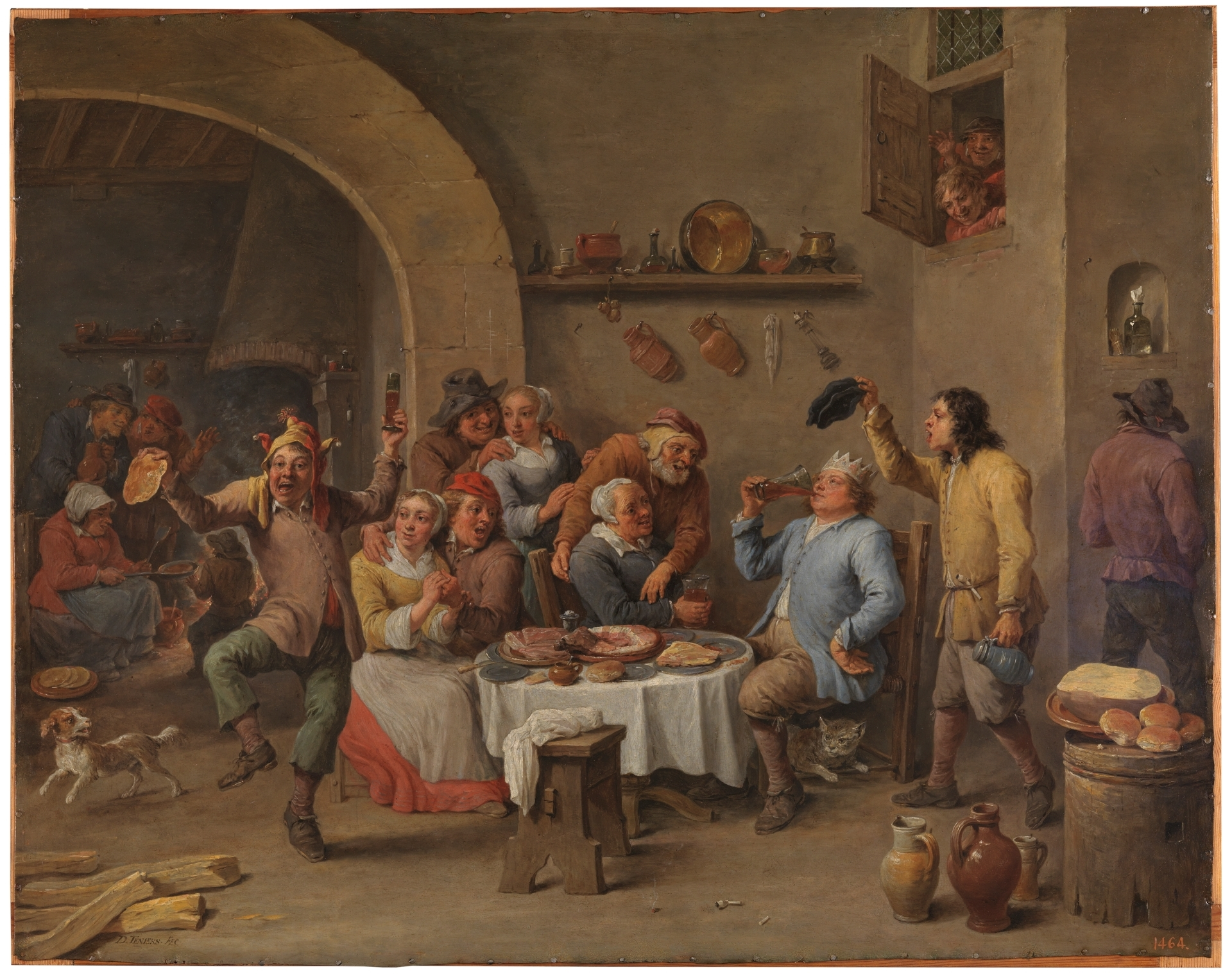
Twelfth-night – David Teniers the Younger

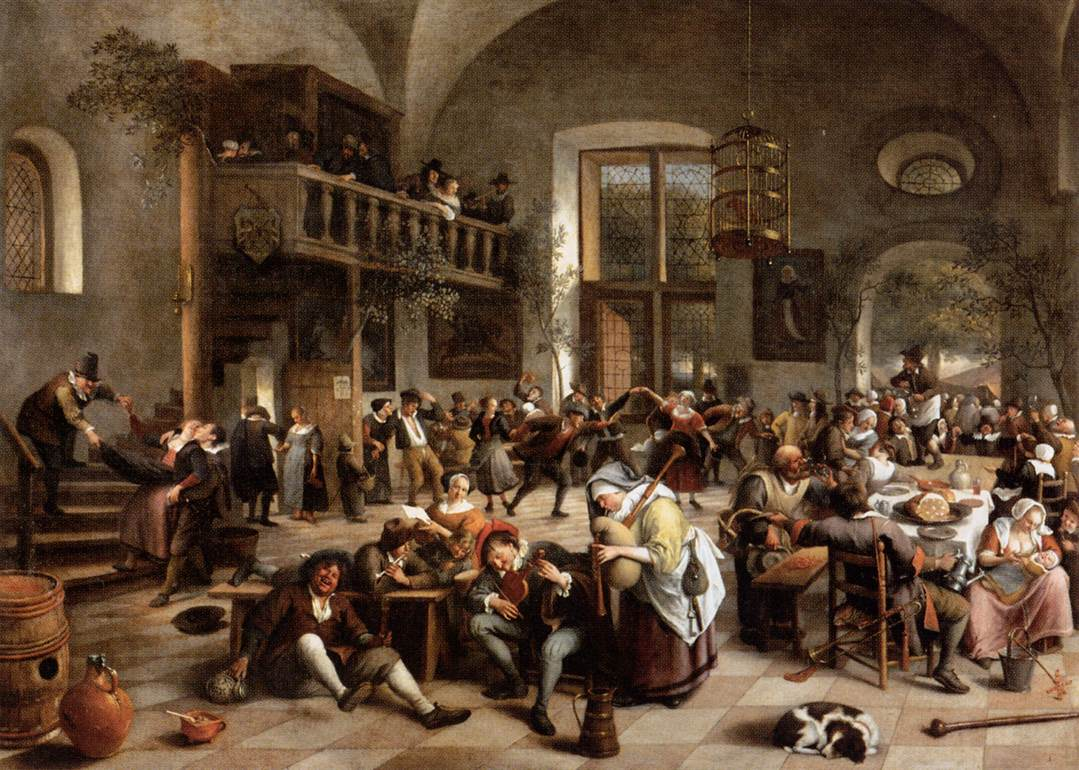
Revelry at an Inn – Jan Steen

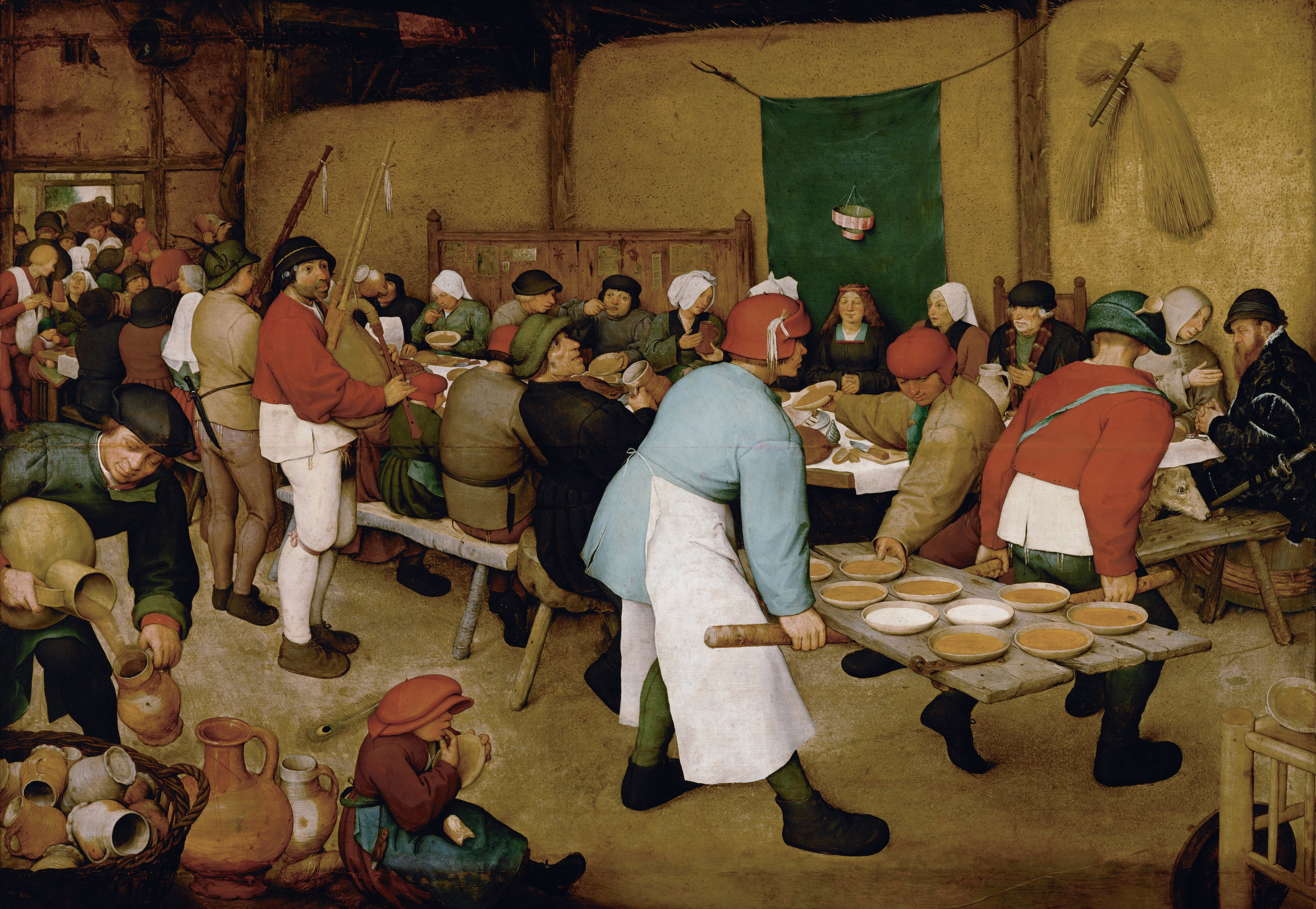
The Peasant Wedding – Pieter Brueghel the Elder

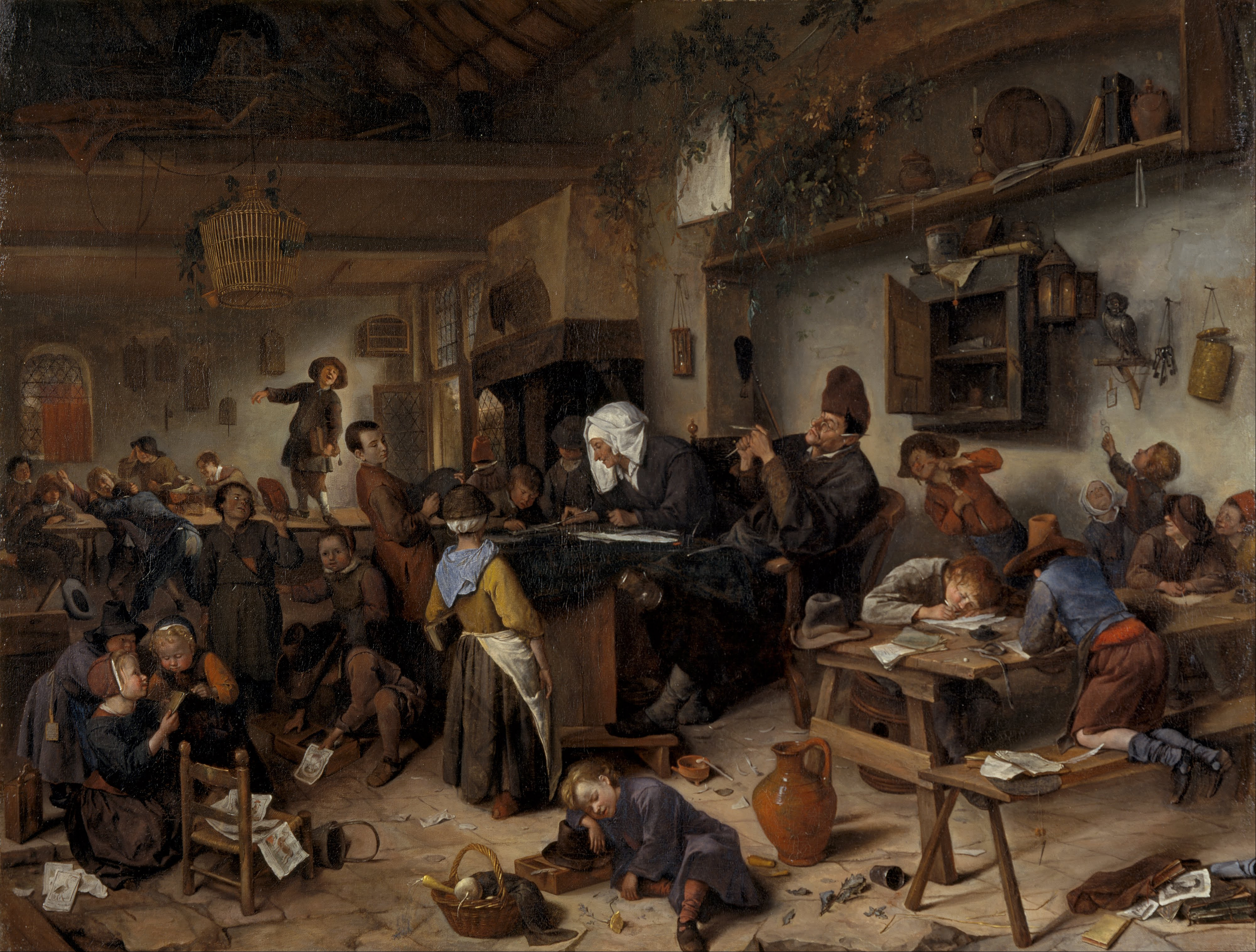
A School for Boys and Girls – Jan Steen
Dance Hall

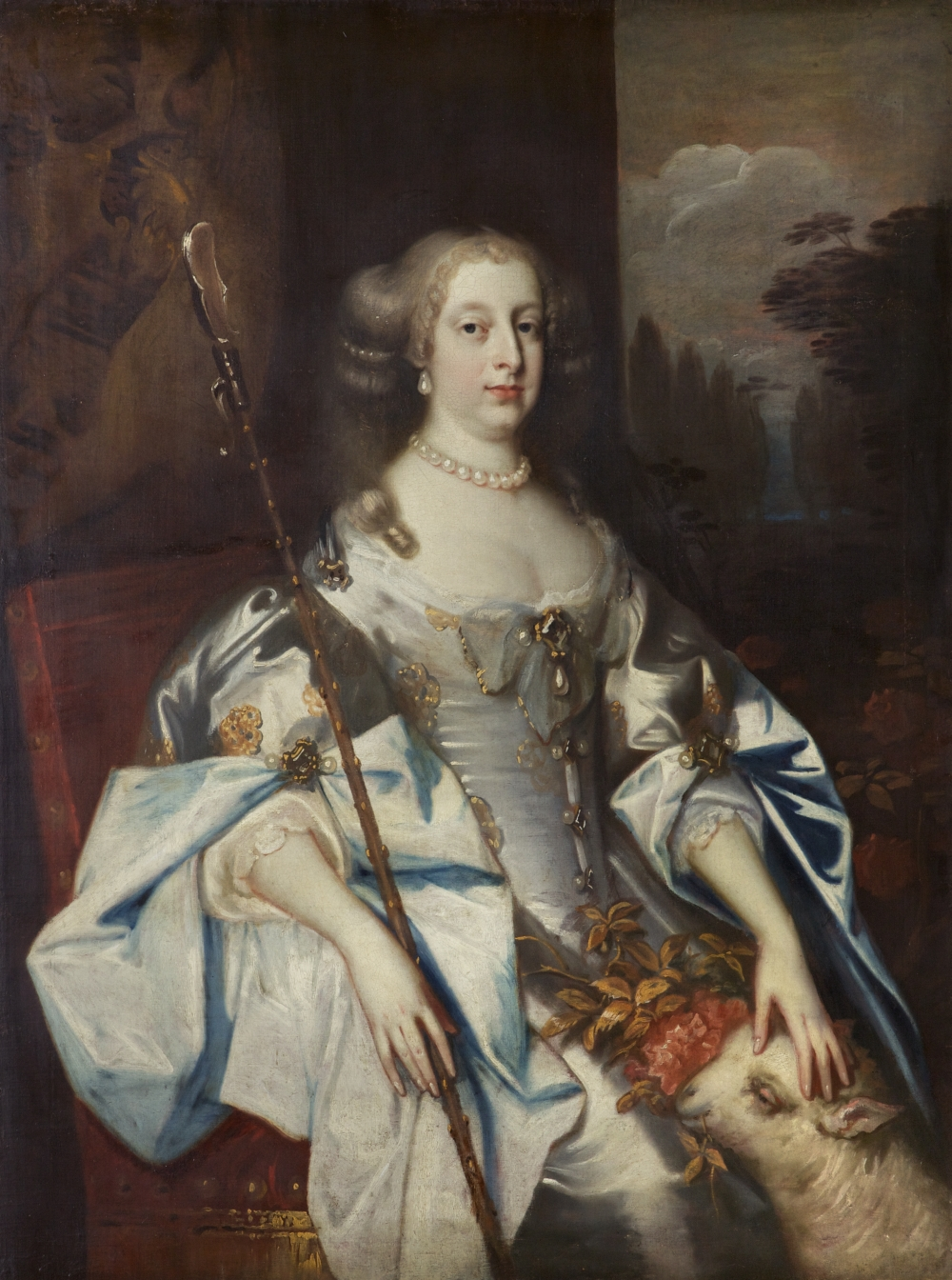
Lady Mary Molyneux – Jacob Huysmans

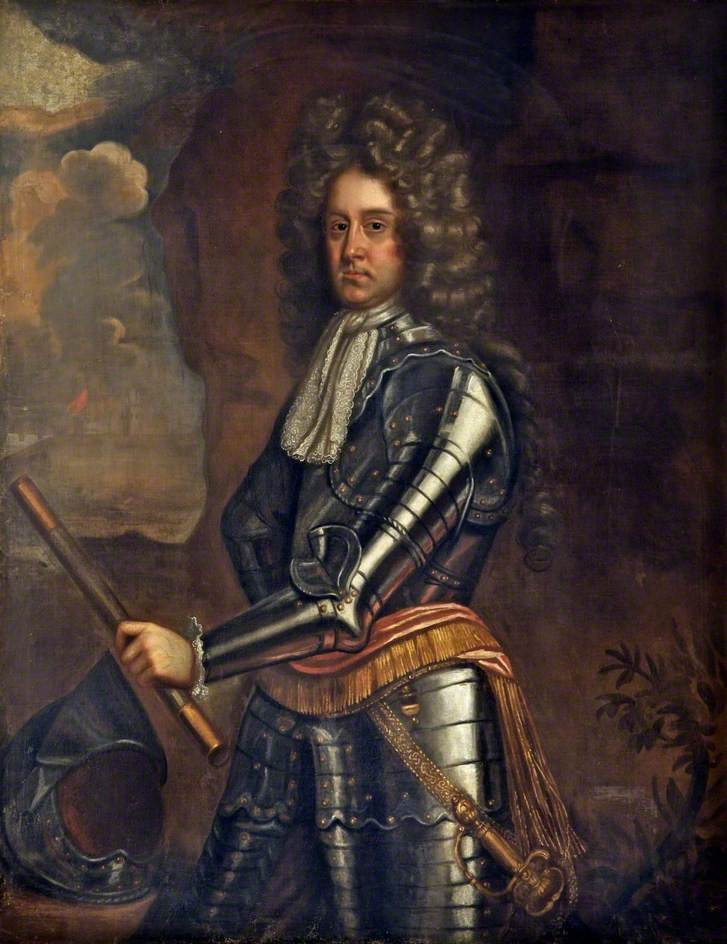
A man of the Molyneux family, possibly 4th Viscount Molyneux – Unknown Artist

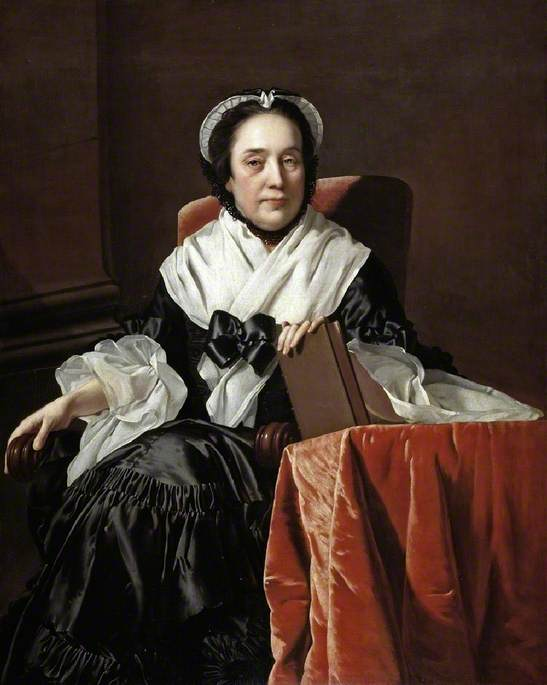
Mrs John Ashton – Joseph Wright of Derby

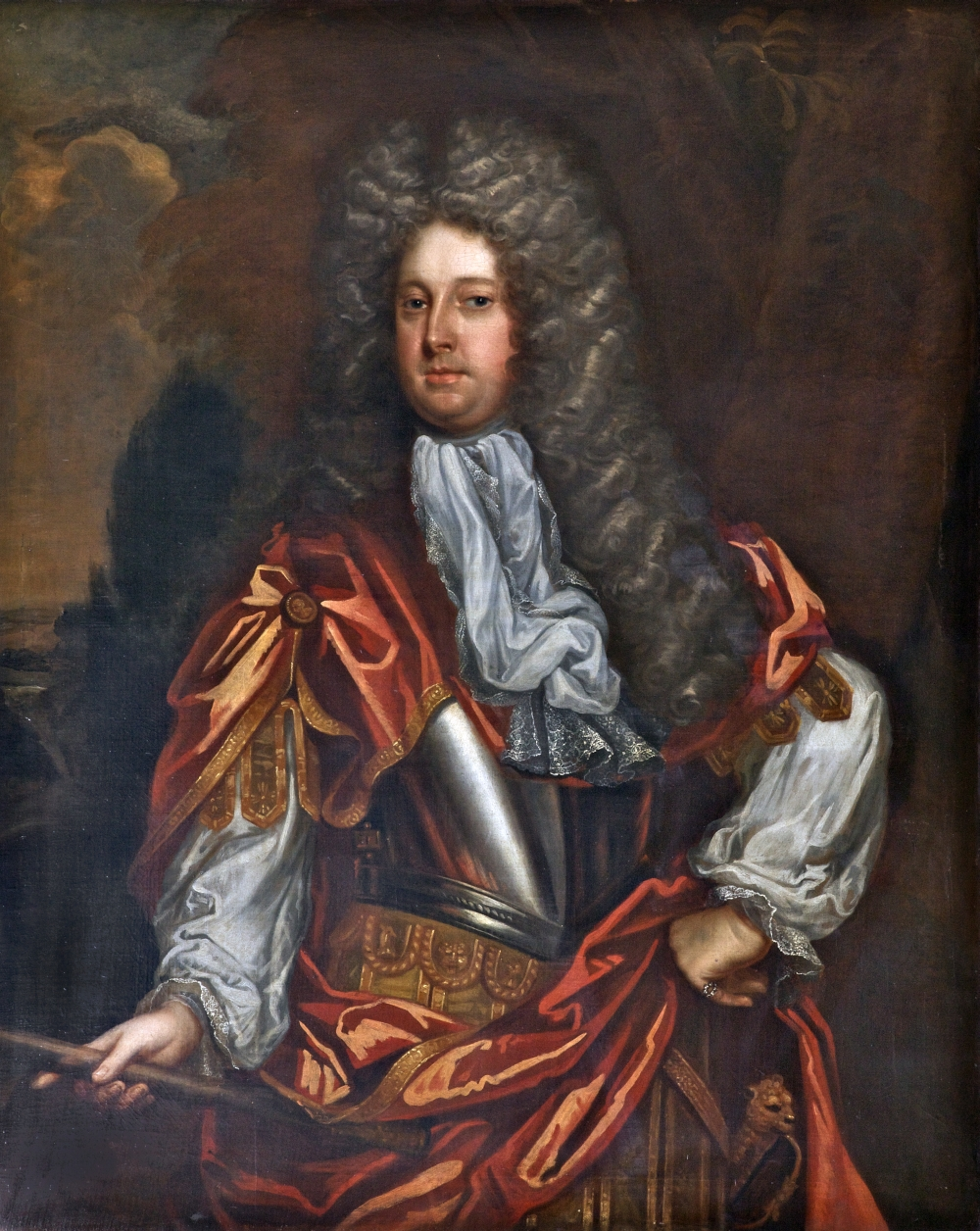
Sir Richard Molyneux, 1st Baronet – Unknown Artist

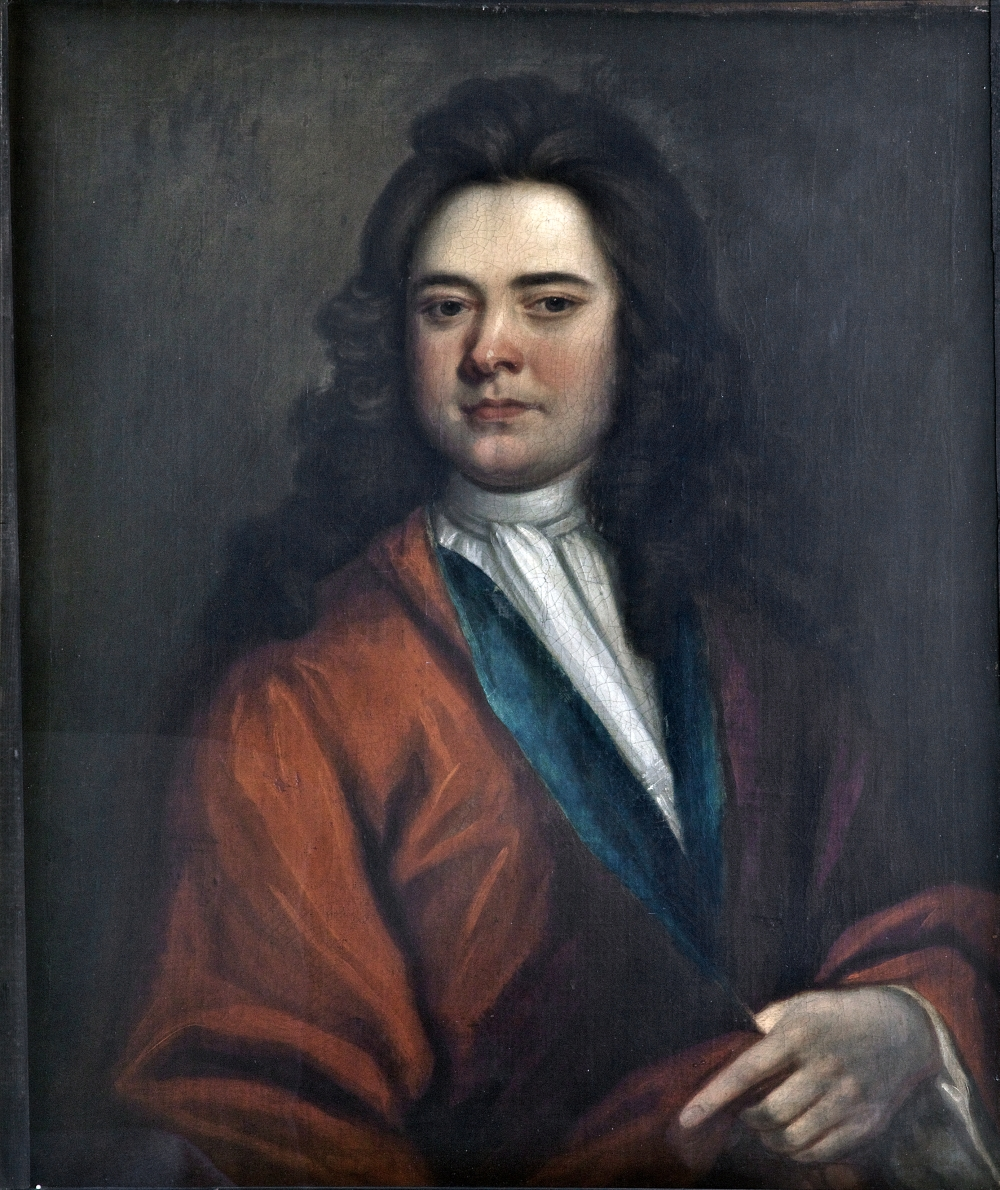
A man of the Molyneux family – Unknown Artist

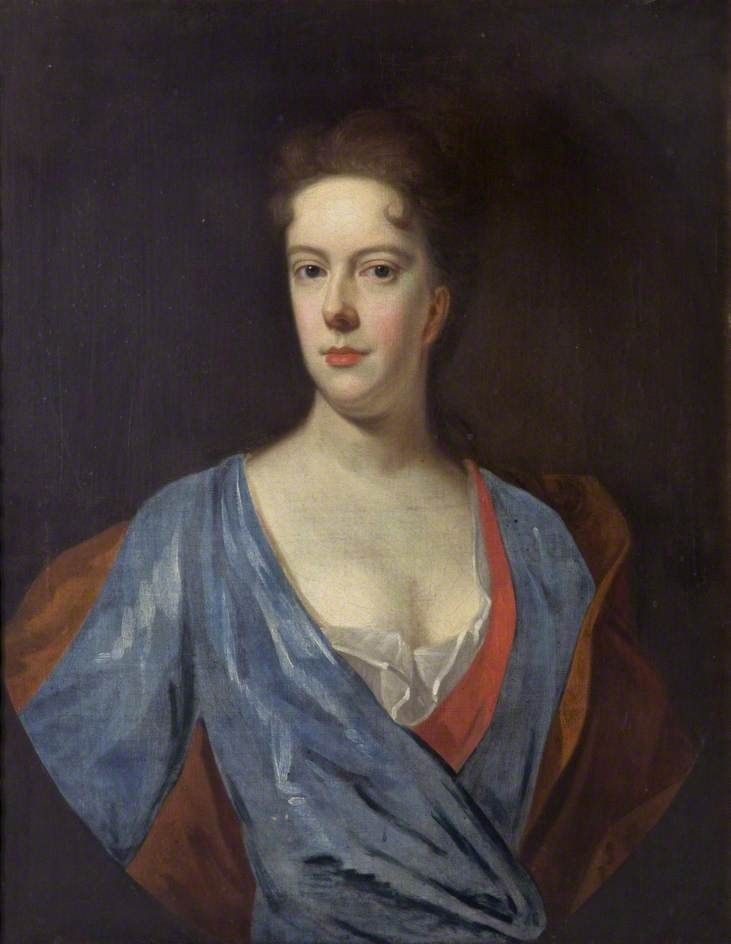
Mary Molyneux – Unknown Artist

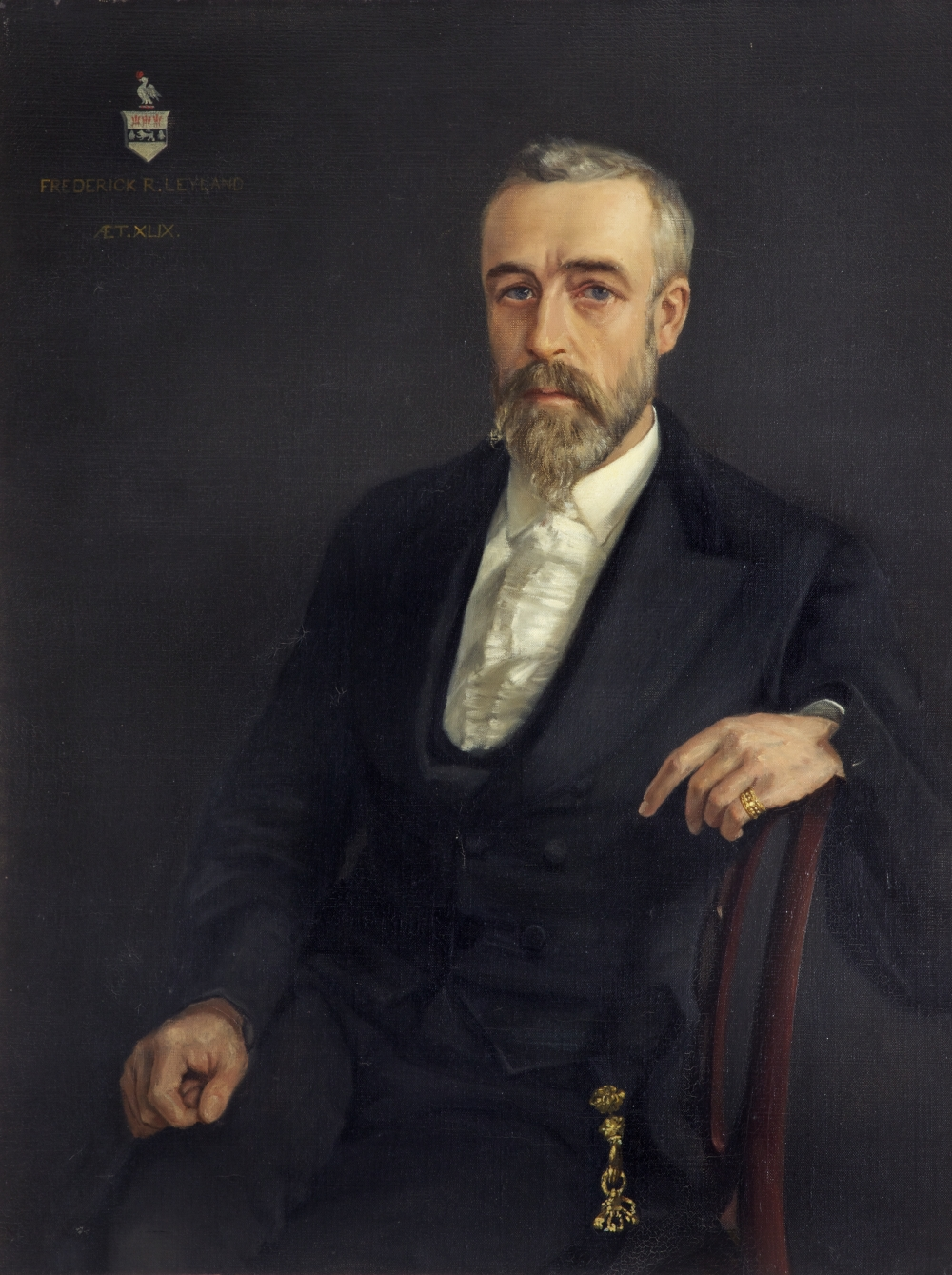
Frederick Leyland – Rosa Corder (1853–1893)

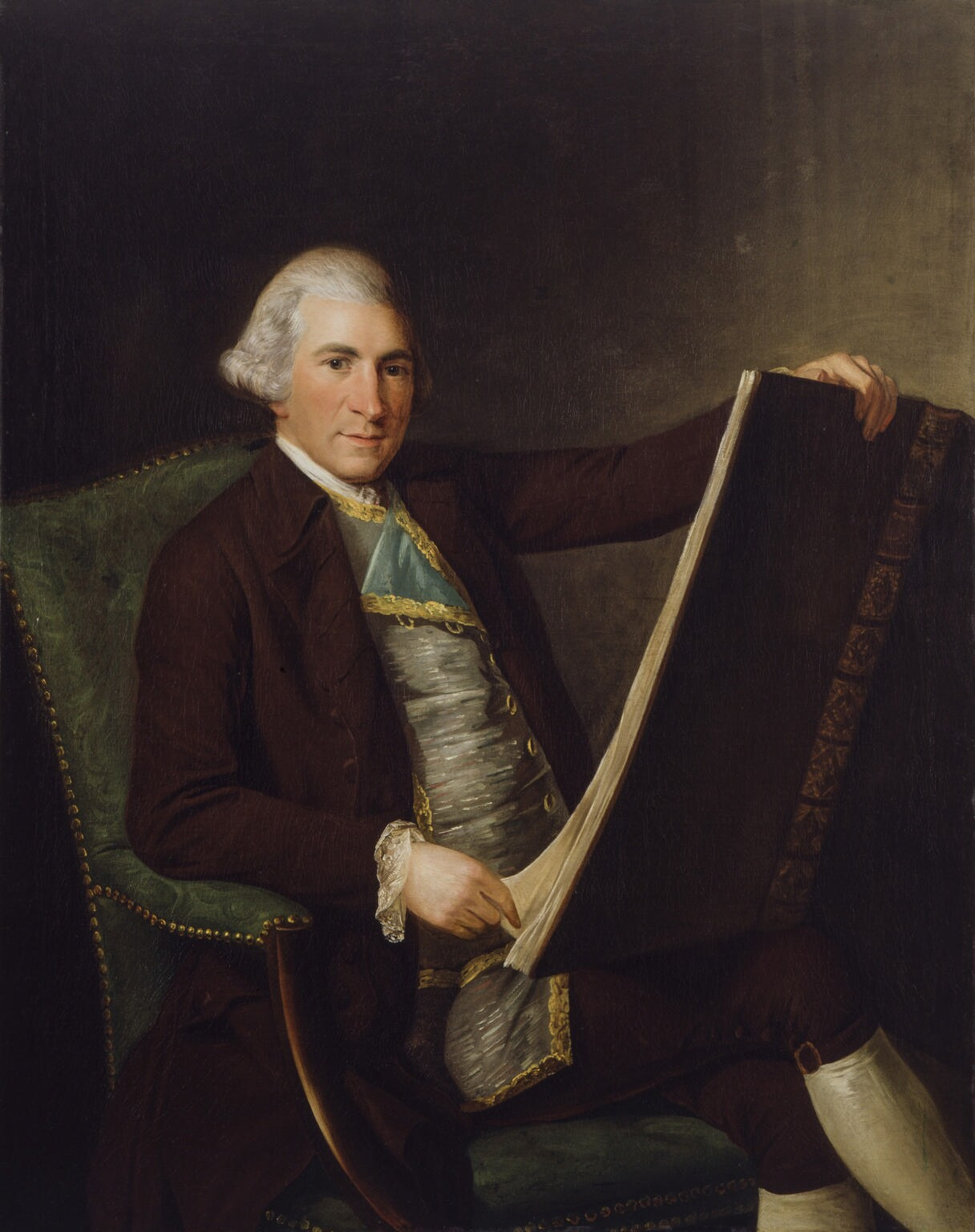
Architect, Robert Adam

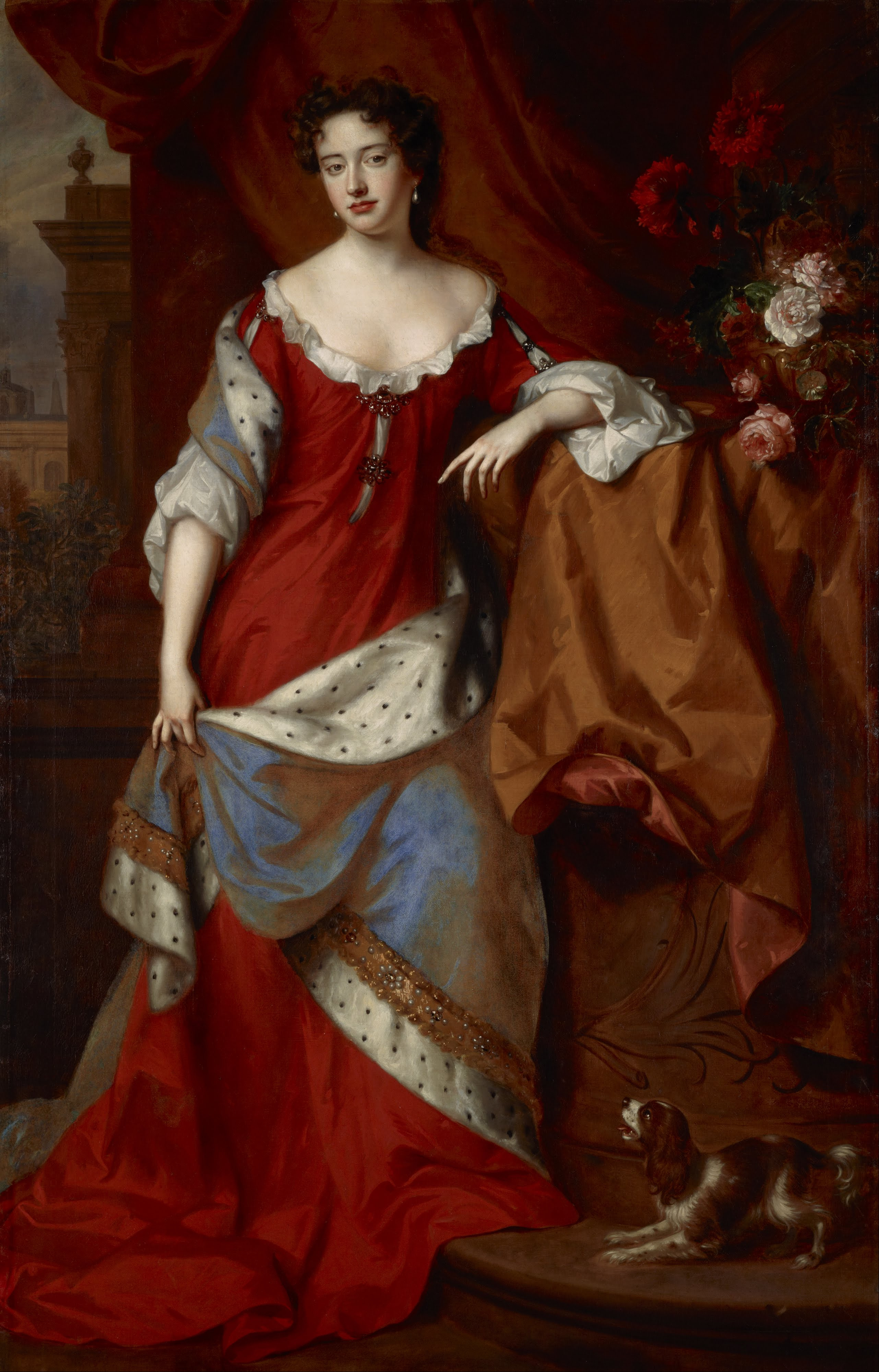
Queen Anne

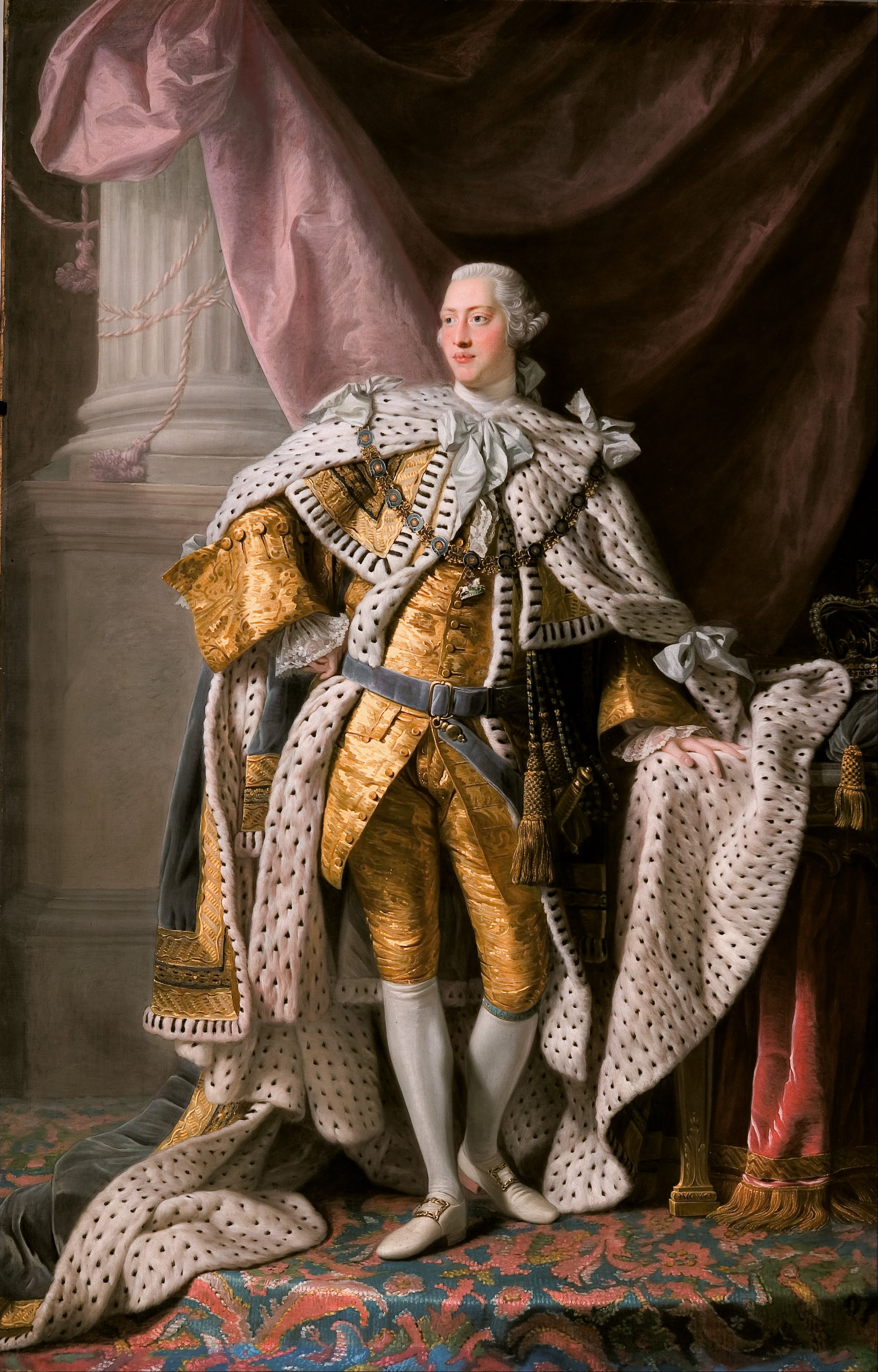
King George III

== Grounds ==
Most of the grounds were sold to Liverpool Corporation in 1920 by Colonel James P. Reynolds; of this land, Woolton Woods was dedicated for use as a public park and is now part of Woolton Woods and Camphill. An 18th-century gateway to the hall grounds and two lodges, the predominantly 19th-century Woolton Hall Lodge on Speke Road and the mid-19th-century Woodleigh Lodge on Woolton High Street, were all Grade II listed on 14 March 1975.

== See also ==
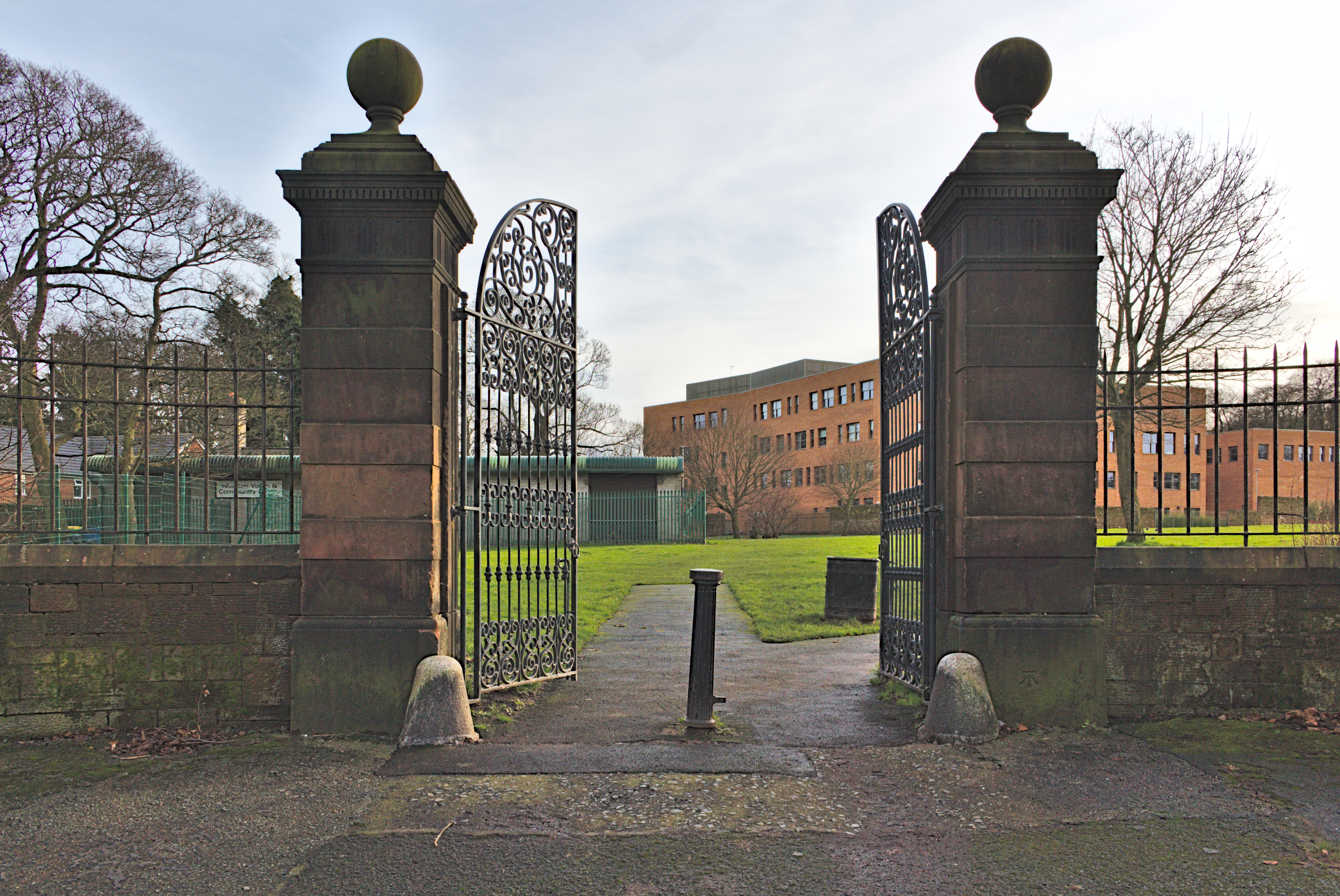
18th-century gateway to the hall park

- Architecture of Liverpool
- Grade I listed buildings in Liverpool

Other Grade II* or above listed buildings in Woolton:

- Cedarwood
- Much Woolton Old School
- St. Peter's Church, Woolton
