= Greenbank Drive Synagogue =

Former Orthodox synagogue in Liverpool, England

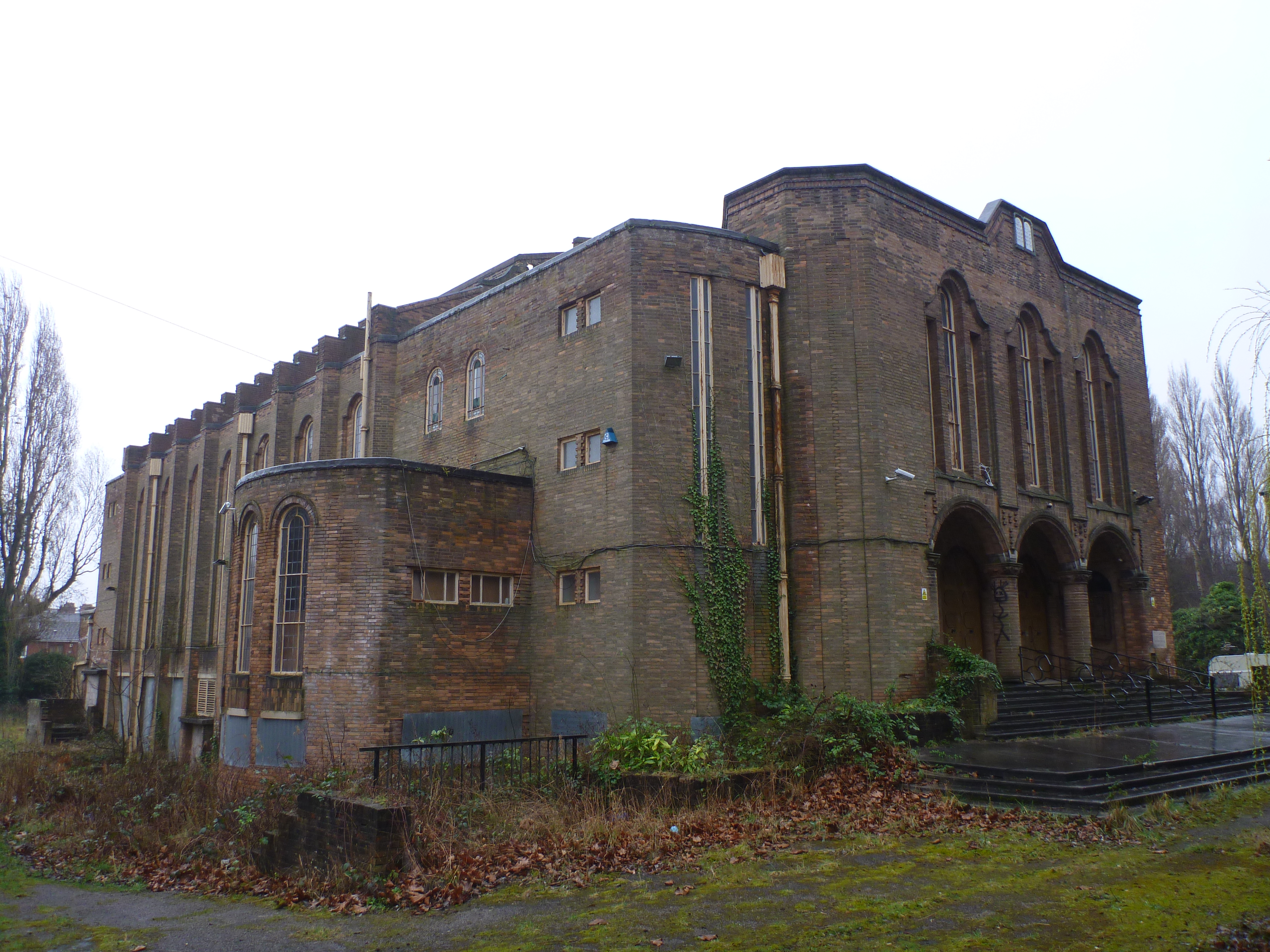
- Exterior of the former synagogue in 2019

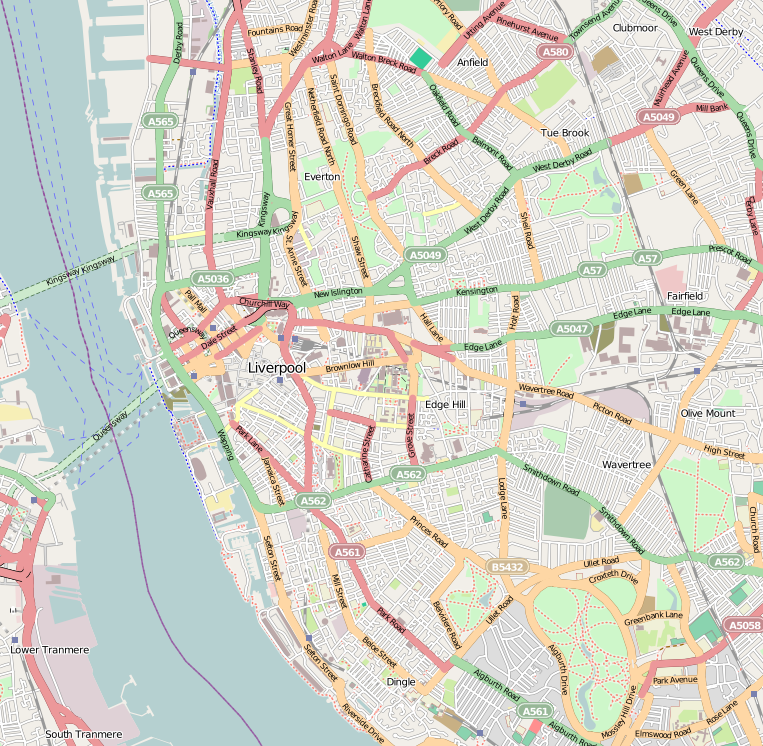
- Location of the former synagogue in Liverpool

Religion
- Affiliation: Orthodox Judaism (former)
- Rite: Nusach Ashkenaz
- Ecclesiastical or organizational status: Synagogue (1936–2008)
- Status: Closed (2008)

Location
- Location: Greenbank Drive, Sefton Park, Liverpool, England
- Country: United Kingdom
- Interactive map of Greenbank Drive Synagogue
- Coordinates: 53°23′22″N 2°55′45″W

Architecture
- Type: Synagogue architecture
- Style: Art Deco
- Established: 1936 (merged congregation): 1838 (Hope Place); unknown (Sefton Park)
- Completed: 1937

Listed Building – Grade II*
- Official name: Greenbank Drive Synagogue
- Designated: 11 May 1983
- Reference no.: 1298791

Greenbank Drive Synagogue, officially the Liverpool New Hebrew Congregation, is a former Orthodox Jewish congregation and synagogue that was located on Greenbank Drive, in the Sefton Park area of Liverpool, England. The congregation, formed through a merger of two congregations that date from 1838, worshiped in the Ashkenazi rite.

The former synagogue building was completed in 1937 and was Grade II* listed in 1983. The building has been described as the most important 20th-century synagogue in England in terms of architecture, as well as the finest surviving architectural example of a synagogue from the interwar period.

== History ==
Pretext for the foundation of the synagogue can be traced back to a split within the Liverpool Hebrew Congregation in 1838. From this, the separate New Hebrew Congregation established its own synagogue, first on Hanover Street, then on Pilgrim Street, before finally constructing a purpose-built synagogue on Hope Place in 1857.

After World War I, the number of Jewish congregants living close to the synagogue began to decline as they moved outwards to live in Liverpool's wealthier suburbs. One such area was around Sefton Park, where Hebrew schools and a substantial Jewish congregation started to take shape. By 1928, the Hope Place Congregation made plans to relocate and build a larger synagogue to accommodate the growing community in Sefton Park. On 15 August 1937, the new synagogue, which had been built in the Art Deco style, was consecrated and opened to the public by Professor Henry Cohen, 1st Baron Cohen of Birkenhead, a member of the congregation.

In May 1959, a fire was started by a burglar which destroyed the Torah ark and its scrolls and damaged part of the roof's structure. At a cost of £50,000, the building was repaired and later re-consecrated in 1961. Another fire broke out in 1965, this time on the first two floors, but the damage was confined to the area.

On 5 January 2008, the building ceased activity and was closed. Around the same time, Historic England upgraded the building's listed status from Grade II (awarded in 1983) to the higher Grade II*. It was subsequently placed on Historic England's "Heritage at Risk" register. In 2017 approval was given for the former synagogue to be renovated into a series of apartments.

== See also ==
- Grade II* listed buildings in Liverpool – Suburbs
- History of the Jews in England
- List of former synagogues in the United Kingdom
