= Much Woolton Old School =

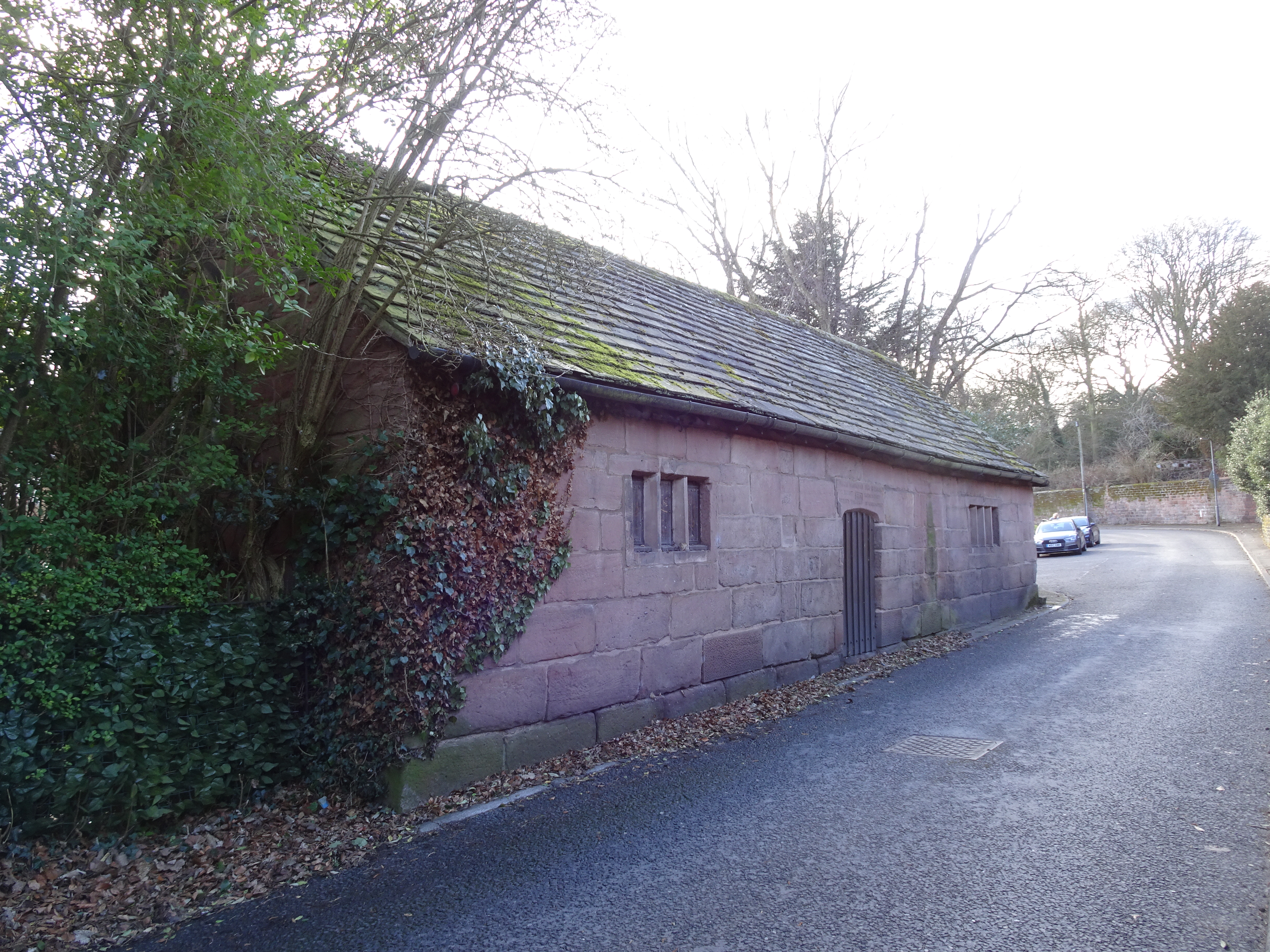
- As seen looking west on School Lane

- Location within Merseyside
- 53.3699°N 2.8663°W
- Type: Historic building
- Location: School Lane, Woolton, Liverpool, United Kingdom

History
- Built: c. 1610
- Original use: School

Site notes
- Current use: Nursery

Listed Building – Grade II*
- Designated: 28 June 1952
- Reference no.: 1361673

Much Woolton Old School is a small Grade II* listed building on School Lane in Woolton, Liverpool, United Kingdom.

An inscription on the building's exterior claims it to be the "oldest elementary school building in Lancashire" and built in 1610, though the date of construction has not been independently verified. It ceased to be used as a school in the mid 19th century. Since 1990, the building has been used as a nursery.

== History ==
=== Date of construction ===
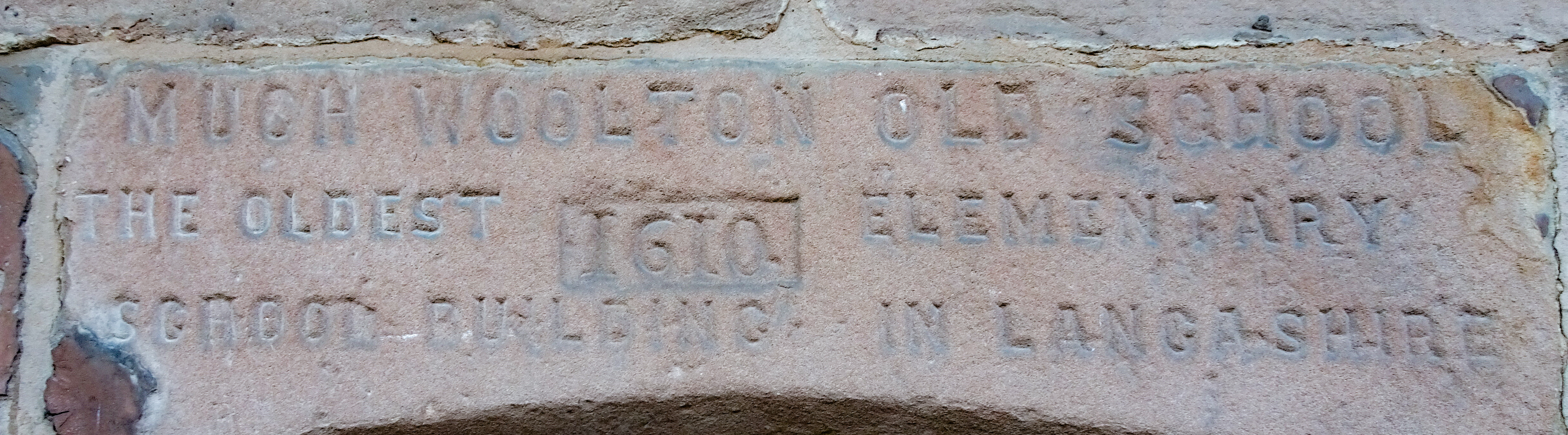
The inscription above the main door

Externally, on the lintel above the building's main door, is a stone inscription which reads, "Much Woolton Old School, the oldest [1610] elementary school building in Lancashire". Much doubt has been cast on this date being the exact year of construction – it may have been built earlier or later than what the engraving suggests. The statement was not inscribed until ~1925 under the instruction of the local rector, George Howson. Sources assert that whilst the "161" was original, he had the "0" added "arbitrarily" when the inscription was made.

The Victoria County History entry for Much Woolton states, "A grammar school now abandoned was in existence in the 16th century." Evidence exists of a building used for education in the area as early as 1575. At trial, shortly before his execution, Saint John Almond attested to having attended a Catholic school in Much Woolton around 1580. It is also noted the Childwall Parish Registers of 1597–98 were authored by a local "schoolmaster", and in 1606, an endowment of £60 was made by a local aristocrat to fund a schoolmaster in Woolton. These records have all been used by different authors to suggest they may be evidence that the Old School existed before the inscribed date. However, none of these incidences actually identify this specific building, just the area of Woolton.

It is also claimed that the building's Gothic windows are abnormal for a build allegedly of 1610, indicating an actual construction date "much earlier" than that.

Surviving financial records confirm the school (at least as an organisation) was in operation by 1625. However, the first known record to explicitly talk of the building itself does not appear until 1641; it states that "it is well knowne the [school]house was built at a common charge" but omits the year of erection. It was the only school for the entire parish of Childwall at the time.

=== Abandonment ===
The Old School remained the only school building in Woolton for 200 years. Around 1819, the Old School came into the possession of the Anglican National Society for the Education of the Poor and it was decided a new schoolhouse should be constructed. In 1823, a new school was completed on common land opposite St Peter's Church in the village centre. At the time, local girls had no exclusive school building – those receiving an education were doing so in an auxiliary space of the village workhouse, located adjacent to the site. Hence, the girls were moved into the dedicated new build; boys continued to be taught in the Old School, of which there were 85 pupils at the time.

Provisions for "enlargements" of the new school began to be made in 1831. Eventually, a second new schoolhouse was realised nearby in 1848. The girls moved into this new building, and the boys moved out of the Old School and into the schoolhouse the girls had just made vacant. Thus, the Old School was abandoned. In 1860, it was sold for £299. Afterwards, the building was at a time used to house animals and as a council potting shed.

=== 20th and 21st centuries ===
The Old School was almost demolished by the City Council in 1923. They felt it was necessary to remove the derelict building to successfully widen the road. However, local residents were able to convince the authorities of the building's heritage and saved it from destruction. In 1952, its historic relevance was formally recognised by Historic England, which listed the building at Grade II* level.

In the 1970s, the idea of converting the building into a museum was touted. It was eventually renovated as a house in 1984. Subsequently, it was renovated again as a nursery, which began operating in 1990, returning it to its original purpose as a place of education for the first time in ~150 years.

In 2022, a blue plaque was installed on the building's front façade in commemoration of its significance as a local heritage landmark.

== Architecture ==
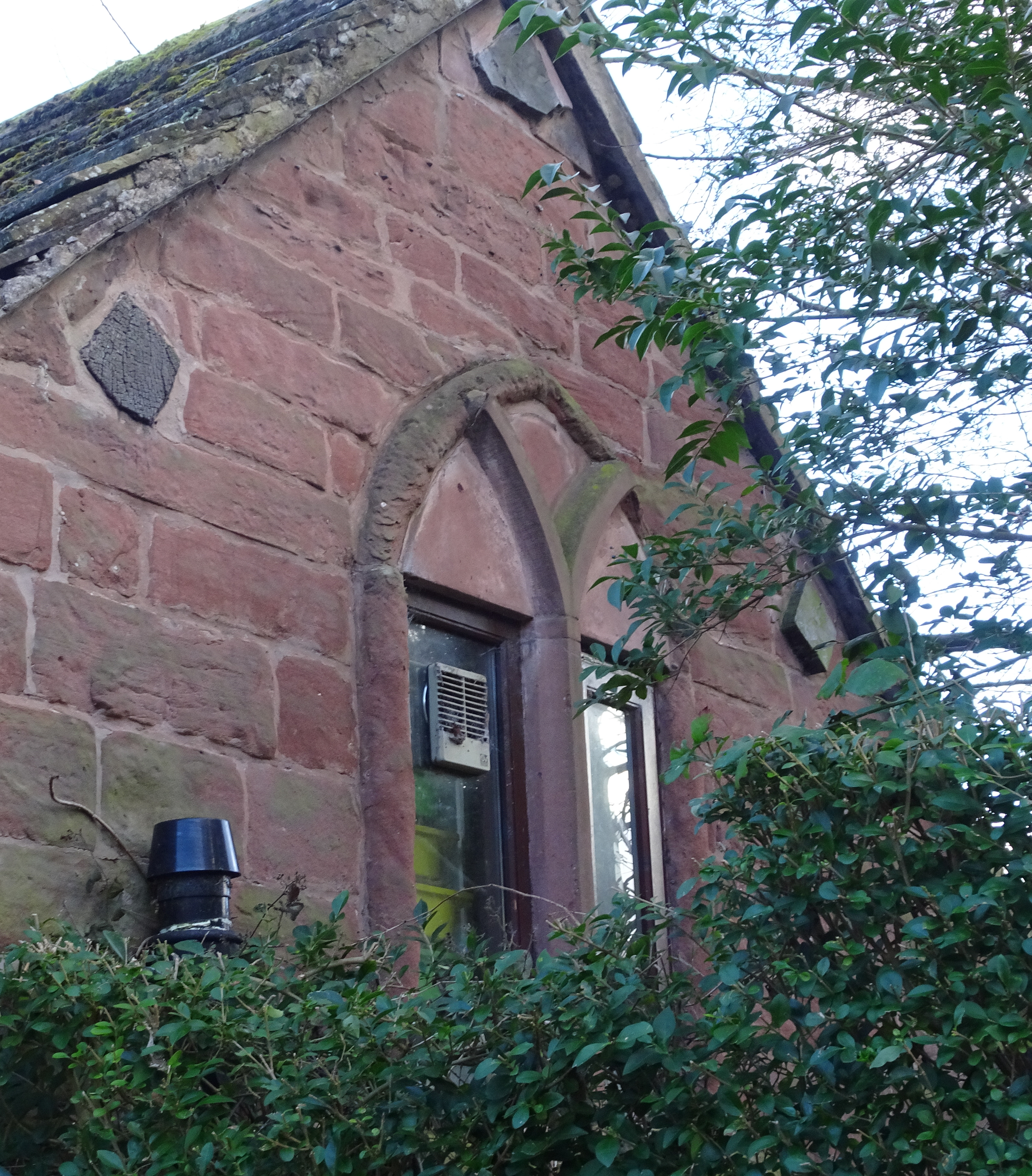
The Gothic window on the west elevation, designed with Y-tracery.

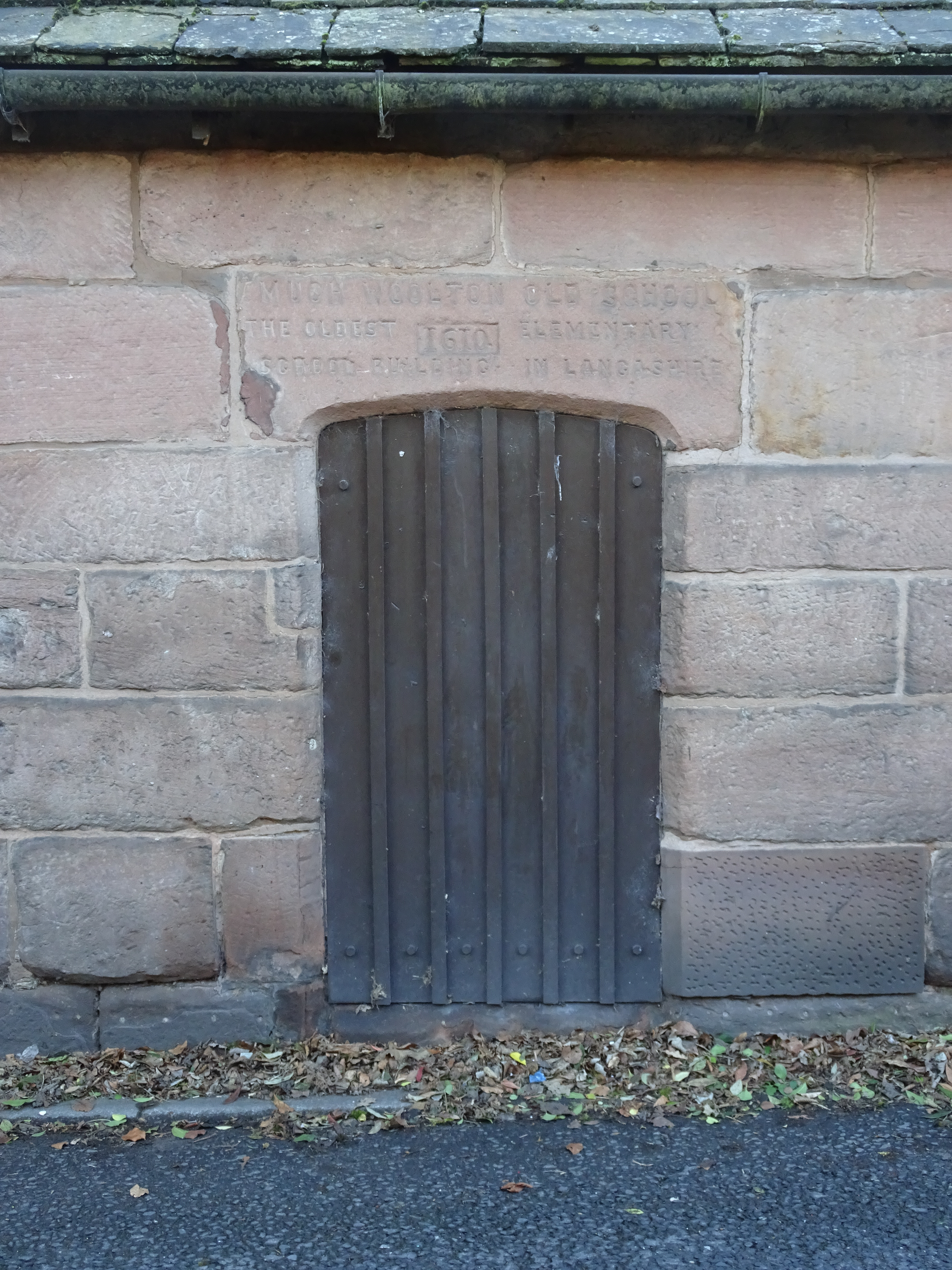
The restored main doorway, featuring a Tudor arch, is topped by engraved lintel.

The building is made from local sandstone topped with a slate roof. There are Gothic windows at each gable end, suggested to be an "unlikely feature" of a supposed post-reformation school, and it also features a Tudor arched entranceway. Small, mullioned windows were added to the front façade during the restorations of the late 20th century.

It has been described as "structurally unusual" compared to other schoolhouses of the time. The walls consist of just one leaf, half the expected thickness. Many of the bricks are very long (some over four feet) and very heavy, needing lifting gear to manoeuvre. Other similar schools were made with bricks easily manhandled.

== See also ==
Other Grade II* or above listed buildings in Woolton:

- Cedarwood
- St Peter's Church
- Woolton Hall
