= Cedarwood (house) =

Listed building in Woolton, Liverpool, England

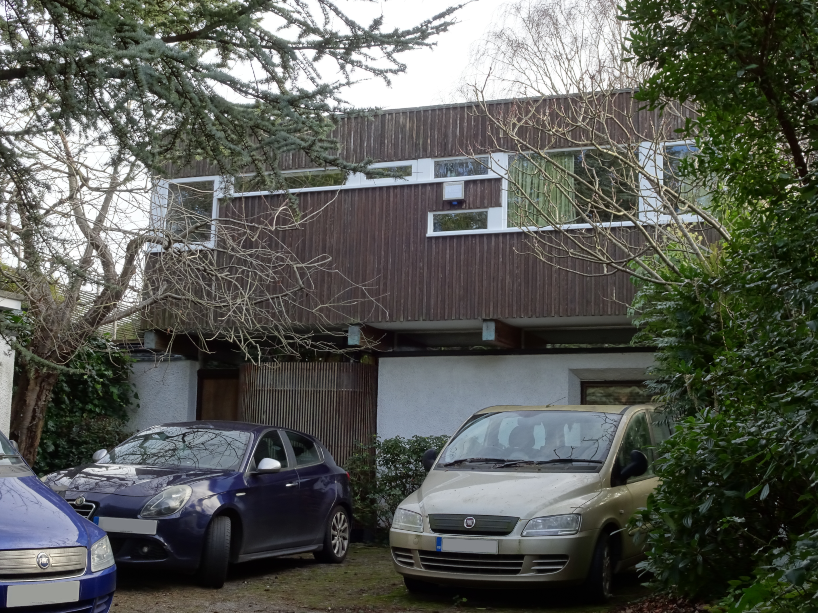
- Cedarwood in 2022

General information
- Address: Beaconsfield Road, Woolton, Liverpool, England
- Coordinates: 53°22′54″N 2°52′39″W
- Year(s) built: 1959–60

Design and construction
- Architect(s): Gerald Beech; Dewi Prys Thomas
- Designations

Listed Building – Grade II*
- Official name: Cedarwood
- Designated: 25 April 2007
- Reference no.: 1391948

Cedarwood is a Grade II* listed house on Beaconsfield Road in Woolton, Liverpool, England. It is most famous for being Woman's Journal's 'House of the Year' for 1960. Designed by Beech and Prys Thomas, its "outstanding design, excellent detailing and remarkable preservation" led to it becoming a listed building by Historic England in 2007.

== Description ==
A design by University of Liverpool based architects Gerald Beech and Dewi Prys Thomas was chosen by the magazine Woman's Journal as its 'House of the Year' scheme for 1960. The publication paid for the house to be built in the Liverpool suburb of Woolton and recovered the costs through sponsorships from constructors and suppliers involved. Its estimated value was around £10,000, albeit without its luxurious fixtures and fittings could be marketed around £4,000. Upon completion it was opened up to viewing for the general public for four weeks between 25 February and 27 March 1960, during which time it became a local attraction and was visited by tens of thousands of people.

It was envisioned as a house of the future which could be mass-produced, suited for the modern family lifestyle emerging in Britain at the dawn of the 1960s. Ultimately, however, it was never replicated and thus remains a one-off architectural expression of that time period, also experiencing minimal alterations since.

The house is a two-storey building. The ground floor spans the width of the site and is constructed of brick, finished with a white cement render. It is mostly open plan, however the living spaces and dining room can be divided with folding screens. The kitchen and cloakroom form the main traditionally partitioned spaces on the ground floor; the latter's curved cedarwood frame protrudes outside of the front elevation. Large windows look out onto the back garden.

The first floor is a significant contrast. It is narrower than the ground floor, but cantilevers slightly over the front and back façades. It is constructed of Western Hemlock timber, balloon framed, supported upon four Douglas Fir glulam crossbeams that rest on the tops of the walls of the ground floor and run from the front to the back of the house. One of these beams is not original and was replaced in the 1990s. The gap between the floors created by the crossbeams is sealed with glass, allowing natural light to filter through to the ground floor. The first floor exterior is clad in Canadian Western Redcedar, from which the building gets its name. It features four traditionally compartmentalised bedrooms, a bathroom, and an external terrace. The roof is pyramidal in form and shallow in pitch, so much so that it is virtually completely hidden from view by a copper clad parapet.

The rear garden was also designed by the architects. It features a small pool, placed close to the house to reflect light into it, artificially sculpted grassy mounds, and birch trees.

The building is particularly noted for its detailing. Examples include: stiletto heel coat hooks in the cloakroom, slots for a telephone, directory and coal scuttle in the built-in fire surround, dining room wall niches for wine bottles and concealed strip lights within the wooden pelmets of the bedrooms. The original furnishings were supplied by the Liverpool department store, George Henry Lee.

== See also ==
- Grade II* listed buildings in Liverpool – Suburbs
- Much Woolton Old School
- St. Peter's Church
- Woolton Hall
