= Gerald Beech =

English architect

Gerald Rushworth Beech (1921 – 2013) was an English architect.

Beech was born in 1921 in Congleton, Cheshire, and educated at the University of Liverpool School of Architecture starting in 1937, and was a staff member there from 1948 to the 1980s.

Beech also ran an architectural practice in Liverpool, Gerald Beech and Partners. He designed the Wyncote Sports Pavilion for the University of Liverpool's sports grounds in Allerton, which won the Civic Trust Award in 1964. Cedarwood, a house he designed with Dewi-Prys Thomas in the Liverpool suburb of Woolton, was named "House of the Year" in 1960 by Woman's Journal and was Grade II* listed in 2007. They also collaborated on a few other buildings, such as the modernist Quaker Meeting House, Heswall, opened 1963, where Beech also designed later modifications in the 1970s. In 1975 he was elected as chairman of the North West Regional Council of the Royal Institute of British Architects.

Beech died in 2013. The Gerald Beech Partnership Papers are held by the University of Liverpool Library.
