= Dewi-Prys Thomas =

Welsh architect (1916–1985)

- Born: 1916; Liverpool, England
- Died: 1985 (aged 68–69)
- Education: University of Liverpool
- Occupations: Architect, academic
- Known for: head of the Welsh School of Architecture

Dewi-Prys Thomas (1916–1985) was a Welsh architect and academic. He was the first professor of architecture at the University of Wales and was also the head of the Welsh School of Architecture, where he instituted a new Department of Town Planning.

== Life and career ==
Thomas was born to a Welsh family in Liverpool in 1916. Initially he wanted to become an artist, but was persuaded to study architecture by Lionel Bailey Budden. He graduated First Class Honours from the University of Liverpool in 1939, and then went to study town planning under William Holford.

He spent the next seven years working with various architects in Cardiff, including contributions to the Alwyn Lloyd and Herbert Jackson South Wales Outline Plan. In 1947 he returned to Liverpool to teach at the Liverpool School of Architecture, where he became a senior lecturer. During this time he also worked in a private architecture practice. His designs include Entwood (1958), a private house in Birkenhead that has received Grade II listing. Cedarwood, a house he designed with Gerald Beech in the Liverpool suburb of Woolton, was named "House of the Year" in 1960 by Woman's Journal.

He returned to Wales once again in 1960 to head the Welsh School of Architecture, where he would remain until his retirement in 1981. Further buildings that he designed included the modernist-style Quaker Meeting House, Heswall on the Wirral near Liverpool. This was another collaboration with Beech and opened in 1963.

After retirement as a teacher, Thomas returned to practical architecture once more, contributing to the design of Y Pencadlys (County Hall) in Caernarfon, the headquarters of Gwynedd County Council, executed by the Council's architects Merfyn Roberts and Terry Potter 1982–86.

Outside of his work, Thomas was also well known as an environmental campaigner, regularly petitioning on behalf of such organisations as Civic Trust for Wales and the Campaign for the Protection of Rural Wales. He also served as a commissioner on the Royal Commission on the Ancient and Historical Monuments of Wales, and a member of the Gorsedd of Bards.

== Legacy ==
The triennial Dewi-Prys Thomas Prize is awarded by the Royal Institute of British Architects, and "recognizes the importance of good design to the quality of life, identity and regeneration of Wales".

His papers are held by the National Library of Wales.
