= County Sessions House, Liverpool =

Listed building in Liverpool, England

County Sessions House
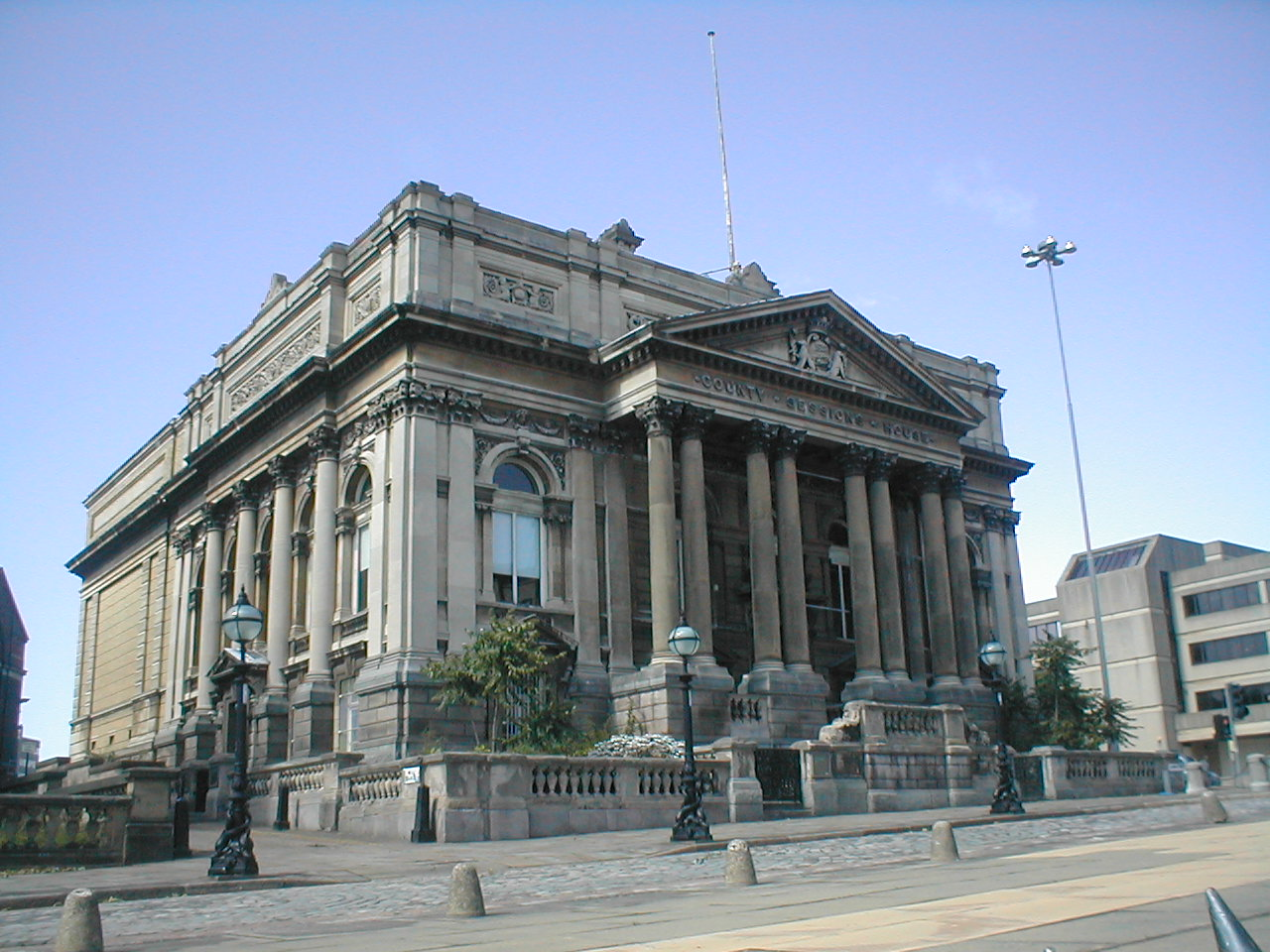
- County Sessions House

- Location within Liverpool

General information
- Architectural style: Neoclassical
- Location: William Brown Street, Liverpool, England
- Coordinates: 53°24′36.5″N 02°58′44.5″W
- Year built: 1882–84

Design and construction
- Architect: F & G Holme
- Designations

Listed Building – Grade II*
- Official name: Sessions House
- Designated: 14 March 1975
- Reference no.: 1063783

The County Sessions House is a former courthouse in Liverpool, England. It stands at the top of William Brown Street and is adjacent to the Walker Art Gallery, the Steble Fountain and Wellington's Column. It now provides office and storage space for the gallery. The Session House is recorded in the National Heritage List for England as a designated Grade II* listed building.

== History ==
The courthouse was commissioned to replace local judicial facilities at a courthouse in Basnett Street and at the Kirkdale Sessions House. Following the implementation of the Prison Act 1877, which transferred responsibility for Kirkdale Prison to the state, it became necessary to establish a new sessions house: the site selected was a row of residential properties to the east of the Walker Art Gallery.

The new building was designed by the Liverpool architects F & G Holme in the Neoclassical style and intended to accommodate the quarter sessions of the West Derby Hundred of the historic county of Lancashire: it was built between 1882 and 1884.

The building closed as a judicial facility in 1984 when the Crown Courts moved to Derby Square. It was then reopened as the Merseyside Museum of Labour History, an initiative sponsored by Merseyside County Council, in March 1986. After the Merseyside Museum of Labour History closed in November 1991, the building was used by the Walker Art Gallery for offices for staff and for storage.

== Architecture ==
The building is constructed in ashlar stone on a granite base. Although its appearance is Neoclassical, its style is described as being "late Victorian" and "derived from Renaissance Venice rather than ancient Greece and Rome". It is built in a single storey with a basement, and its front has five bays. The basement is rusticated. At its front is a portico with eight paired Corinthian order columns, above which is a frieze bearing the inscription "COUNTY SESSIONS HOUSE". The tympanum contains the arms of Lancashire County Council. The windows have round arches and are flanked by Ionic pilasters. At the sides, five bays have similar columns, beyond which the building is plainer, in yellow brick and stone. The interior is complex and richly decorated. It contains an Italian Renaissance staircase. Internally, the principal rooms are the two court rooms on the first floor (one door for the nisi prius court and one for the crown court) and the Grand Jury Room on the second floor. It also contains barristers' chambers and judge's chambers, cells, and facilities for administration on the ground floor.

== See also ==
- Architecture of Liverpool
- Grade II* listed buildings in Liverpool – City Centre
- Grade II* listed buildings in Merseyside
