= George Anderson Lawson =

British sculptor (1832–1904)

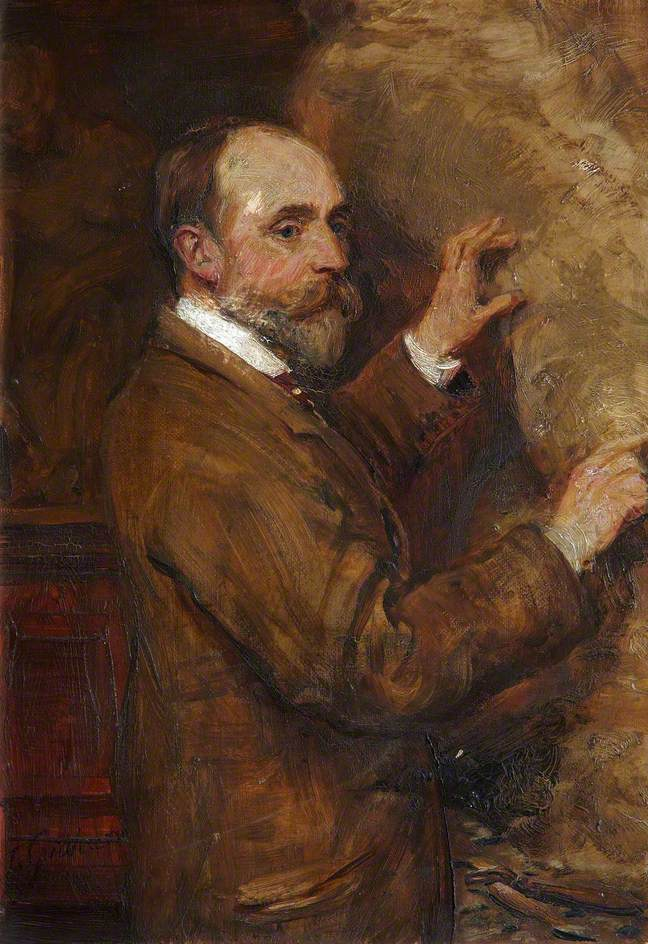
George Anderson Lawson (portrait by Thomas Alexander Ferguson Graham)

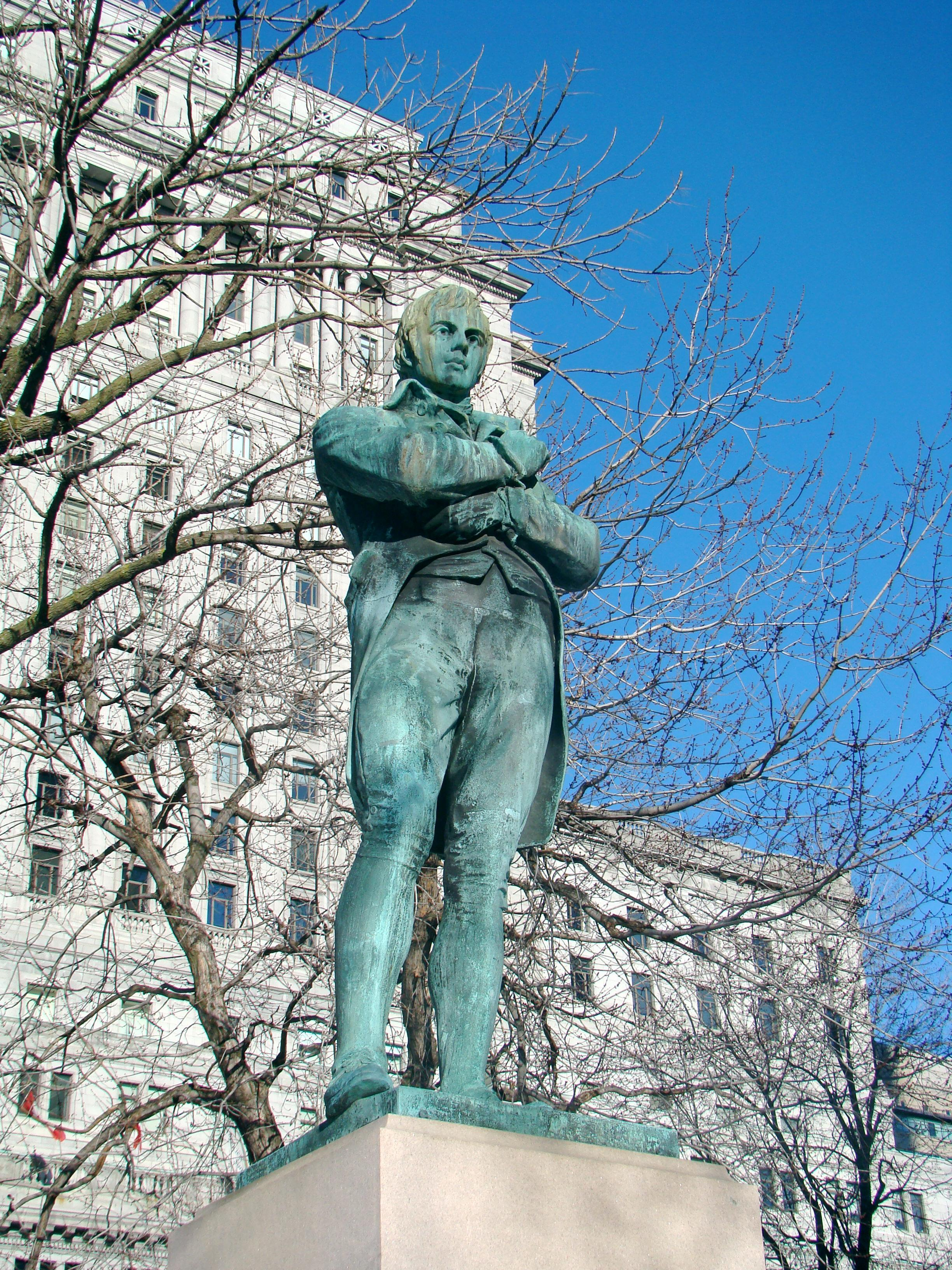
Burns memorial, Montreal

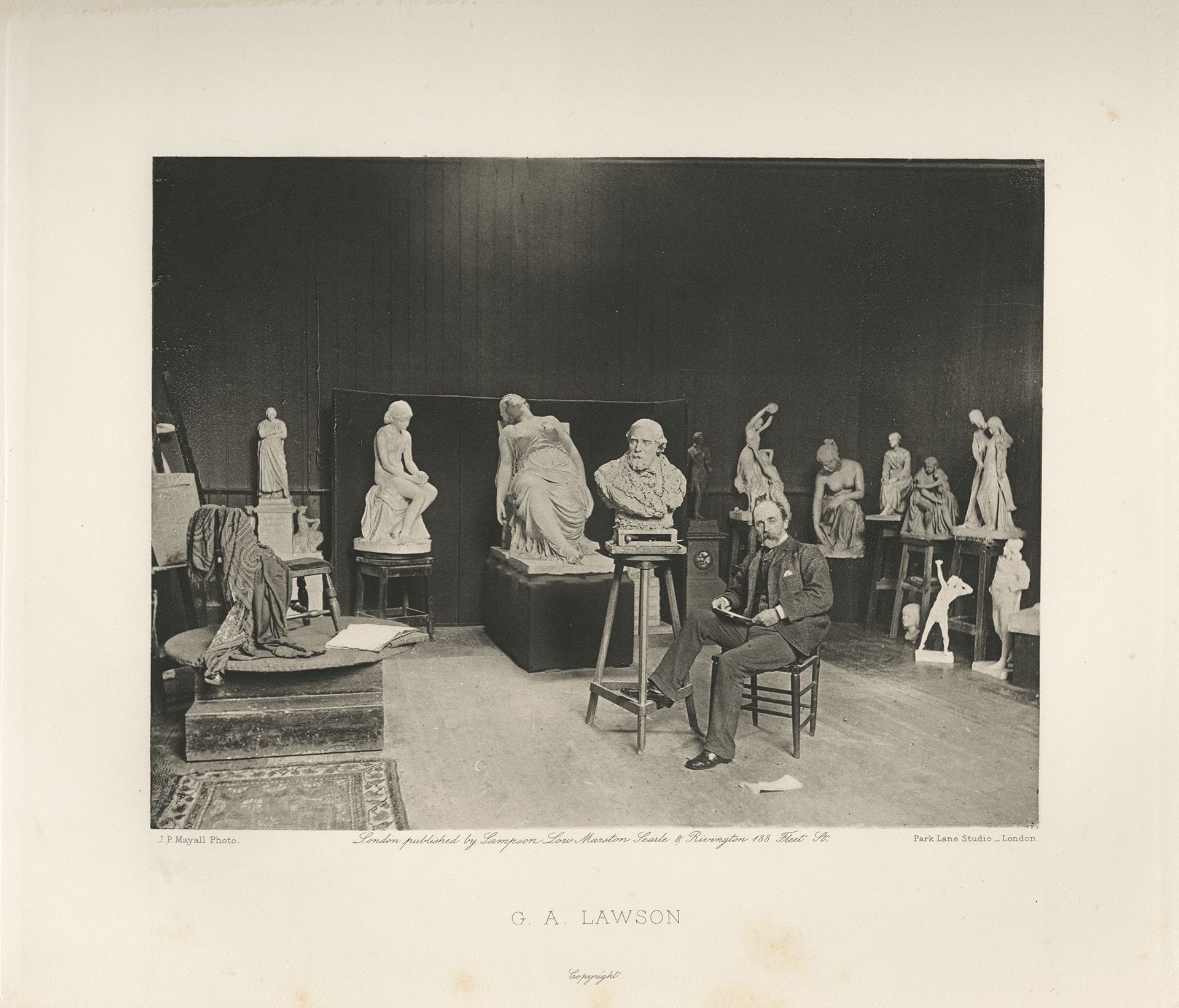
George Anderson Lawson by J. P. Mayall from Artists at Home, photogravure, published 1884, Department of Image Collections, National Gallery of Art Library, Washington, DC

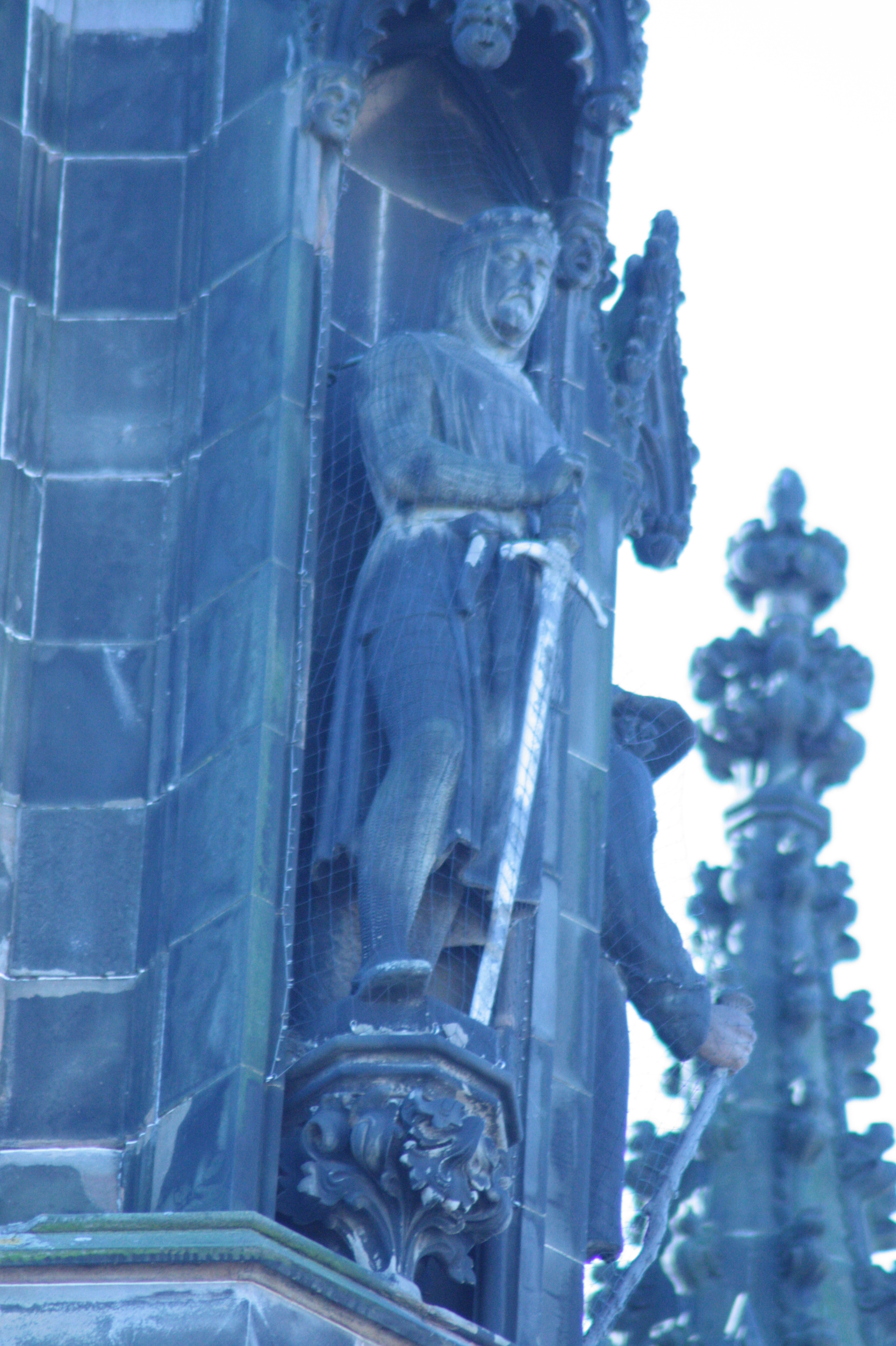
Robert the Bruce by George A Lawson, Scott Monument, Edinburgh

George Anderson Lawson (Edinburgh 1832 – 23 September 1904) was a British Victorian era sculptor who was associated with the New Sculpture movement.

== Life ==
He was born at Edinburgh in 1832, the son of David Lawson and Anne Campbell. He was educated at George Heriot's Hospital. He trained under Alexander Handyside Ritchie, and in the schools of the Royal Scottish Academy. Lawson travelled to study in Rome, becoming an admirer of John Gibson.

Back in England, he lived initially in Liverpool, making work in terracotta. His reputation was established through the creation of statues of distinguished citizens. His first major work was the statue of the Duke of Wellington at the top of Wellington's Column in the centre of Liverpool at the end of William Brown Street. He also created the relief sculpture depicting Wellington's major victory at Waterloo. The monument was completed "towards the end of 1865 when George Lawson's relief panel of the final battle at Waterloo was fixed in place on the pedestal". He moved to London in 1866.

He later created the memorial to Robert Burns in Ayr, inaugurated in 1892. Other versions were circulated to Dublin, Melbourne, Montreal, Winnipeg, Halifax and elsewhere. Other memorials include those to James Arthur (Glasgow), Joseph Pease (Darlington), John Vaughan (Middlesbrough) and John Biggs (Leicester). In New Zealand, he commemorated William Sefton Moorhouse in Christchurch.

He is also remembered for his classical friezes, especially reliefs for Glasgow City Chambers, George Square, and panels for the Municipal Buildings, Bath. The art critic Marion Spielmann described his work as "strong, manly and artistic".

Lawson was elected an Honorary Academician of the Royal Scottish Academy (HRSA) in 1884. He died at Richmond, Surrey, on 23 September 1904.

== Family ==
On 28 August 1862, he married Jane Frier of Edinburgh.

== Gallery ==
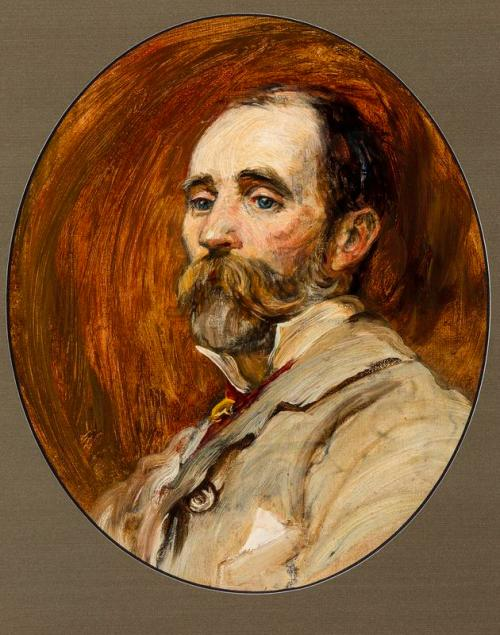
Portrait of George A. Lawson by Thomas Alexander Ferguson Graham (1882), Aberdeen Art Gallery

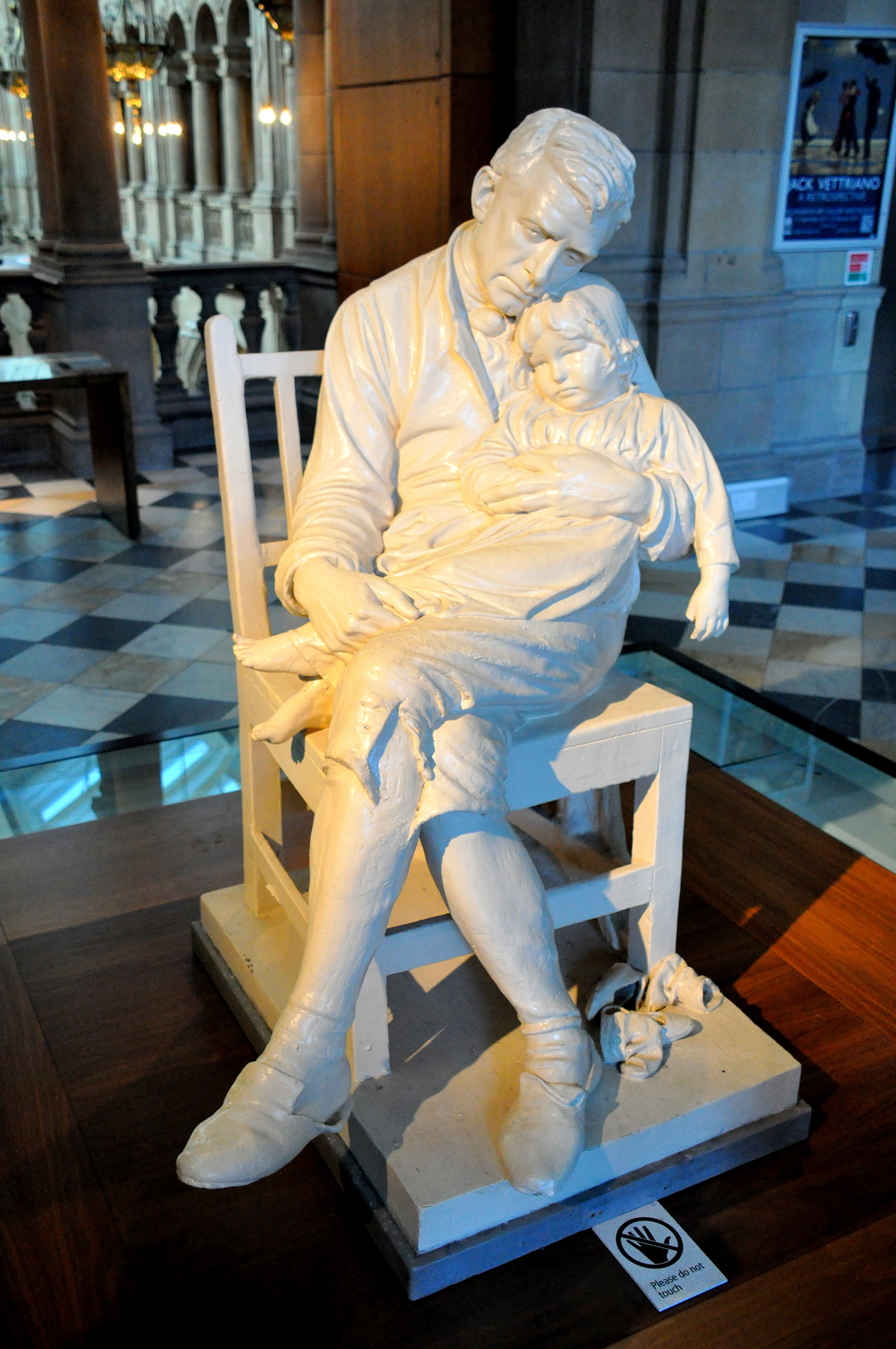
Motherless, a statue of a motherless girl and her father. George Anderson Lawson, 19th century. The Kelvingrove Art Gallery and Museum, Glasgow, UK

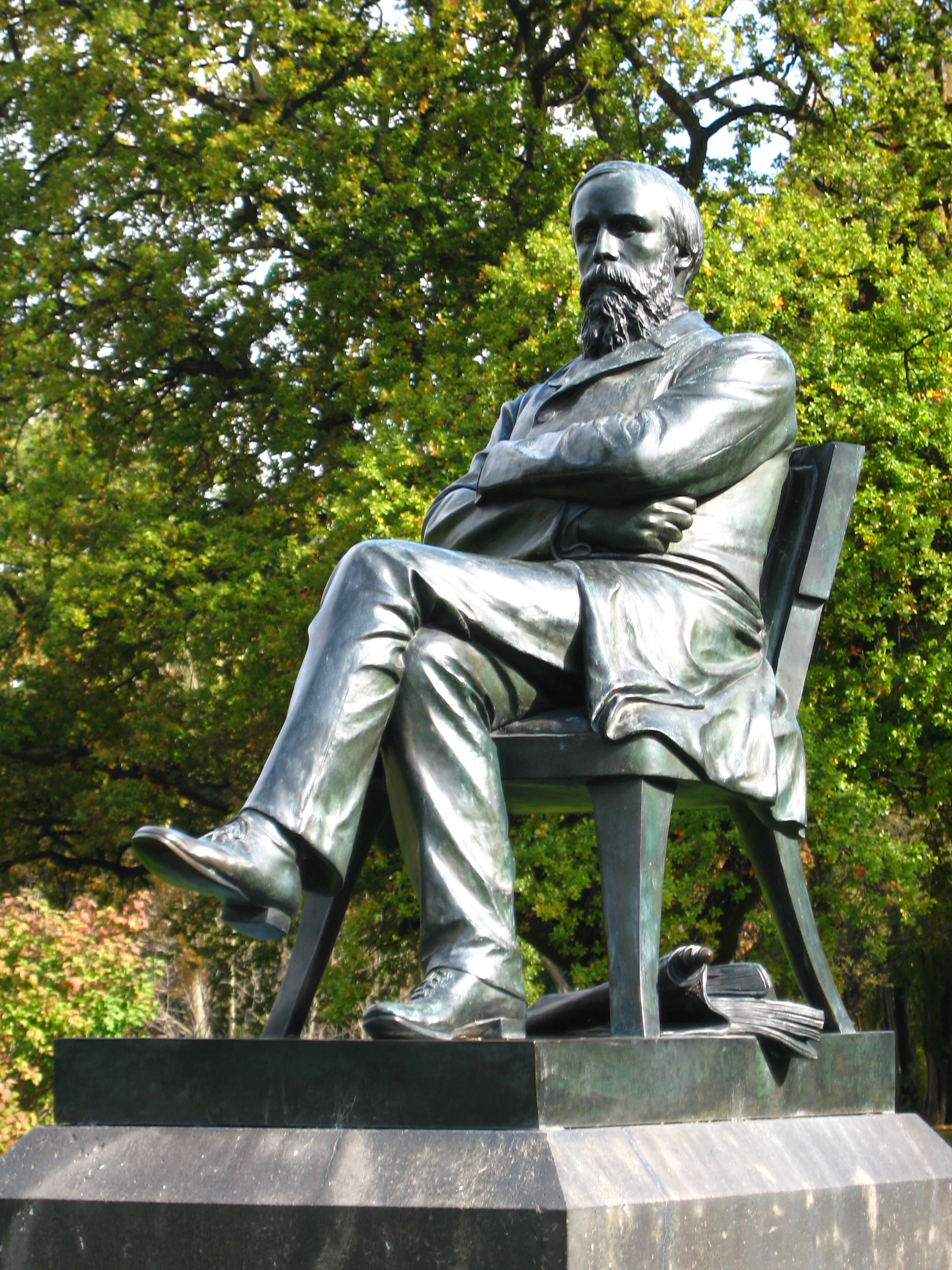
William Sefton Moorhouse

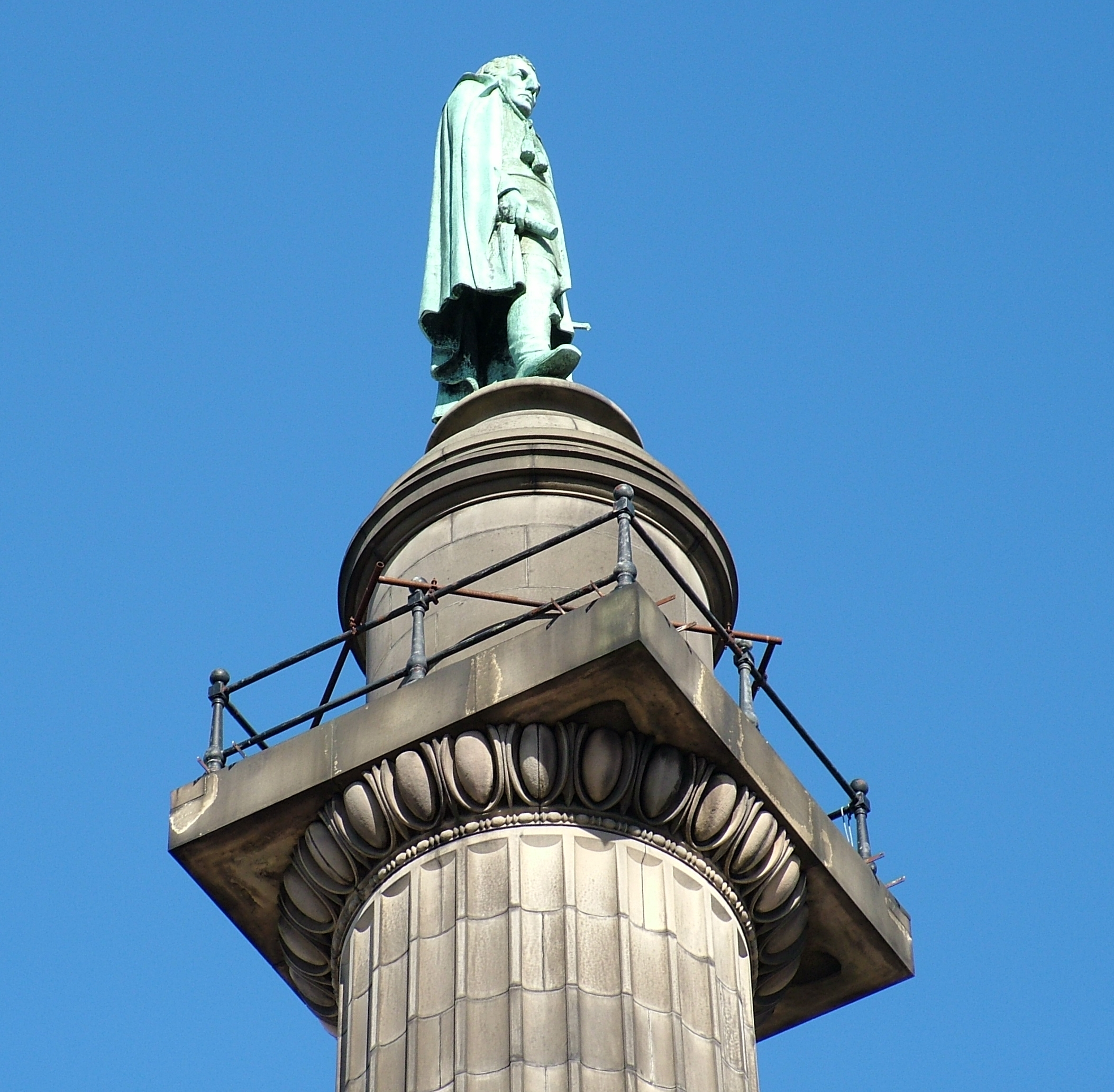
Wellington's Column, Liverpool

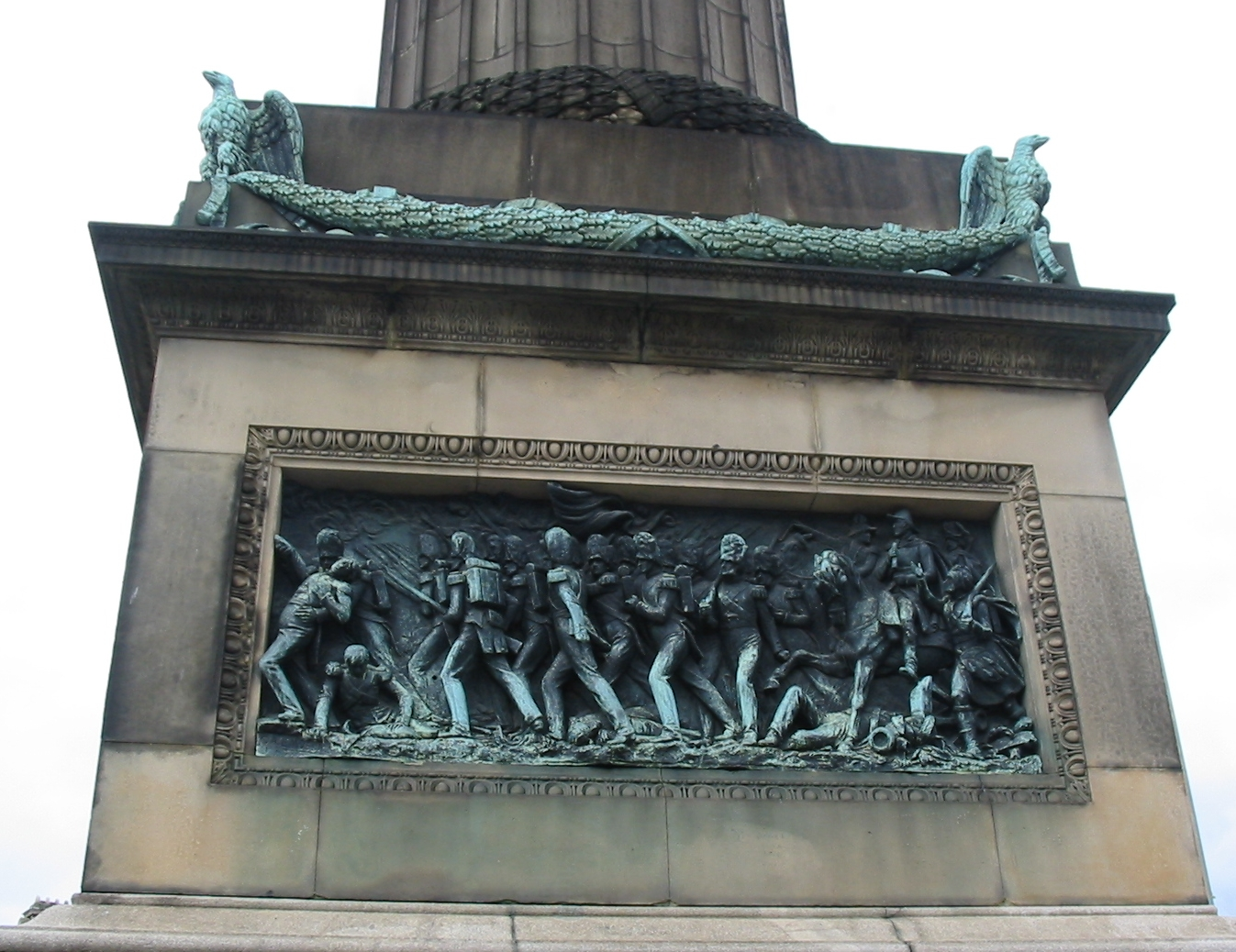
Relief on Wellington's Column

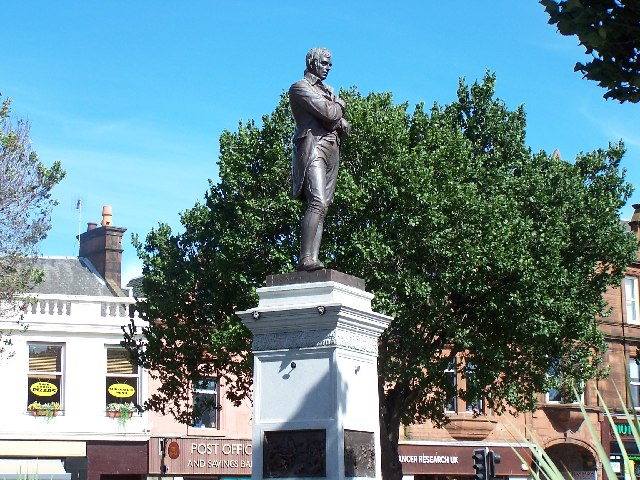
Burns, Ayr

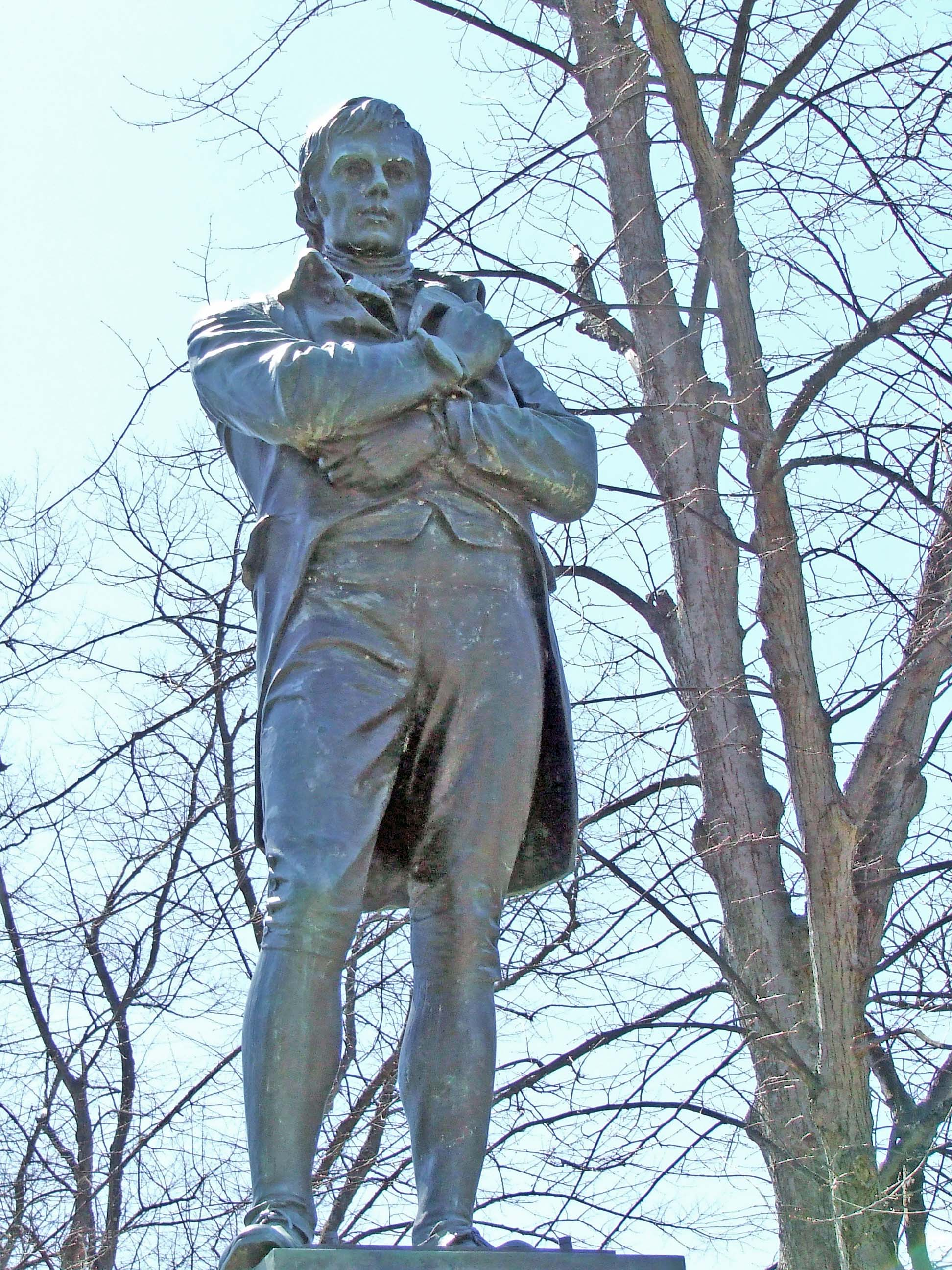
Burns statue in Victoria Park, Halifax, Nova Scotia

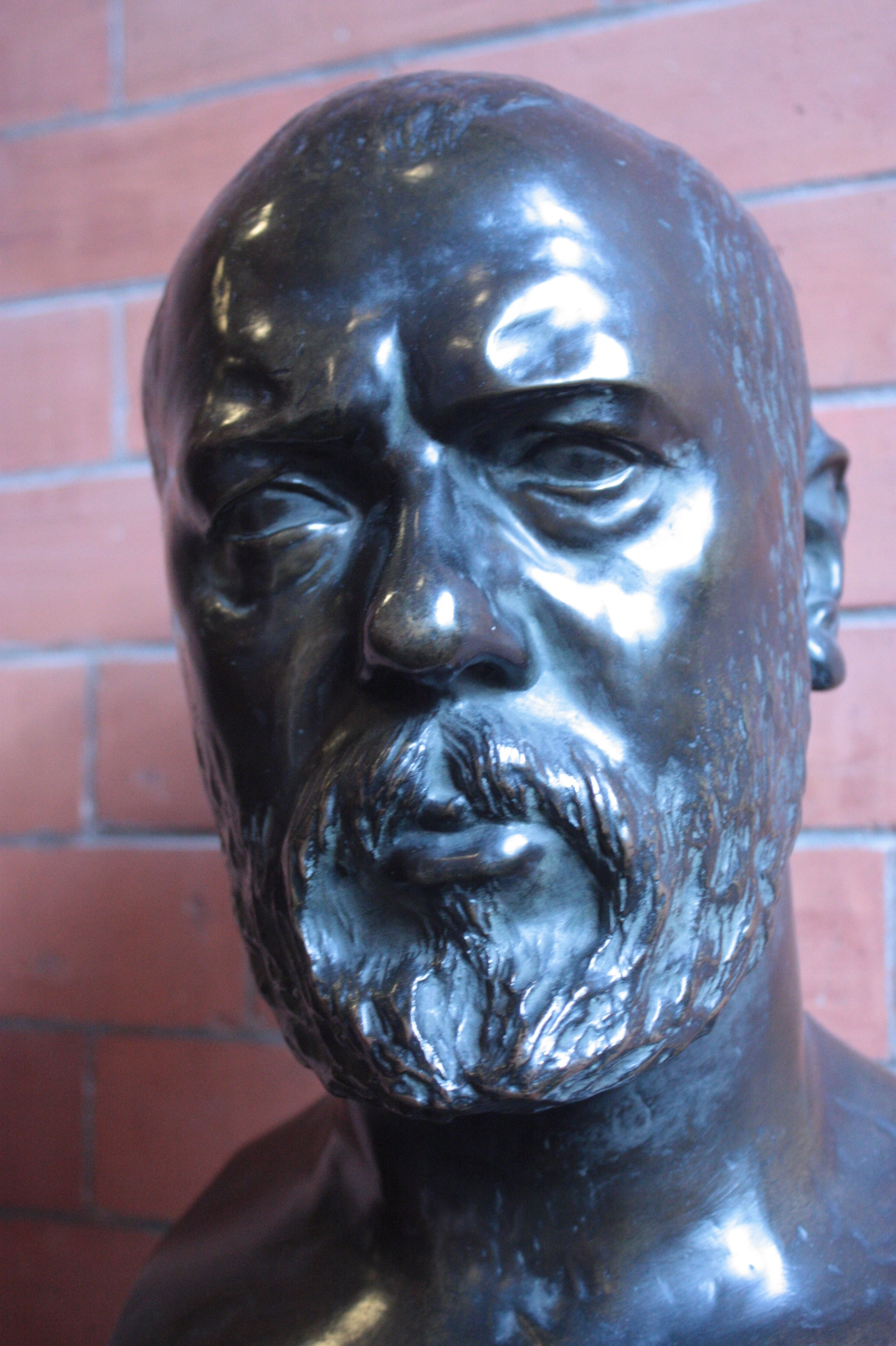
Portrait bust of John Pettie

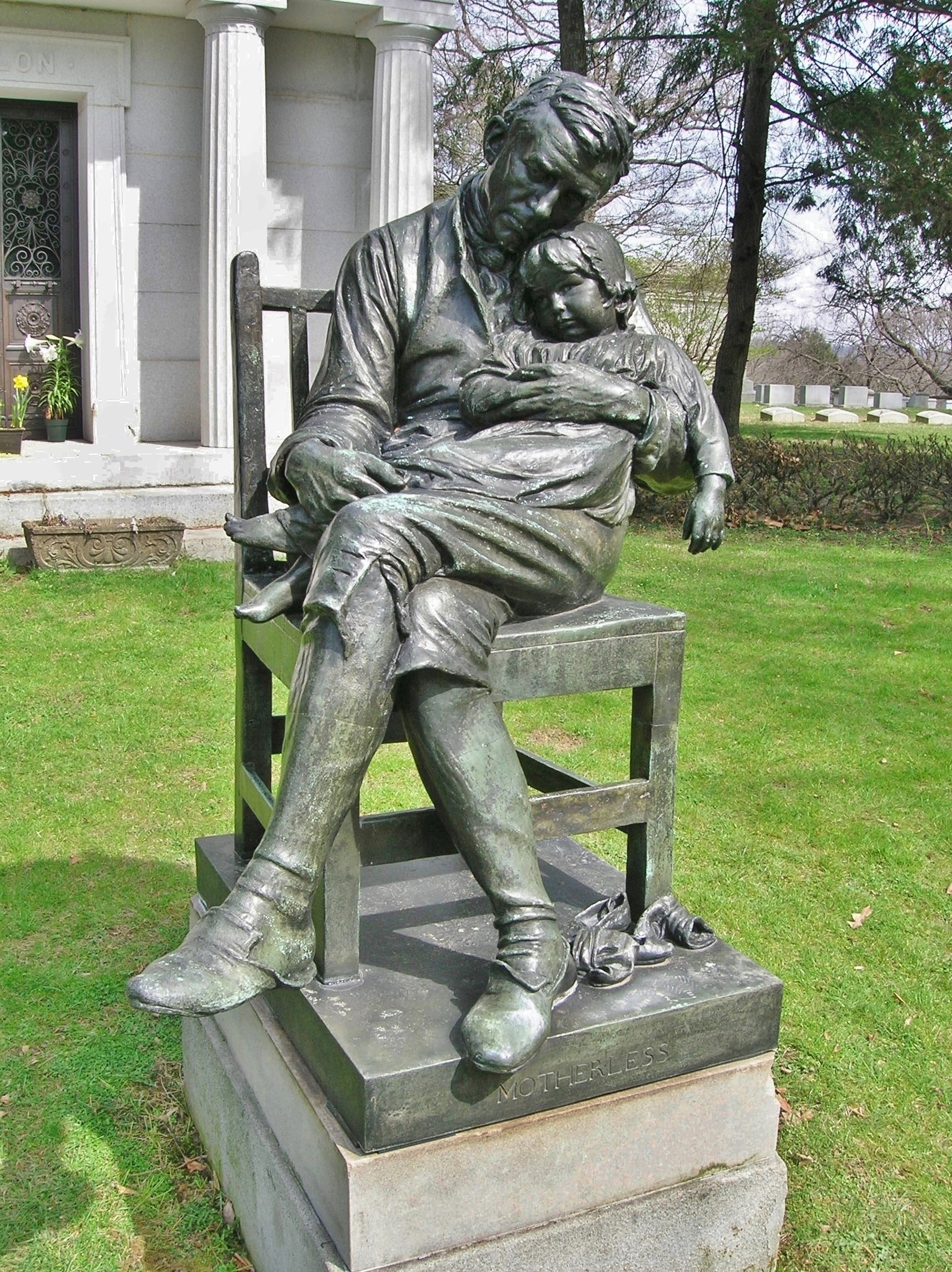
Motherless (1897), Homewood Cemetery, Pittsburgh, Pennsylvania
