= Steble Fountain =

Listed fountain in Liverpool, England

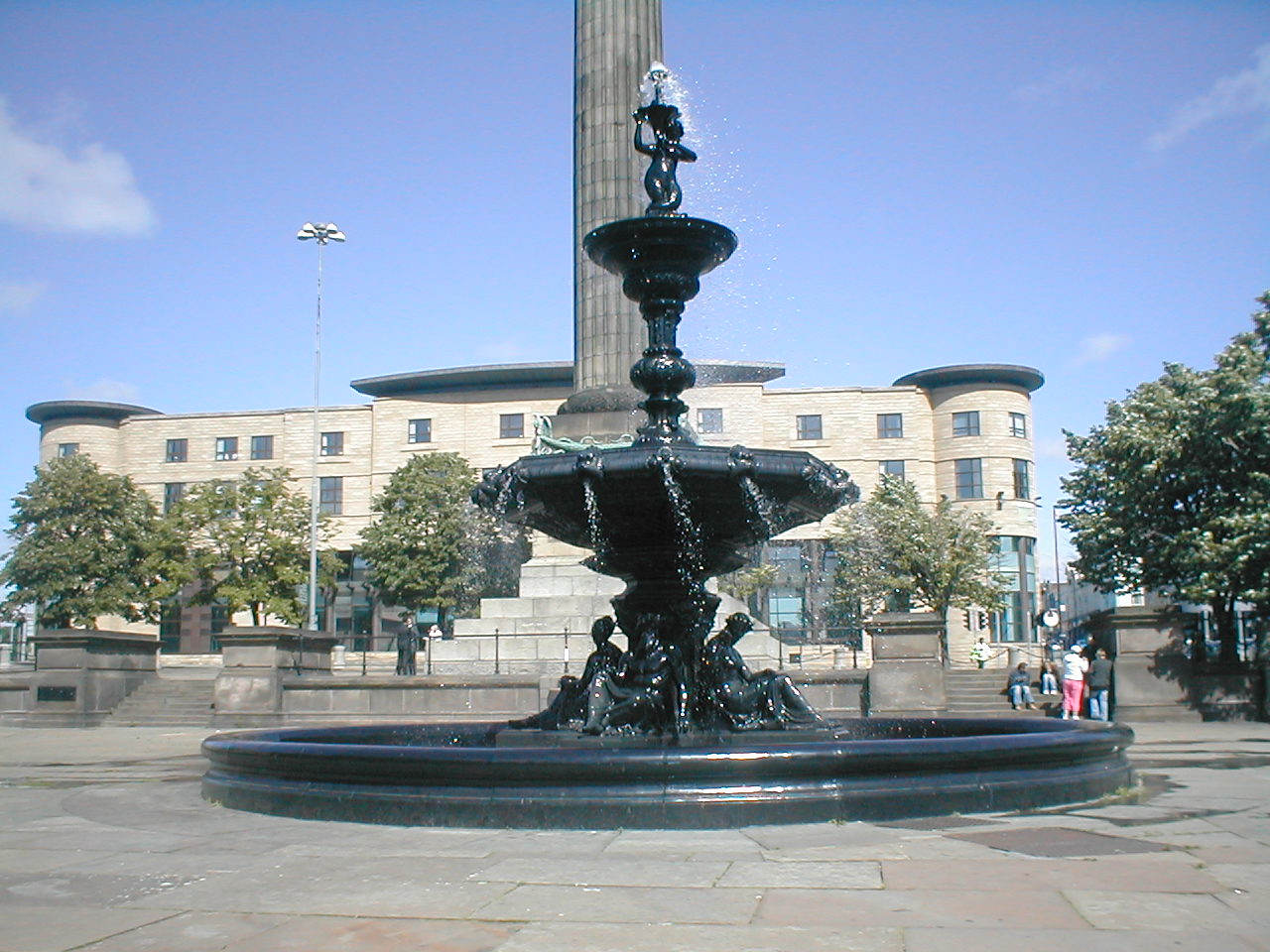
- Steble Fountain with Wellington's Column in the background

General information
- Location: William Brown Street, Liverpool, England
- Coordinates: 53.40956°N 2.97923°W
- Year(s) built: 1879
- Renovated: 1992 (restored)
- Client: Liverpool City Council

Design and construction
- Architect(s): Michel Joseph Napoléon Liénard
- Designations

Listed Building – Grade II*
- Official name: Steble Fountain
- Designated: 28 June 1952
- Reference no.: 1359621

The Steble Fountain stands on William Brown Street in Liverpool, England, to the west of Wellington's Column. It is recorded in the National Heritage List for England as a designated Grade II* listed building. It was donated to the city by a former mayor to fill a vacant plot to the west of the column. For much of the 2010s and 2020s, the fountain has needed repair and has not functioned.

== History ==
Towards the end of the 19th century, this was the only undeveloped portion of land between St George's Hall and the buildings on William Brown Street. In 1877 Lieutenant-Colonel Richard Fell Steble offered £1,000 (equivalent to £120,000 as of 2023) to the Improvement Committee of Liverpool City Council towards the erection of a fountain on the site. Steble had been Mayor of Liverpool from 1845 to 1847. The fountain was designed by Michel Joseph Napoléon Liénard and was unveiled in 1879. The casting from which the fountain was derived had originally been designed for the Paris Exposition of 1867 and has been reused with minor variations multiple times across the world, such as in the Brewer Fountain in Boston (USA) or the Tournoy fountain in Quebec City. At the opening ceremony in 1879 the mayor turned the fountain on with a silver key presented by Steble, but the water pressure was low and the effect was "dismal". The water was pumped by a steam pump in the basement of St George's Hall, and the noise from this tended to disrupt the proceedings in the courts above. The steam pump was later replaced by an electric pump. The fountain was restored in 1992 when the Tall Ships' Race came to Liverpool.

== Description ==
The fountain is constructed in cast iron with some bronze fittings. At the base of the fountain is a circular basin with a diameter of 30 feet (9.1 m). From the centre of the basin rises an octagonal stem on a cruciform base with the statue of a marine god at each corner. These statues depict Neptune, Amphitrite, Acis, and Galatea. Above this is a shallow octagonal bowl with a diameter of 12 feet 6 inches (3.8 m). It has 16 overflow outlets; these are decorated with scallops, Lancastrian roses, and marine grotesques. From the centre of this bowl rises another bowl about 8 feet (2.4 m) in diameter. This is surmounted by a mermaid holding a cornucopia. The total height of the fountain is 23 feet (7 m).

== See also ==
- Grade II* listed buildings in Liverpool – City Centre
