= F & G Holme =

Two Liverpool architects

F & G Holme were two Liverpool architects, Francis Usher Holme (c.1844-1913), and his uncle, George Holme (1822 or 3-1915), who lived during the 19th century. Their designs include, amongst others, the County Sessions House the Municipal Annexe and the Liverpool Institute for Performing Arts. Francis was also the architect who designed the Gymnasium to the rear of Newsham Park Hospital formerly the Royal Liverpool Seamen's Orphanage Institution.

== See also ==
- Liverpool Homeopathic Hospital
