= Thomas Mayo Brewer =

American naturalist

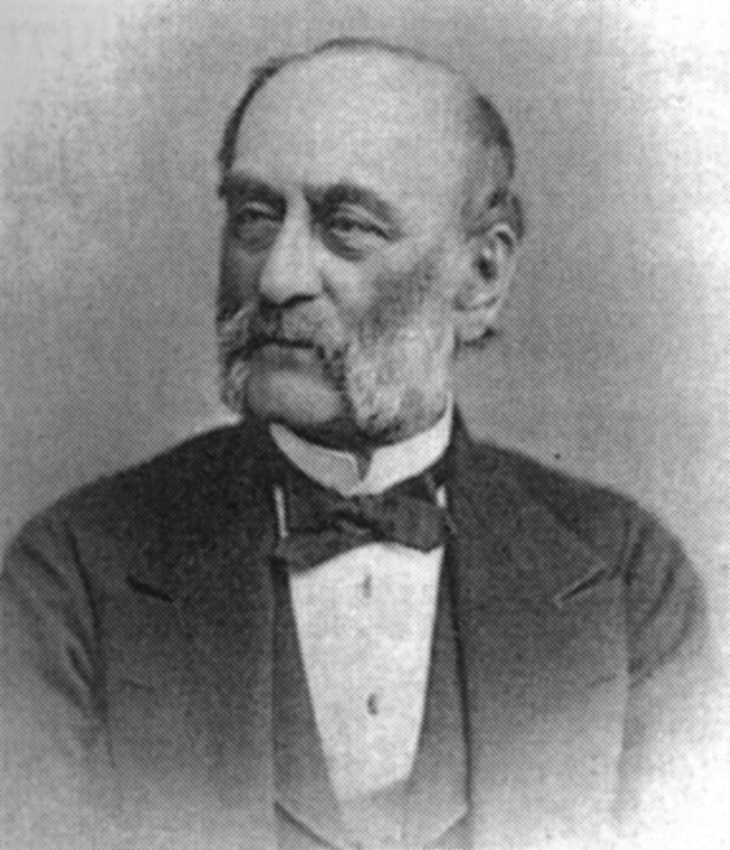
- Born: November 21, 1814; Boston, Massachusetts
- Died: January 24, 1880 (aged 65); Boston
- Education: Harvard College, Harvard Medical School
- Known for: A History of North American Birds, with Spencer Fullerton Baird and Robert Ridgway
- Spouse: Sally Coffin
- Children: Two
- Relatives: Gardner Brewer (brother)
- Scientific career
- Institutions: Hickling, Swan & Brewer (publisher in Boston)

Thomas Mayo Brewer (November 21, 1814 – January 24, 1880) was an American naturalist, specializing in ornithology and oology.

== Biography ==
Thomas Mayo Brewer was born in Boston, the younger brother of noted Boston merchant Gardner Brewer. He graduated from Harvard College in 1835 and from Harvard Medical School three years later. His interest in ornithology was such that he was elected a member of the Boston Society of Natural History in 1835.

He abandoned his career as a doctor after a few years to concentrate on ornithology, writing and politics, later becoming editor of the Boston Atlas in 1840. He was a friend of John James Audubon in that ornithologist's later life. In 1849, Brewer was placed in charge of the oological department for the Boston Society of Natural History.

Brewer continued working as a publisher while working as an ornithologist. He joined the publishing firm of Hickling, Swan & Brown, which became Hickling, Swan & Brewer when he became a partner in 1857; this firm subsequently became Swan, Brewer & Tileston. As an editor, he published Alexander Wilson's "Birds of America".

In 1857, Brewer completed his first of several volumes of North American Oology. However, Brewer is best known as a joint author, with Spencer Fullerton Baird and Robert Ridgway, of A History of North American Birds (3 volumes, 1874), which was the first attempt since John James Audubon's (thirty years prior) to complete the study of American ornithology.

Brewer also contributed to a number of ornithological publications, including John James Audubon's Ornithological Biography. Brewer was a companion to Audubon, who gave Brewer's name to a duck, a blackbird, and a mole found in Martha's vineyard.

In his last decade of life, Brewer sparred with Elliott Coues over the fate of the House Sparrow, a recently introduced bird that was multiplying far faster than expected. While Coues and most ornithologists were in favor of killing many of them off, Brewer tried to defend them. This ornithological event is known as "The Sparrow War." A similar non-native species introduction of the Eurasian tree sparrow was made by Carl Daenzer into Lafayette Park in St. Louis, Missouri during the 1870s.

Brewer died in Boston on January 24, 1880, while the fate of the sparrow was still being debated.

== Personal life ==
Brewer married Sally Coffin in 1849. They had two children.

The Brewer family has been prominent in Massachusetts for 200 years, including James Brewer (1742–1806), an early American patriot leader and businessman, Gen. Wilmon Blackmar, a Civil War medal of honor winner, and Wilmon Brewer, a poet, biographer, and philanthropist.
