= Brewer Fountain =

Fountain and sculpture in Boston, Massachusetts, U.S.

Coordinates: 42.35619°N 71.06310°W

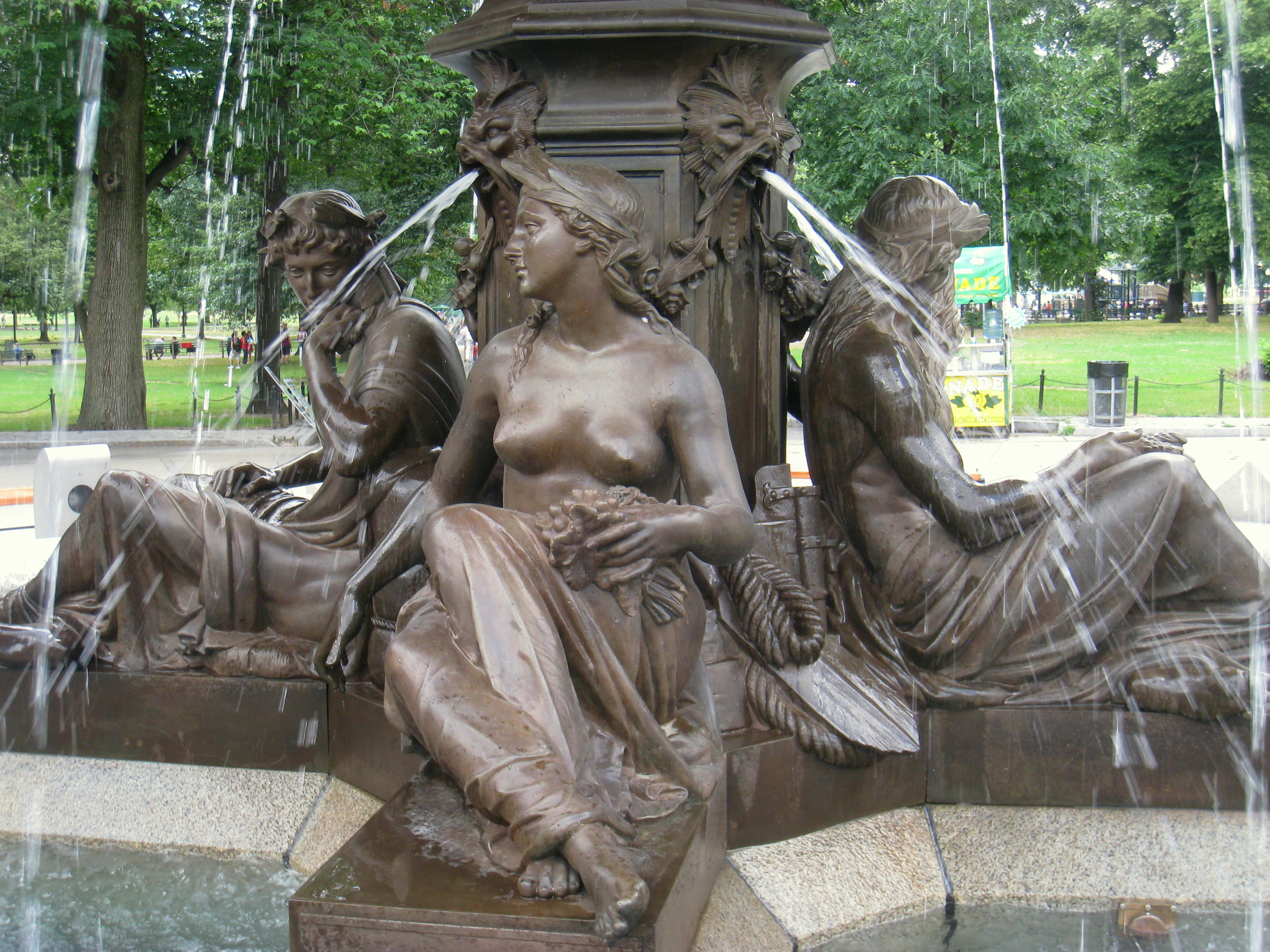
- Brewer Fountain
- Artist: Michel Joseph Napoléon Liénard
- Completion date: 3 June 1868
- Medium: Bronze
- Subject: Neptune, Amphitrite (Neptune's wife), and Acis and Galatea
- Dimensions: 670 cm (260 in)
- Weight: 15,000 pounds
- Location: Boston, Massachusetts

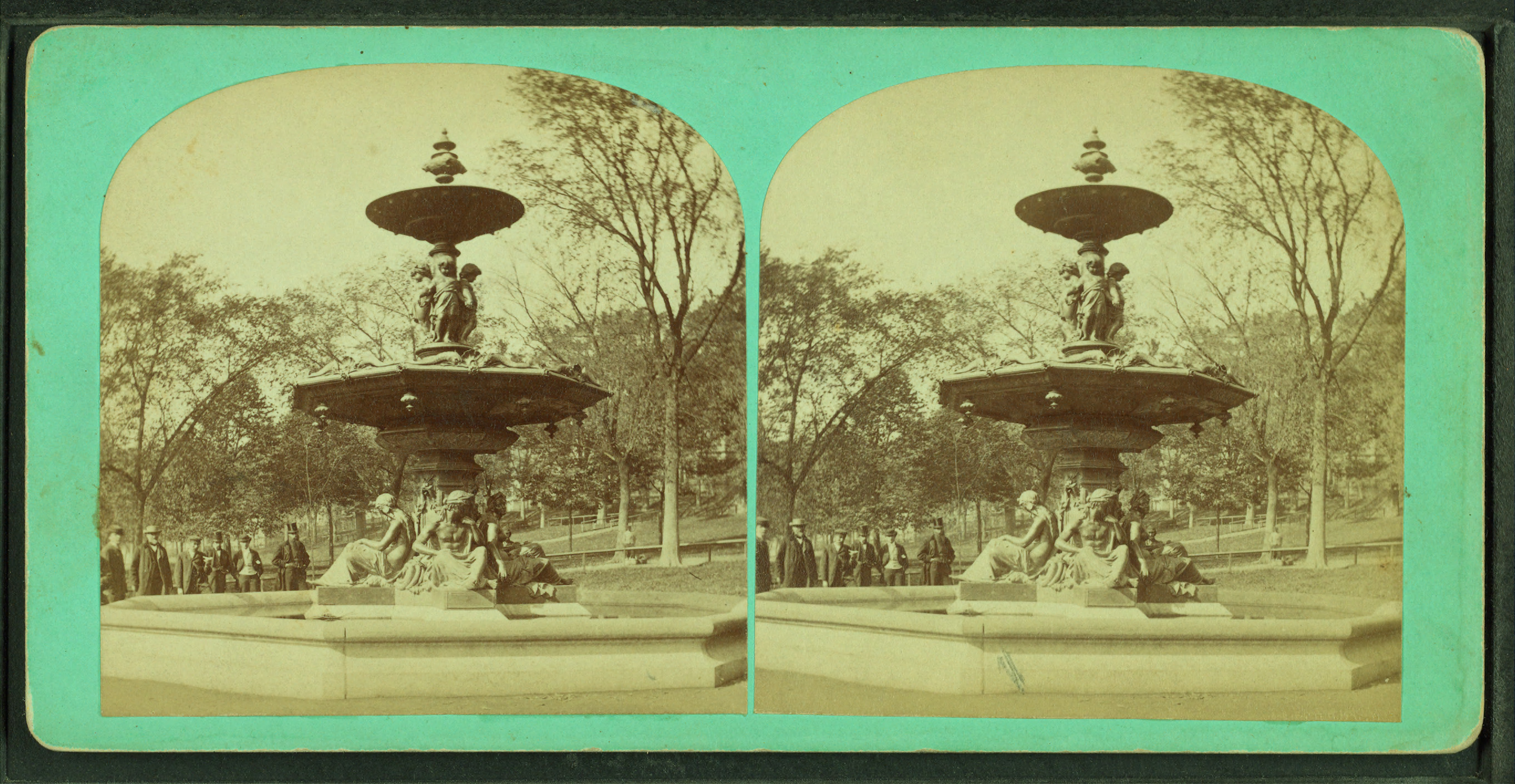
One of many stereoscopic images of the fountain

Brewer Fountain is an 1868 bronze sculpture by Michel Joseph Napoléon Liénard. It stands near the corner of Park and Tremont Streets in Boston, Massachusetts, by Park Street Station.

== History ==
The 22-foot-tall (6.7 m), 15,000-pound (6,800 kg) bronze fountain, cast in Paris, was a gift to the city by Gardner Brewer. It began to function for the first time on June 3, 1868. It is one of several casts of the original, featured at the 1855 Paris World Fair, designed by French artist Michel Joseph Napoléon Liénard; other copies with minor variations can be found across the world, including the Steble Fountain in Liverpool or the Tourny Fountain in Québec.

At least sixteen other copies exist, including one on Av. Cordoba y Cerrito in Buenos Aires and in Salvador de Bahia, Brazil. The fountain is decorated with the figures of Neptune, Amphitrite (Neptune's wife), and Acis and Galatea, a couple from Greek mythology. It fell into disrepair and finally stopped functioning entirely in 2003. A major repair project began in 2009. After a year-long $640,000 off-site restoration led by sculpture conservator Joshua Craine of Daedalus Inc., it was re-dedicated on May 26, 2010.

== See also ==
- 1868 in art
