= Liverpool Homeopathic Hospital =

Former hospital in England

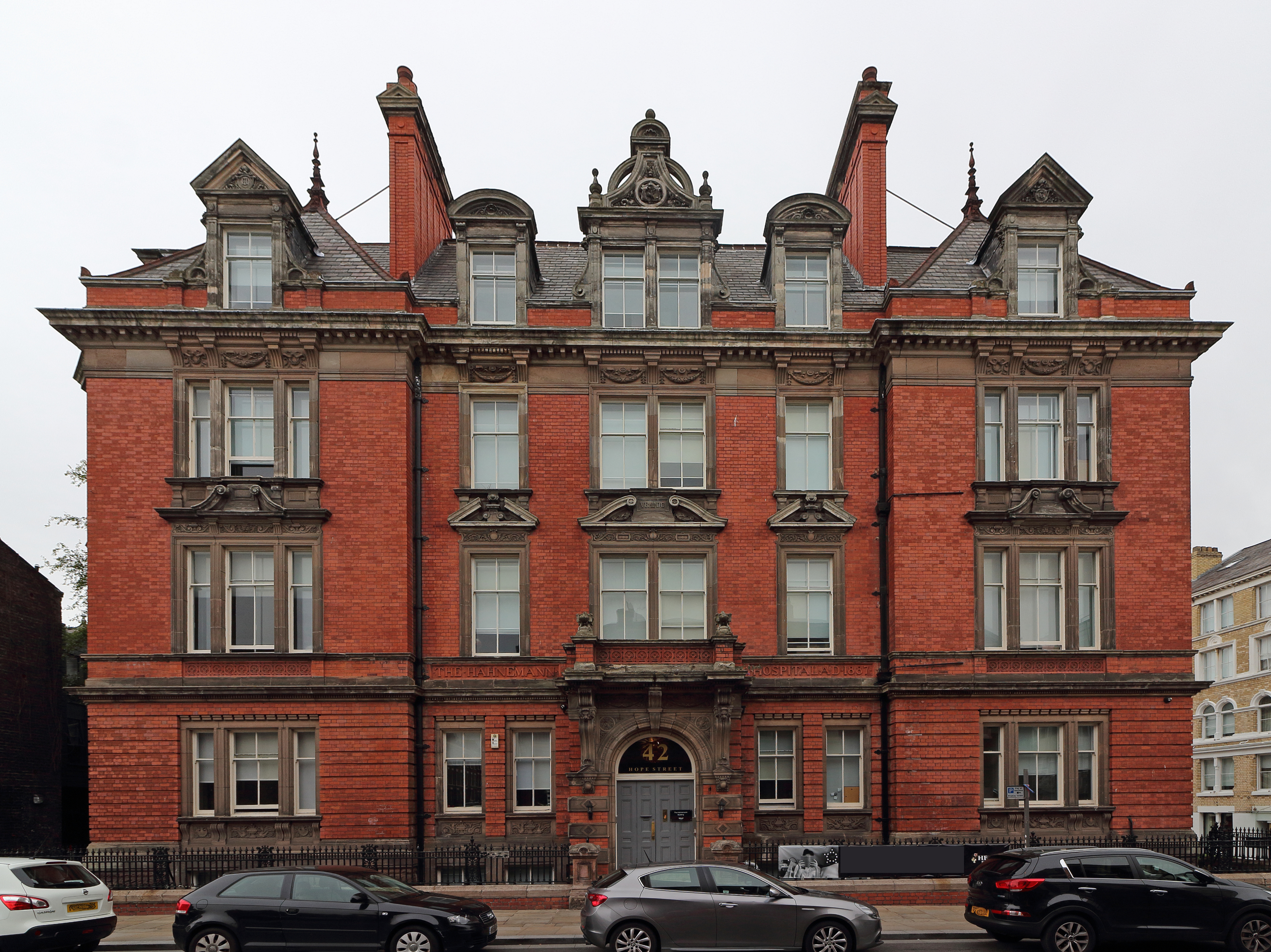
- The former Liverpool Homeopathic Hospital building on Hope Street in 2018

- Merseyside

Geography
- Location: Liverpool, Merseyside, England, United Kingdom
- Coordinates: 53.4006°N 2.9713°W

Organisation
- Care system: Public NHS
- Type: District General

Services
- Emergency department: No Accident & Emergency

History
- Founded: 1887

Links
- Lists: Hospitals in England

The Liverpool Homeopathic Hospital was a hospital in Liverpool, England, that specialized in homeopathic treatments.

== History ==
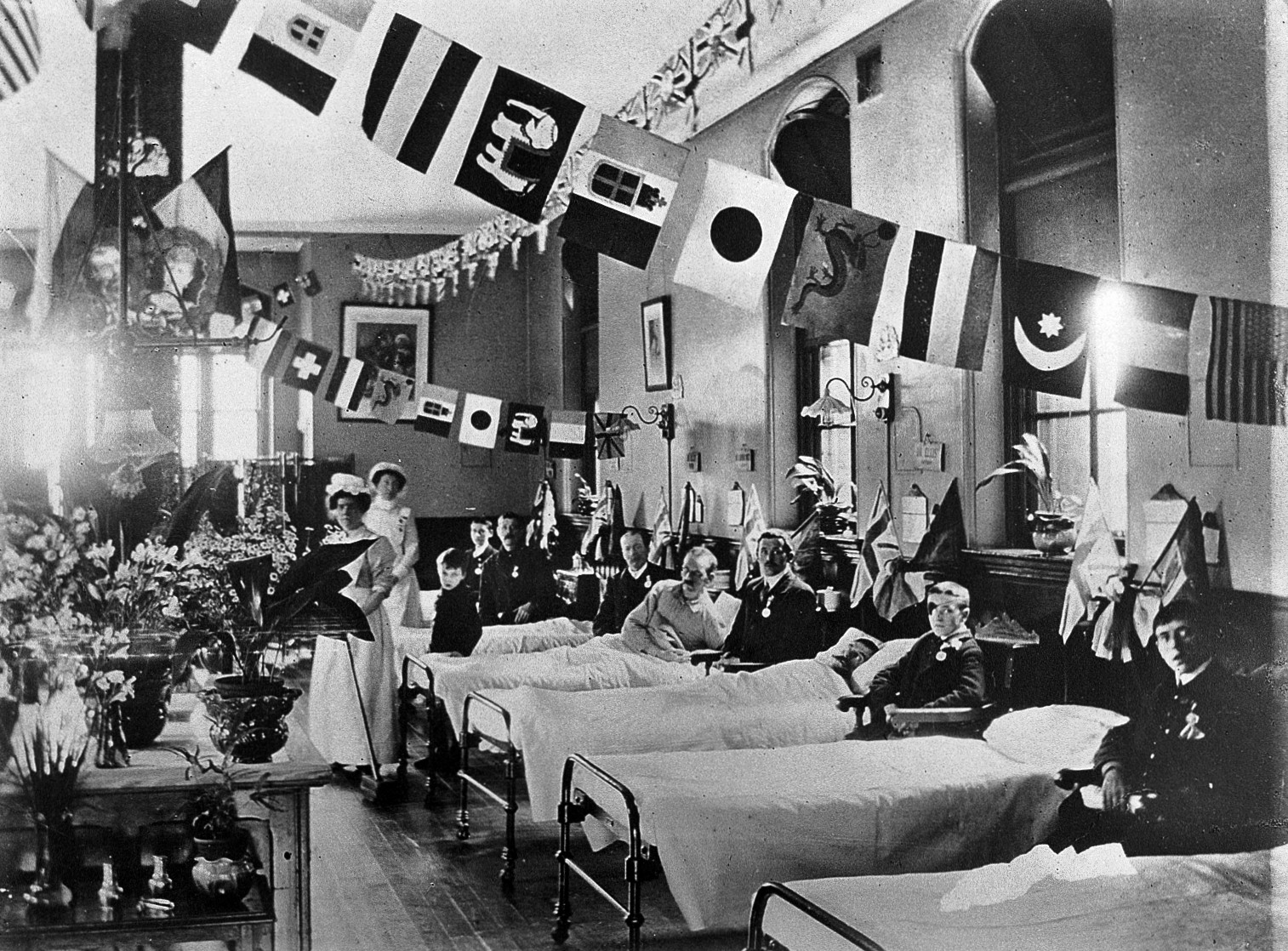
A ward at the Liverpool Homeopathic Hospital, possibly decorated for the coronation of George V in 1910

The facility was founded as the Liverpool Hahnemann Hospital and Dispensaries in 1887. The hospital building at 42-56 Hope Street, designed by F & G Holme, is an example of the Queen Anne revival style. It is now a Grade II listed building. It was the first hospital in the United Kingdom to contain early hydraulic lifts and an innovative heating and ventilation system. It joined the National Health Service in 1948. Renamed as the Hahnemann Hospital in 1969, it was eventually closed in 1976. It later became part of Liverpool John Moores University.
