= Michel Joseph Napoléon Liénard =

French sculptor (1810–1870)

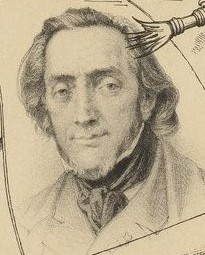

Michel Joseph Napoléon Liénard (1810–1870) was a French sculptor and ornamentalist.

== Works ==
Variants of the same fountain design were used by Liénard multiple times, with minor alterations:

- Brewer Fountain, Boston (Massachusetts, United States of America)
- Steble Fountain, Liverpool (England, United Kingdom)
- Tourny Fountain, Quebec City (Quebec, Canada), previously in Bordeaux (France)
- Tourny Fountain, Soulac-sur-Mer (France)
- Mail Fountain, Angers (France)
- Fountain in Prince's Square, Launceston (Tasmania, Australia)
- Fountain in the English garden in Geneva (Switzerland)

Among his other fountains based on different designs:

- Fontaine des-Arts-et-Metiers, Square Émile-Chautemps, Paris (1860).
