= Motherless (sculpture) =

British sculpture by George Anderson Lawson (1889)

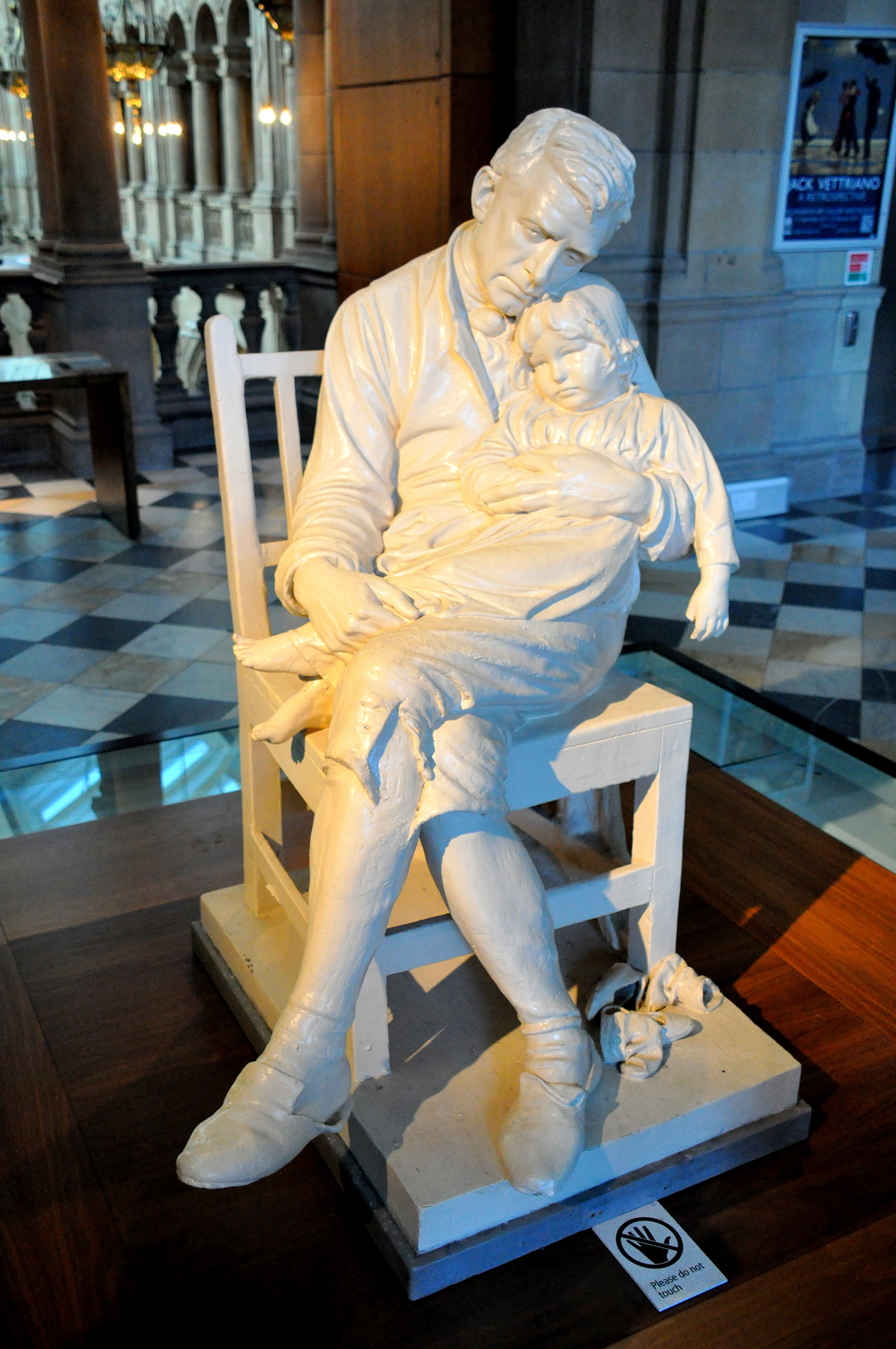
Motherless at the Kelvingrove Art Gallery and Museum

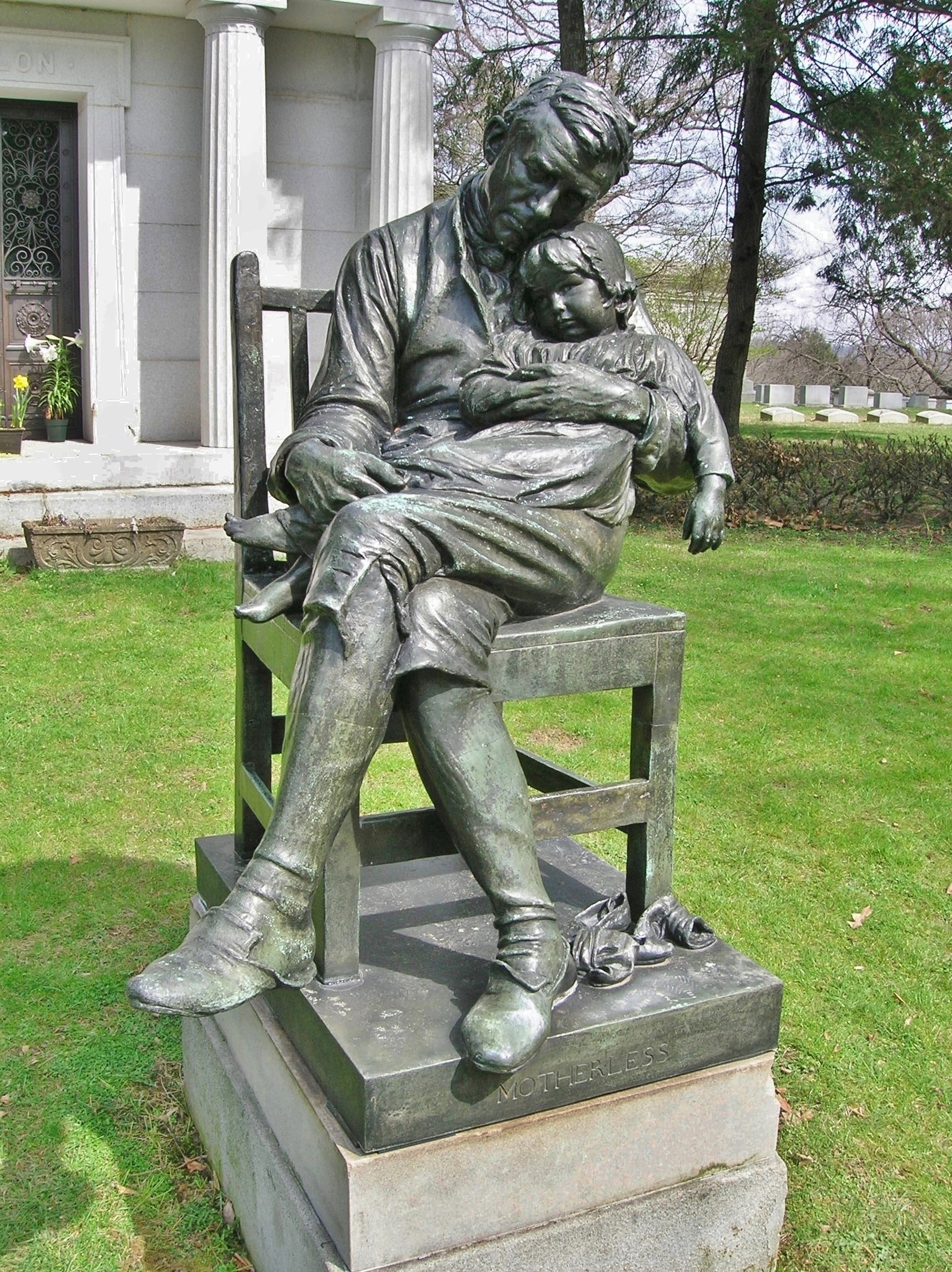
Motherless at the Homewood Cemetery in Pittsburgh

Motherless is an 1889 sculpture by George Anderson Lawson. It depicts a child in the arms of their seated father. It is in the collection of the Kelvingrove Art Gallery and Museum in Glasgow.

It was selected for the Royal Academy's Summer Exhibition in 1889 and exhibited in the Lecture Room. The sculpture is made from plaster. It was bought by the Kelvingrove Art Gallery and Museum in Glasgow in 1901. The Builder described it as a "fine work and full of distinction". In The Builder's review of the Summer Exhibition of 1889 it described Motherless as "perhaps the most successful work of the year" and that he has composed the group to be "so thoroughly sculpturesque" without losing the "simplicity of nature" and that it favourably compared to works by Jules Dalou.

T.C.F. Brotchie, in his 1927 book Hours in the Glasgow Art Galleries, described it as " ... a striking group, refined in conception and craftsmanship, a story told by an artist of great accomplishment, and as such it appeals to the artist as well as to the layman".

A bronze copy of Motherless stands in the Homewood Cemetery in Pittsburgh outside the mausoleum of R.B. Mellon. It was placed in the cemetery at the behest of R.B. Mellon, who had redesigned his garden and felt that the sculpture was no longer appropriate there.
