= Gardner Brewer =

Boston merchant (1806–1874)

Gardner Brewer (1806 – September 30, 1874) was one of the wealthiest Boston merchants of the 19th-century.

Brewer was born in Boston. After becoming an adult, he was for some time a distiller, but afterward engaged in the dry-goods trade, and founded the house of Gardner Brewer & Co., which represented some of the largest mills in New England, and had branches in New York and Philadelphia. In this business, by accurate method combined with great sagacity, he accumulated a fortune, which, at his death, was estimated at several millions of dollars. Brewer at one time took an active part in politics as a Republican. He was also a strong protectionist, and took great interest in the industrial development of the country. He used his large wealth liberally for the public good, and shortly before his death gave to the City of Boston a beautiful fountain, which stands on an angle of the common. His residence, on the site of the house of John Hancock, is one of the finest private dwellings in the city. The "great fire" in Boston (November 1872) destroyed the old warehouse of the firm; but before the end of 1873 a new building, one of the costliest in Boston, was erected on its site. He died in Newport, Rhode Island at his villa. He was the older brother of the naturalist Thomas Mayo Brewer.

== See also ==
- Brewer Fountain, Boston Common
