= William Brown Street =

Road in Liverpool, England

- Liverpool Cultural Quarter
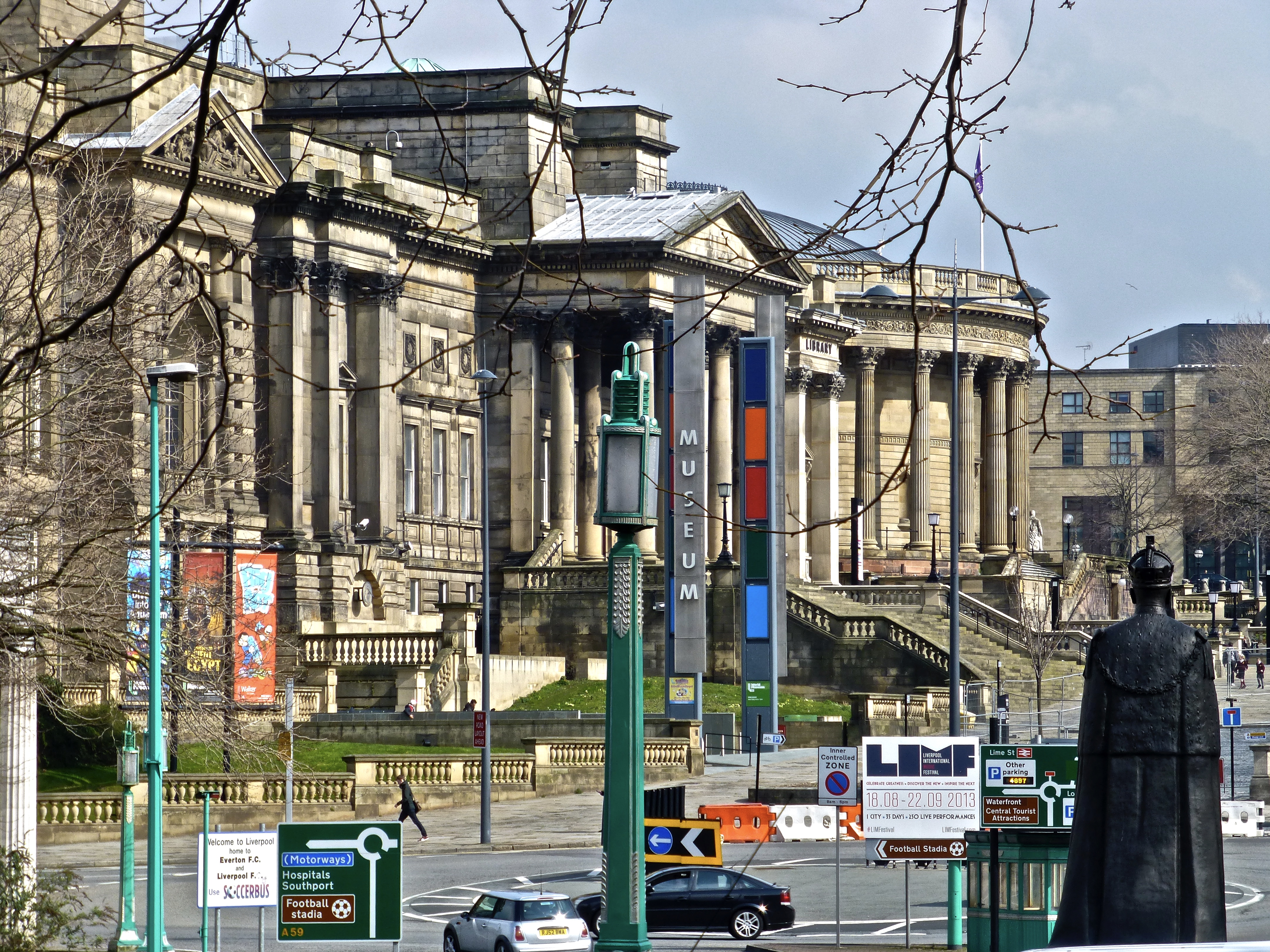
- William Brown Street as viewed from the Queensway Tunnel

- Location within Liverpool
- 53°24′34″N 02°58′54″W
- Type: Street and public square
- Location: Liverpool city centre

History
- Built: 1860

Site notes
- Architectural style: Victorian Neoclassical

Listed Building

William Brown Street in Liverpool, England, is a road that is remarkable for its concentration of public buildings. It is sometimes referred to as the "Cultural Quarter".

Originally known as Shaw's Brow, a coaching road east from the city, it is named after William Brown, a local MP and philanthropist, who in 1860 donated land in the area for the building of a library and museum. This area gives its name as the William Brown Street conservation area.

== Buildings of note ==
The conservation area contains:

- William Brown Library and Museum — housing part of World Museum Liverpool and part of Liverpool Central Library
- College of Technology and Museum Extension — part of World Museum Liverpool
- Picton Reading Room and Hornby Library — part of Liverpool Central Library
- Walker Art Gallery
- County Sessions House
- The Wellington Memorial
- The Steble Fountain
- St George's Hall
- St John's Gardens
- Entrance to Queensway Tunnel
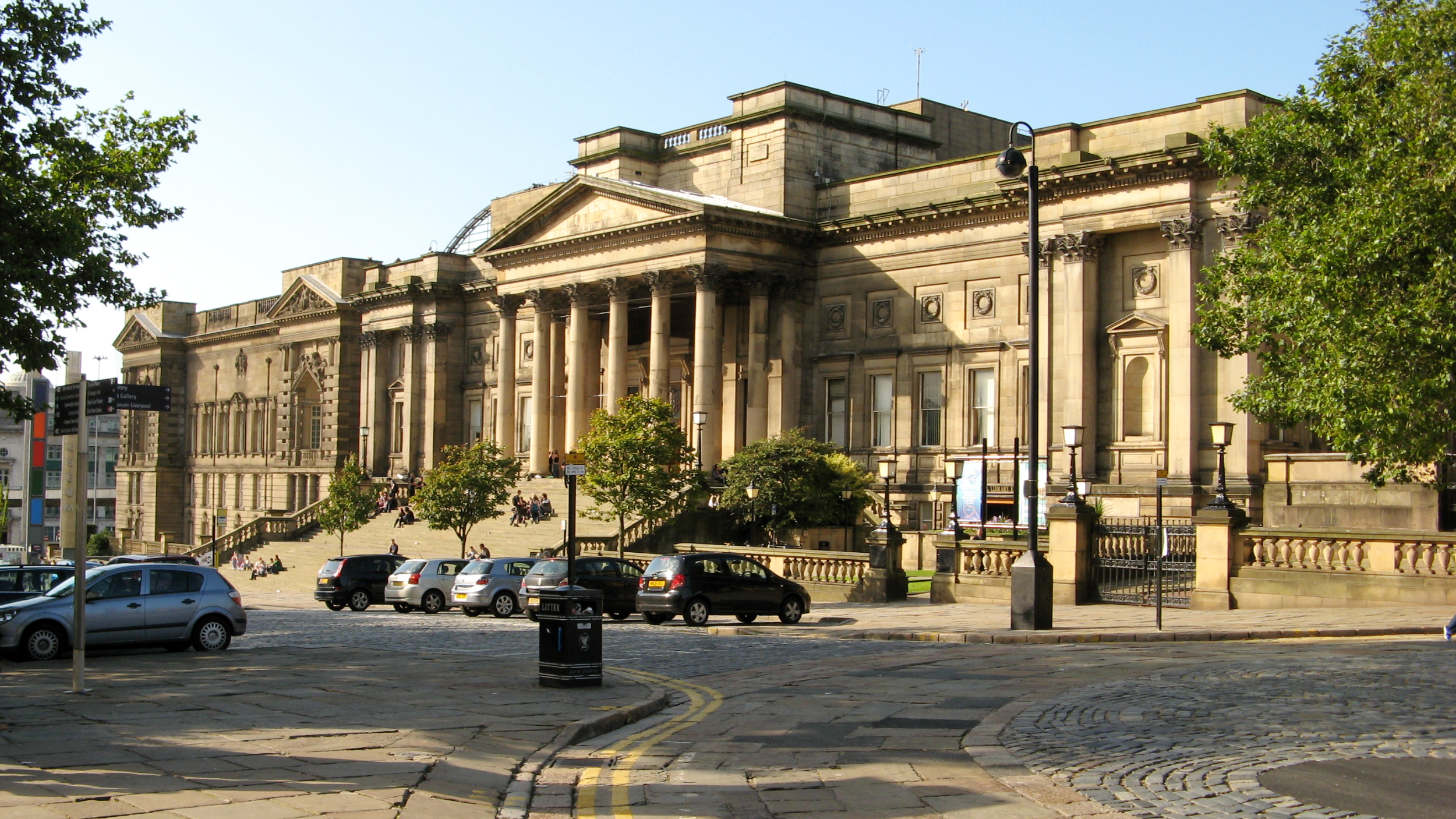
World Museum Liverpool

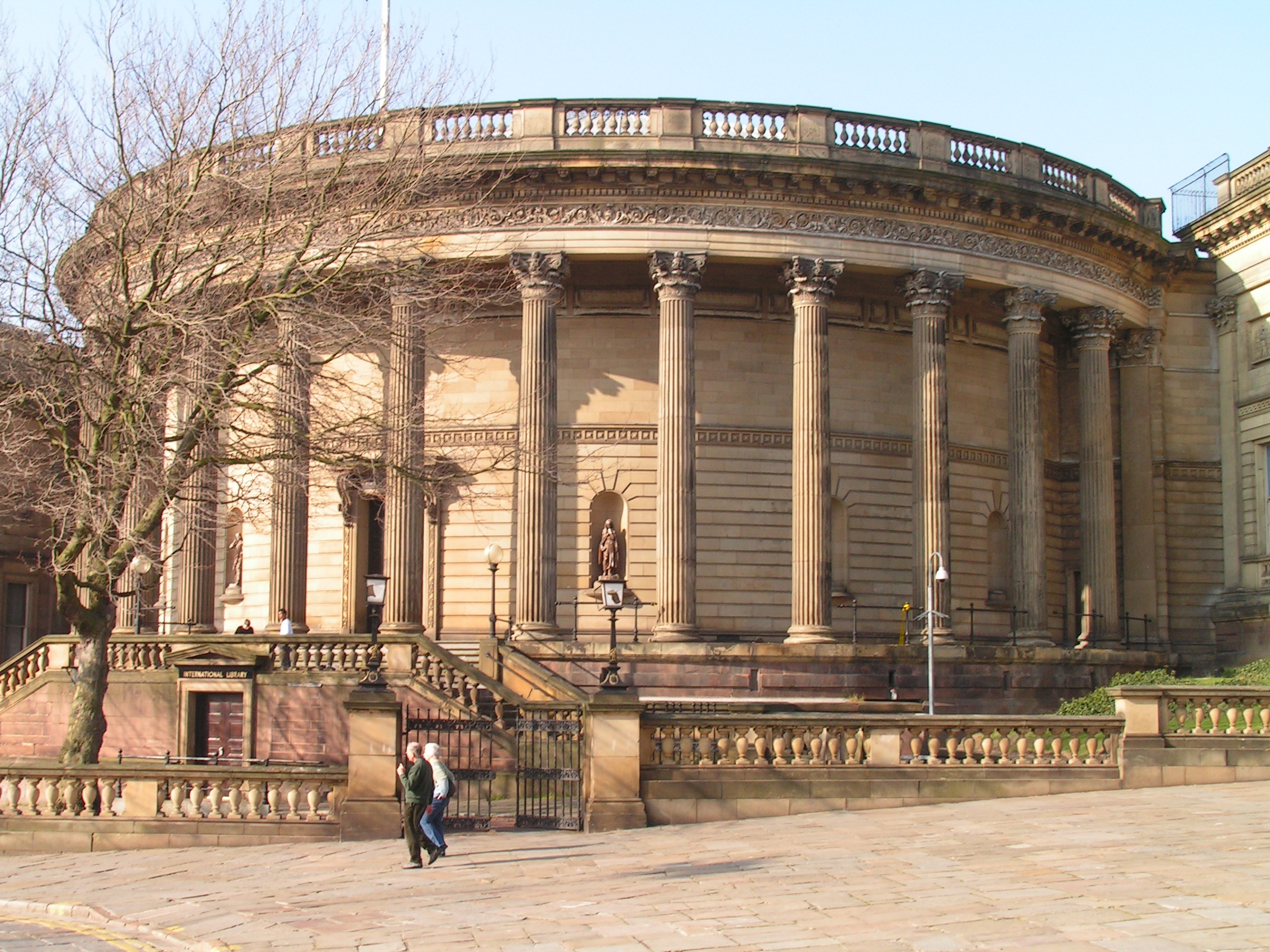
Liverpool Central Library

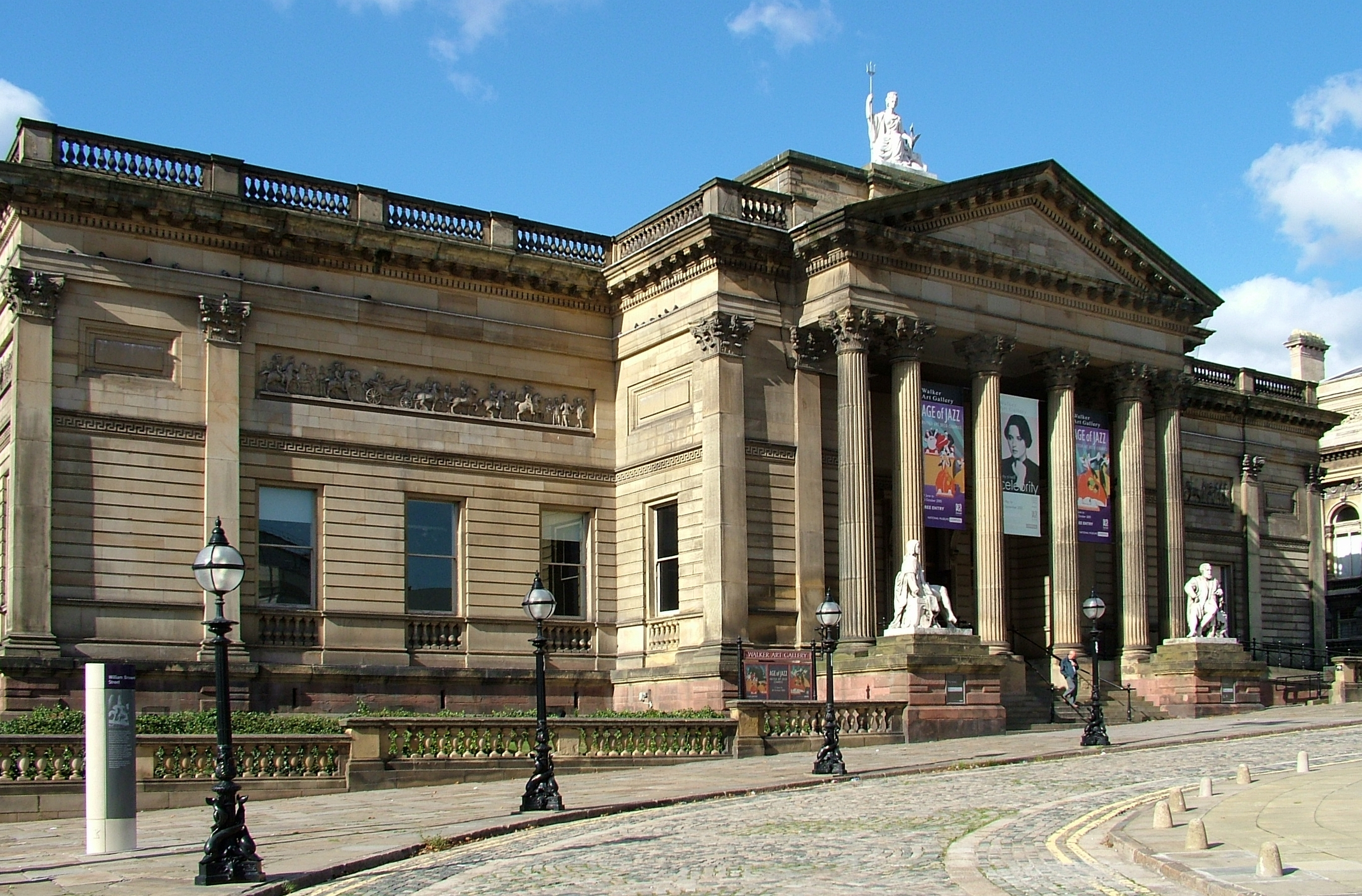
Walker Art Gallery

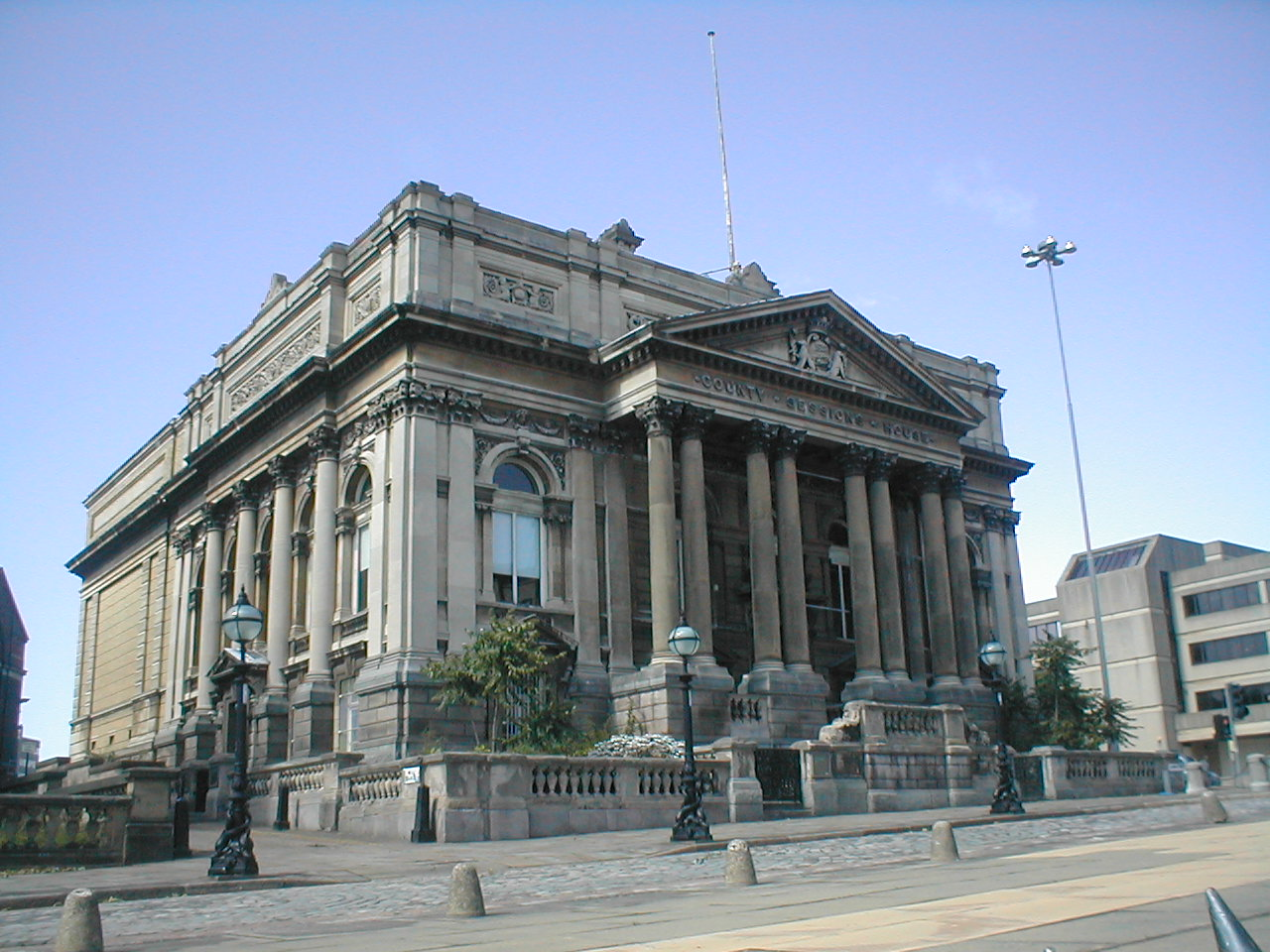
County Sessions House

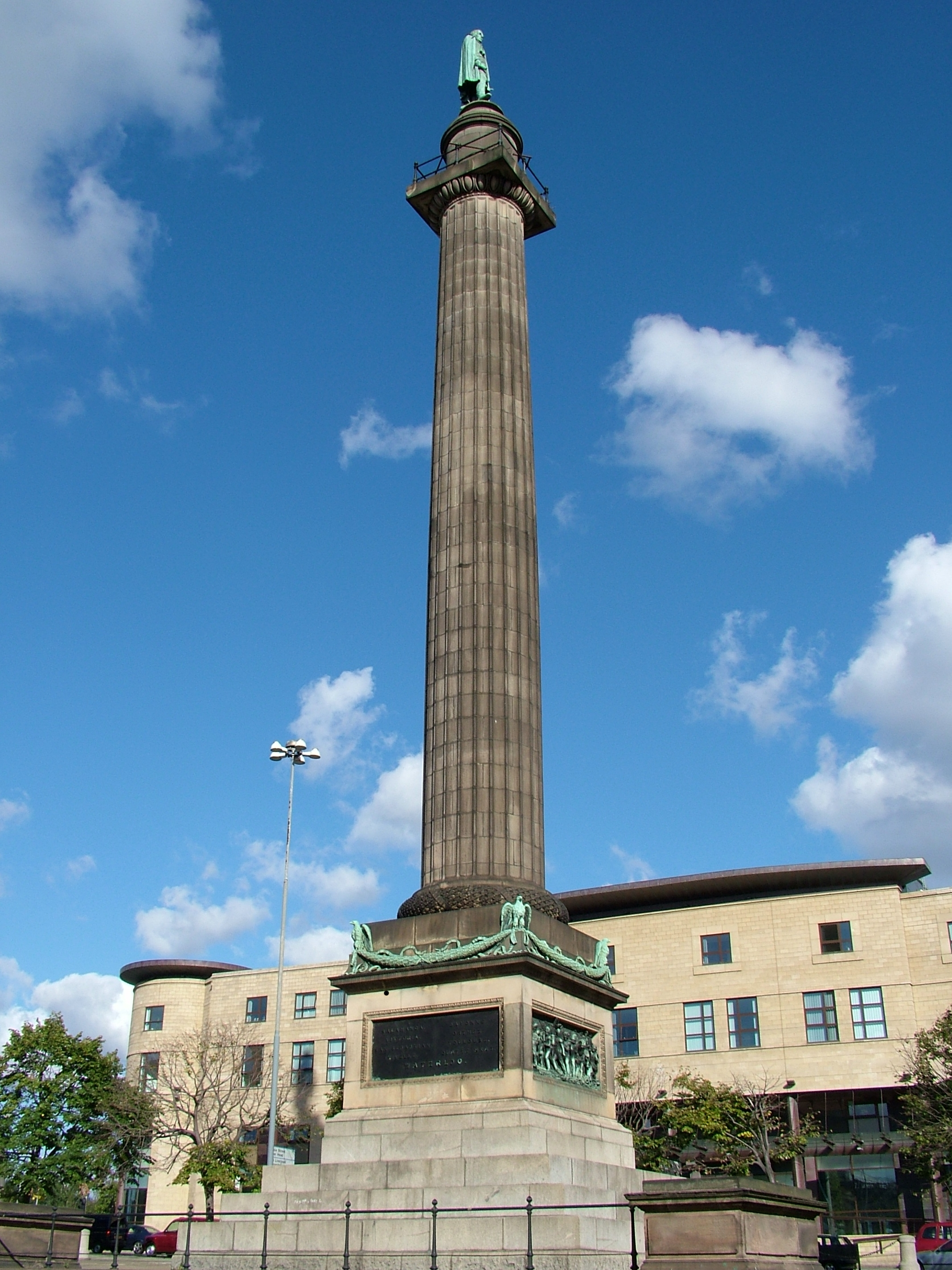
Wellington's Column

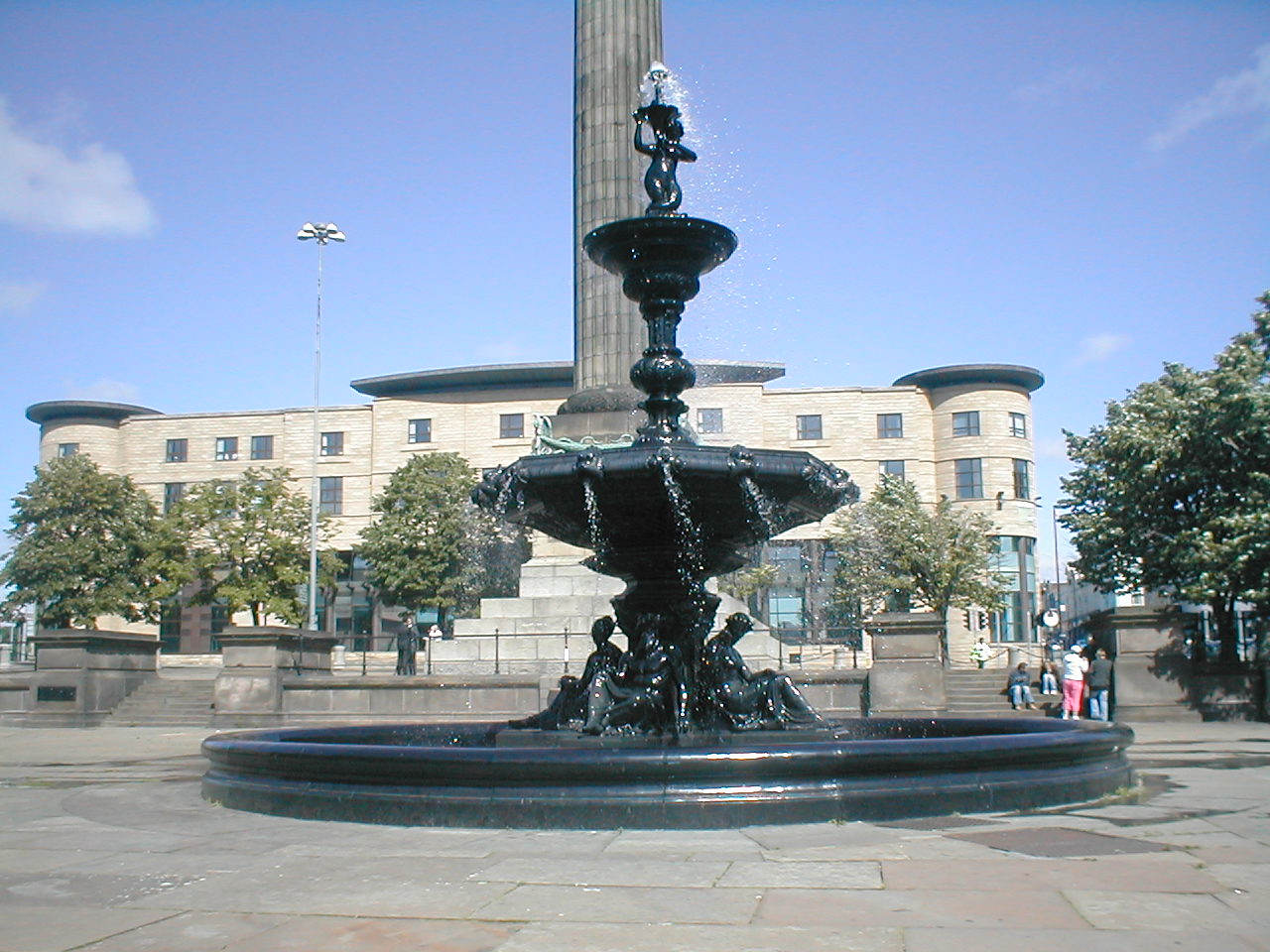
Steble Fountain

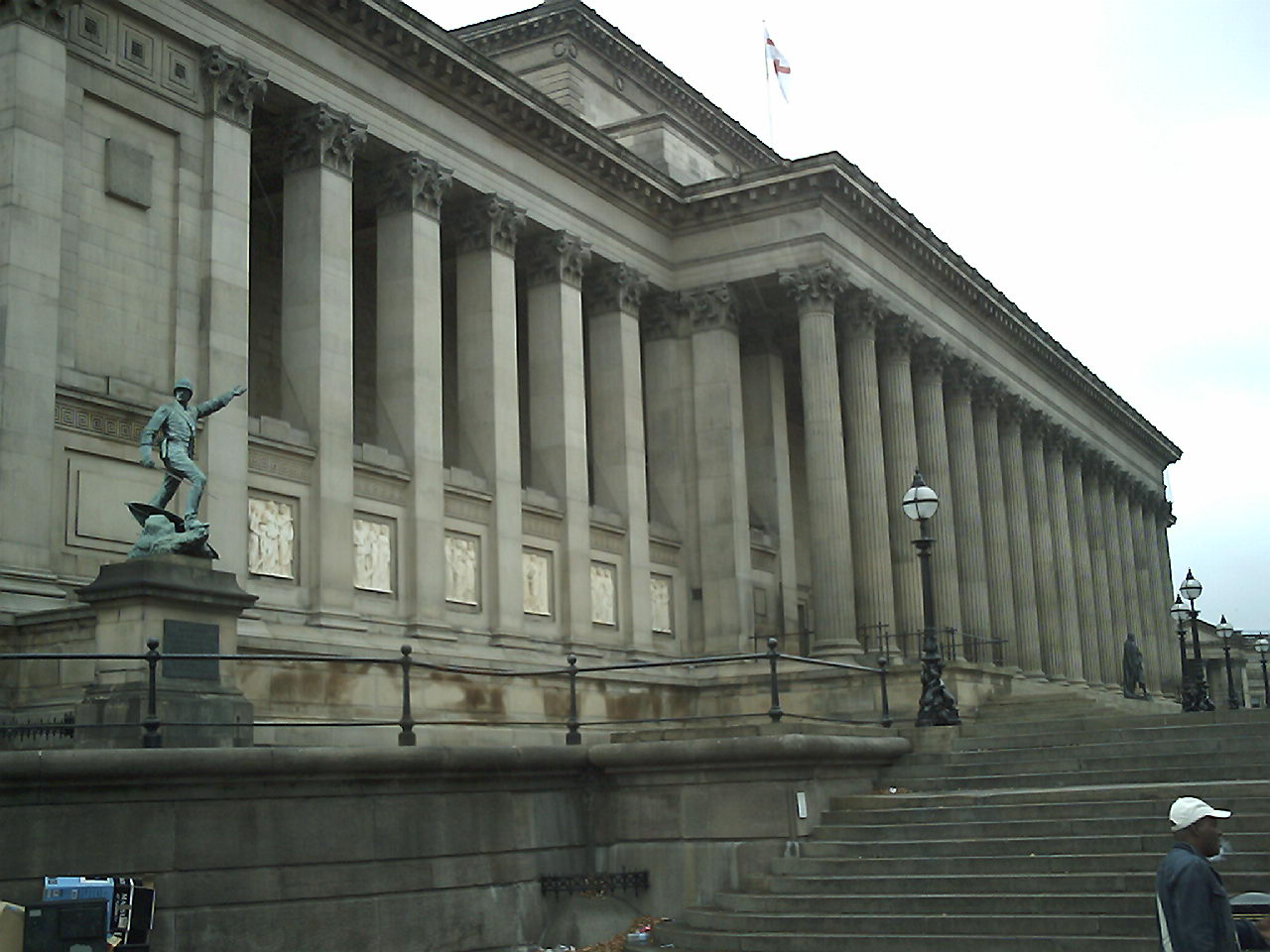
St George's Hall

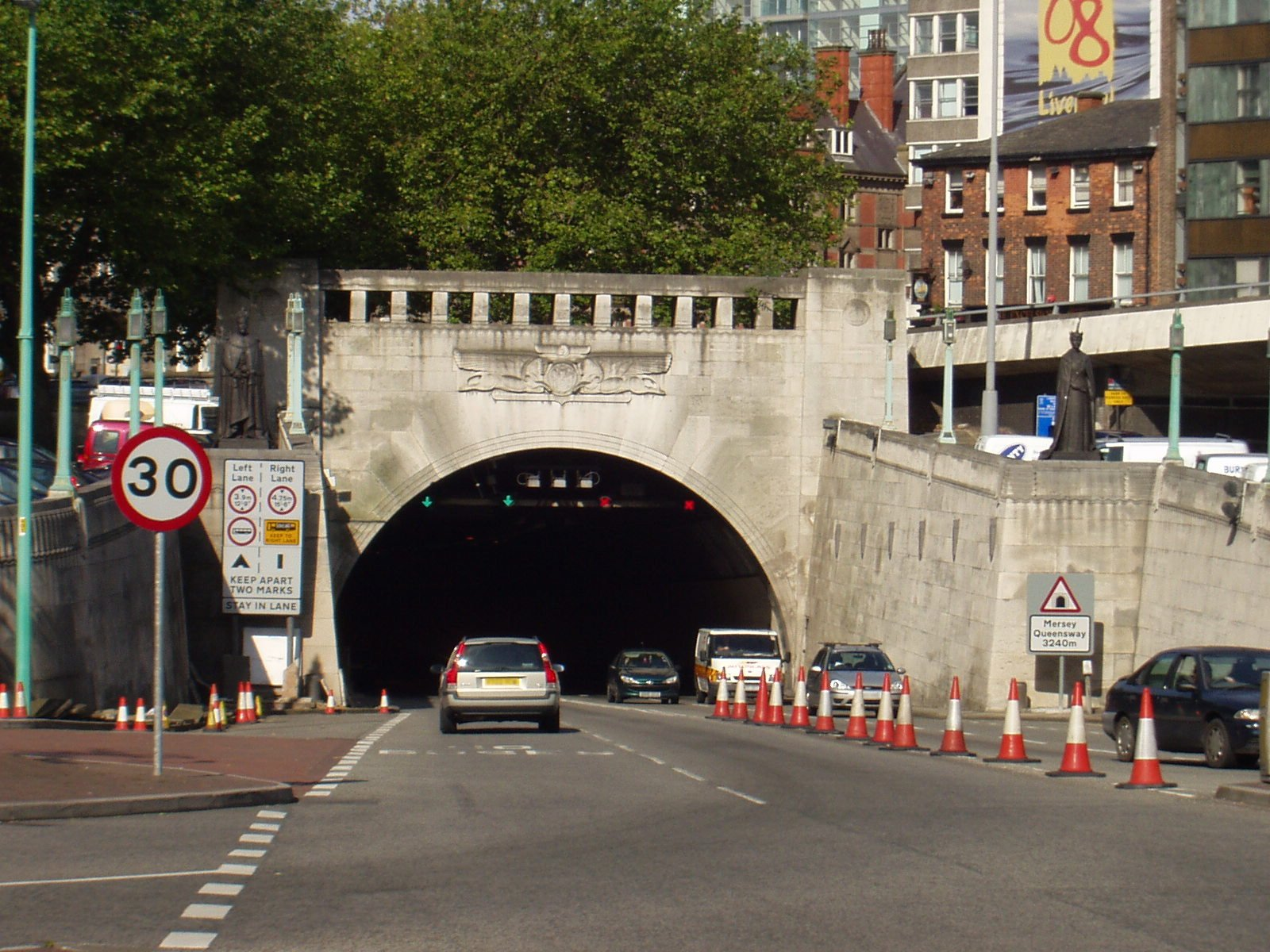
Queensway Tunnel
