= Wellington's Column =

Monument to the Duke of Wellington in Liverpool, England

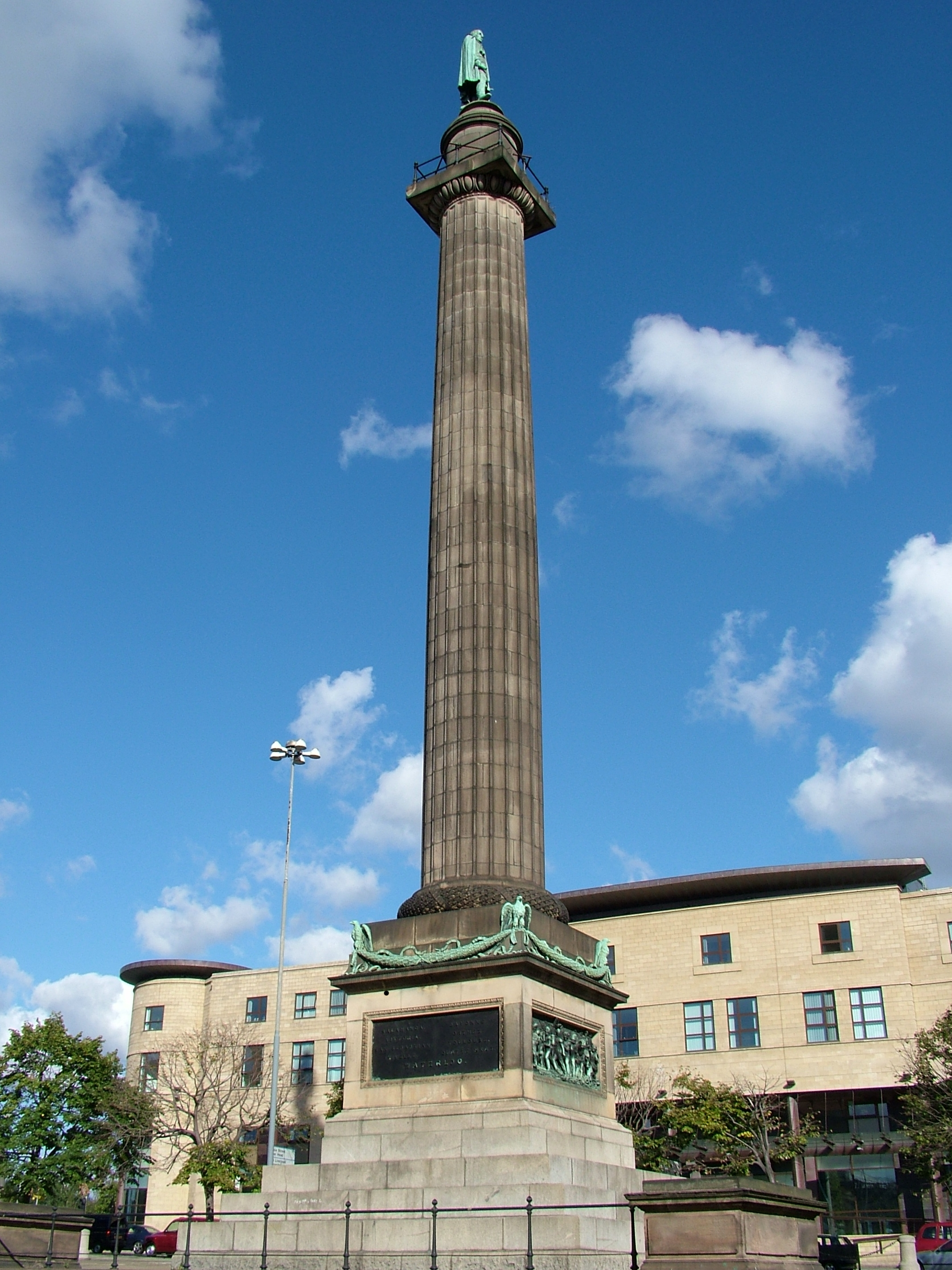
- Wellington's Column

- Location in Merseyside
- 53.40958°N 2.97885°W
- Location: Liverpool, Merseyside, England
- OS grid reference: SJ 351 908

History
- Built: 1861–65

Site notes
- Architect(s): Andrew Lawson; George Anderson Lawson

Listed Building – Grade II*
- Official name: Wellington Column
- Designated: 28 June 1952
- Reference no.: 1063784

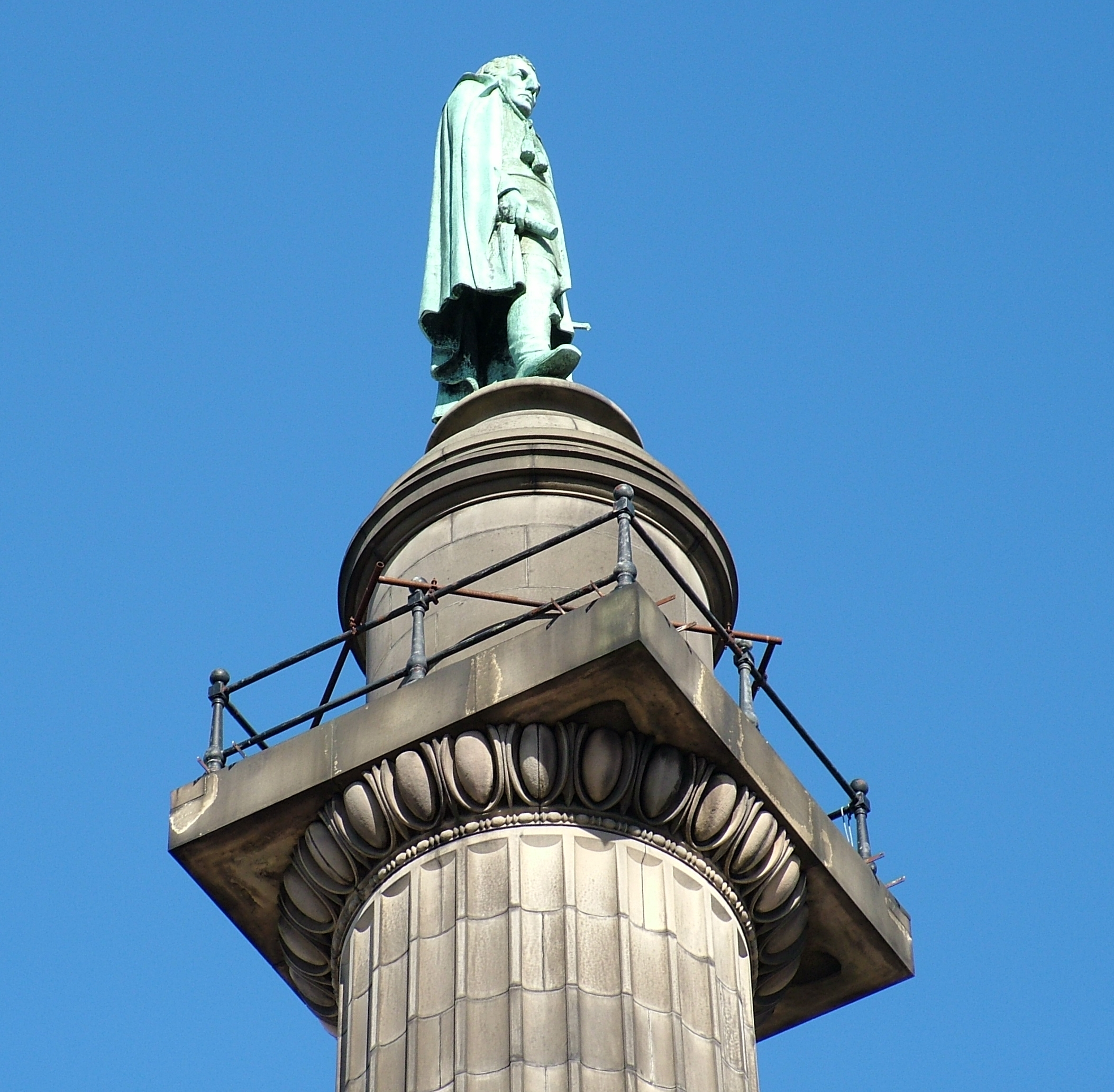
Wellington at the top of the column

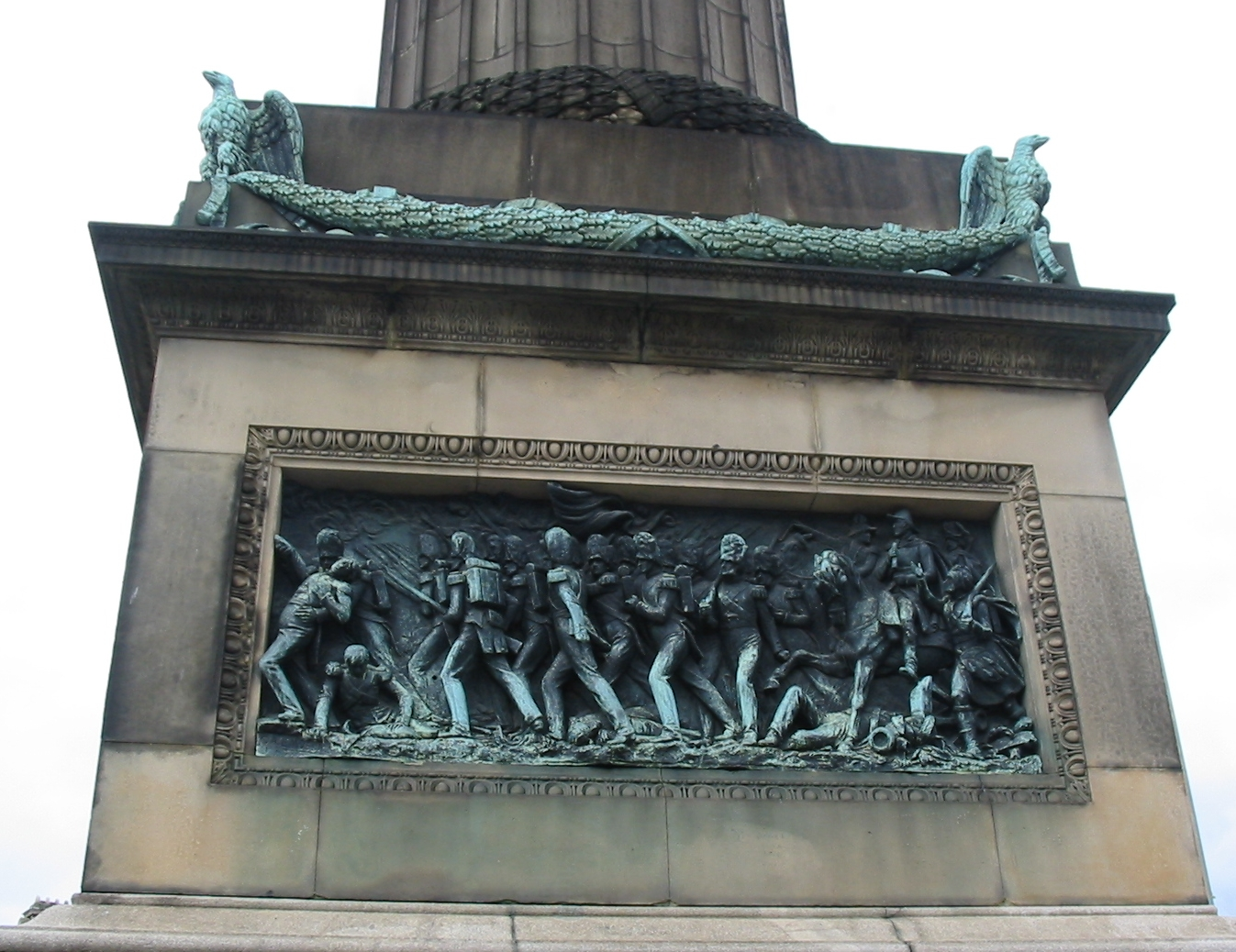
Relief of the Battle of Waterloo

Wellington's Column, or the Waterloo Memorial, is a monument to the Duke of Wellington standing on the corner of William Brown Street and Lime Street in Liverpool, England. It is recorded in the National Heritage List for England as a designated Grade II* listed building.

== History ==
After the Duke's death in 1852, in common with other cities, Liverpool decided to erect a monument to celebrate his achievements. A committee was established to organise public subscriptions, but the money was slow to come in. A competition was set up in 1856 to find a designer for the column, and this was won by the architect Andrew Lawson of Edinburgh. There were further delays while a suitable site was found, with sites at the top of Duke Street and Bold Street, in front of the Adelphi Hotel and Prince's Park being considered before the eventual location was settled on. In 1861 a second competition, this time for the statue of the Duke, was won by George Anderson Lawson, brother of the column's designer. The design of the column and plinth closely resembles that of the Melville Monument commemorating Henry Dundas, Lord Melville in St Andrew Square, Edinburgh, itself loosely modelled on Trajan's Column in Rome.

The foundation stone was laid on 1 May 1861 by the Mayor of Liverpool. There were further delays during construction of the monument due to subsidence. Although it was inaugurated on 16 May 1863 in a ceremony attended by the mayor and Sir William Brown, it was still not complete. Reliefs depicting Wellington's victories and the charge at the Battle of Waterloo were still to be added and it was finally completed towards the end of 1865. These delays resulted in its being "a very late example of a column-monument for Britain".

== Description ==
The foundations of the monument are in Runcorn sandstone, the pedestal is in granite, and the column itself is in Darley Dale sandstone. The overall height of the monument is 132 feet (40.2 m), the column being 81 feet (24.7 m) tall and the statue 25 feet (7.6 m) tall. It stands on a stepped base with a square pedestal. On each side of the pedestal is a bronze plaque; at the corners are bronze eagles joined by swags along the sides. Standing on the pedestal is a Roman Doric fluted column. Within the column are 169 steps leading up to a viewing platform. On top of the column is a cylinder surmounted by a cupola on which the bronze statue of the Duke stands. The statue is made from the melted-down bronze from cannons captured at the Battle of Waterloo. The Duke holds a scroll in his right hand, and his left hand rests on the hilt of his sword.

The brass plaque on the south of the pedestal is a relief depicting the final charge at the battle of Waterloo. On the east and west faces, the plaques bear the names of the Duke's victorious battles. The east panel lists the battles of Assaye, Talavera, Argaum, Busaco, Roliça, Fuentes de Oñoro, Vimeiro, Ciudad Rodrigo, Oporto, and Badajoz; the west panel Salamanca, Bayonne, Vittoria, Orthez, San Sebastián, Toulouse, Nivelle, Quatre Bras, and Waterloo. Also on and around the base of the monument are pre-metric standard Board of Trade measurements of length, the shorter ones being embossed on a bronze panel. Set into the pavement is a brass strip containing the measure of 100 feet (30.5 m), and a chain of 100 links.

== See also ==
- Grade II* listed buildings in Liverpool – City Centre
