= Grade II* listed buildings in Liverpool city centre =

There are over 2,500 listed buildings (Note: The actual list consists of 1,471 individual entries, which cover over 2,500 buildings and structures throughout the city) in Liverpool, England. A listed building is one considered to be of special architectural, historical or cultural significance, which is protected from being demolished, extended or altered, unless special permission is granted by the relevant planning authorities. Of the listed buildings in Liverpool, 105 are classified as Grade II* and are recognised as being particularly important with more than special architectural or historic interest. Of these, 46 are located within the L1, L2 and L3 postcodes, which cover the city centre of Liverpool. The following list provides information on all the Grade II* listed buildings within these postcodes.

== Buildings ==
Building(s)	Location	Image	Built	Notes	Coordinates	Ref
Nos. 159–163 (odd)	Duke Street		1765		53.4007°N 2.9779°W	
Nos. 169 and 171	Duke Street		1765		53.4006°N 2.9776°W	
No. 62	Rodney Street		1792–93	Birthplace of William Ewart Gladstone.	53.4006°N 2.9739°W	
The Lyceum	Bold Street		1802	The Lyceum, designed by Thomas Harrison, was built at the beginning of the 19th century to house what was the first gentlemen's subscription library in England. Designed in classical-style it was constructed from ashlar stone. The building entrance consists of a recessed portico with Ionic columns and pediment. The original construction consisted of only one storey, with the raised roof second storey being added later.	53.4045°N 2.9807°W	
Nelson Monument	Exchange Flags		1807–08		53.4076°N 2.9920°W	
Church of St Luke	Berry Street		1811–32	The Church of St Luke is a former Anglican church designed by John Foster in Neo-Gothic-style. It is built from ashlar sandstone and was subject to minor amendments between 1864–73. Extensively damaged by bombing during WWII. Despite damage is recognised for its architectural and historical significance to Liverpool.	53.4017°N 2.9751°W	
Wellington Rooms	Mount Pleasant		1815	Subsequently The Irish Centre, closed since 1997.	53.4039°N 2.9706°W	
Church of St Andrew	Rodney Street		1823		53.4029°N 2.9725°W	
Nos. 1 and 3	Duke Street		Early 19th century		53.4027°N 2.9852°W	
No. 24	Hanover Street		Early 19th century		53.4027°N 2.9851°W	
Nos. 26–30 (even)	Hanover Street		Early 19th century		53.4028°N 2.9849°W	
Railings, plinth walls, gates, piers and steps at Church of St Luke	Berry Street		1829–33	The railings, plinth walls, gates, piers and steps around the Church of St Luke were erected towards the end of the construction of the church itself. They were designed in Gothic-style by John Foster Jnr, the church architect's son. The railings extend all the way around the church, with the sloping nature of the site requiring flanking steps on the Berry Street side.	53.4016°N 2.9743°W	
Nos. 1 to 10	Gambier Terrace		c. 1836		53.3979°N 2.9707°W	
Liverpool Medical Institution	Mount Pleasant		1836–37	Nos. 114 and 116.	53.4033°N 2.9690°W	
Royal Insurance Building, Queen Avenue	Queen Avenue		1837–39	Nos. 16 and 18.	53.4068°N 2.9901°W	
Church of St Francis Xavier	Salisbury Street		1845–49		53.4134°N 2.9698°W	
The Albany	Old Hall Street		1856	The Albany was designed by James Kellaway Colling and constructed from brick with stone dressing. It is three storeys tall and originally provided both office and warehouse space, which has created a contrast between the utilitarian nature of the sides of the building and the detailed decoration of the front. The front itself features arched windows with keystones and carved ornaments as well as a carved frieze and modillioned cornice. The building's courtyard is a noted component of the building and features two iron bridges.	53.4087°N 2.9928°W	
Wapping Dock Warehouse	Wapping		1856		53.3970°N 2.9863°W	
Church of St Vincent de Paul	St James Street		1856–57		53.3969°N 2.9789°W	
Main Bridewell	Cheapside		1857–59	The Main Bridewell, designed by John Weightman in classical-style, was built to replace ten district bridewells in the city centre of Liverpool. The building is constructed from brick, with Flemish bond brickwork on the front and English bond brickwork on the rear and side. The building forms a quadrangle around a central yard with offices in the front block and cells along the sides and rear.	53.4093°N 2.9869°W	
William Brown Library and Museum	William Brown Street		1857–60		53.4100°N 2.9811°W	
Municipal Buildings	Dale Street		1860–66		53.4084°N 2.9862°W	
Playhouse Theatre	Williamson Square		1865		53.4064°N 2.9825°W	
Wellington Column	William Brown Street		1865		53.4096°N 2.9788°W	
No. 16	Cook Street		1866		53.4062°N 2.9890°W	
Fowler's Building	Victoria Street		1866–69	Nos. 3 to 9 (odd)	53.4068°N 2.9884°W	
Walker Art Gallery	William Brown Street		1874–77		53.4101°N 2.9797°W	
Picton Reading Room and Hornby Library	William Brown Street		1875–79		53.4098°N 2.9803°W	
Steble Fountain	William Brown Street		1879		53.4096°N 2.9792°W	
Sessions House	William Brown Street		1882–84		53.4101°N 2.9790°W	
Swedish Seaman's Church (Gustav Adolf Church)	Park Lane		1883–84		53.3996°N 2.9844°W	
Adelphi Bank	Castle Street		1892	The Co-operative Bank Building, formerly known as the Adelphi Bank, was designed by William Douglas Caroe. The building is four storeys tall with an attic and was constructed above a granite base from red and yellow sandstone. The building is noted for its decorative details including the bronze entrance doors, which feature reliefs by Stirling Lee and depict various pairs of famous friends (e.g. Achilles and Patroclus, Castor and Pollux).	53.4060°N 2.9909°W	
Albion House	James Street		1896–98	No. 30.	53.4046°N 2.9924°W	
College of Technology and Museum Extension	Byrom Street		1896–1909	The College of Technology and Museum Extension was designed by Edward William Mountford in classical-style. The building is three storeys tall with a basement and is notable for its convex façade on the Byrom Street side. The second floor incorporates an Ionic colonnade with entablature and balustraded parapet. The sculptures are by Frederick William Pomeroy. Later known as the James Pearson Building.	53.4100°N 2.9820°W	
National Westminster Bank	Castle Street		1899–1902	The National Westminster Bank Building was designed by Norman Shaw. The building is four storeys tall with a ground floor mezzanine and attic. It is constructed from granite of alternating yellow and grey stripes and has terracotta window dressings and a slate roof. The building is noted for its interior with a central round lantern, frieze, cornice and pilasters.	53.4064°N 2.9913°W	
Royal Insurance Building, North John Street	North John Street		1903	Nos. 1 to 9 (odd).	53.4074°N 2.9893°W	
Tower Building	Water Street (north side)		1906	No. 22.	53.4066°N 2.9943°W	
Orleans House	Edmund Street		1907		53.4099°N 2.9932°W	
Port of Liverpool Building	Georges Pier Head		1907	Later the offices of the Mersey Docks and Harbour Board.	53.4045°N 2.9954°W	
Vines Public House	Lime Street		1907	Nos. 81 to 87 (odd).	53.4058°N 2.9781°W	
Cunard Building	Georges Pier Head		1913–16		53.4051°N 2.9954°W	
Memorial to the Heroes of the Marine Engine Room	St Nicholas Place		1916		53.4061°N 2.9981°W	
India Buildings	Water Street		1924–30	An office building and shopping arcade designed by Herbert J. Rowse and Arnold Thornely for the shipping firm Alfred Holt and Company. It is faced in Portland stone, and is in seven storeys, with a mezzanine and a basement. It has a front of 13 bays, with five bays on the sides. External details include a statue of Neptune, a giant pilastrade with an entablature, and balustraded balconies. Inside is a coffered barrel vaulted ceiling, Ionic columns, three domes, and rows of shops with identical fronts. Grading raised from II to II* on 5 November 2013.	53.4062°N 2.9928°W	
Martins Bank Building	Water Street		1927–32	Nos. 4 and 6.	53.4070°N 2.9924°W	
Philharmonic Hall	Hope Street		1937–39	Including detached poster-piers to south-west and north-west.	53.4012°N 2.9697°W	

== See also ==
Architecture of Liverpool
