= British & Foreign Marine =

Defunct British insurance company

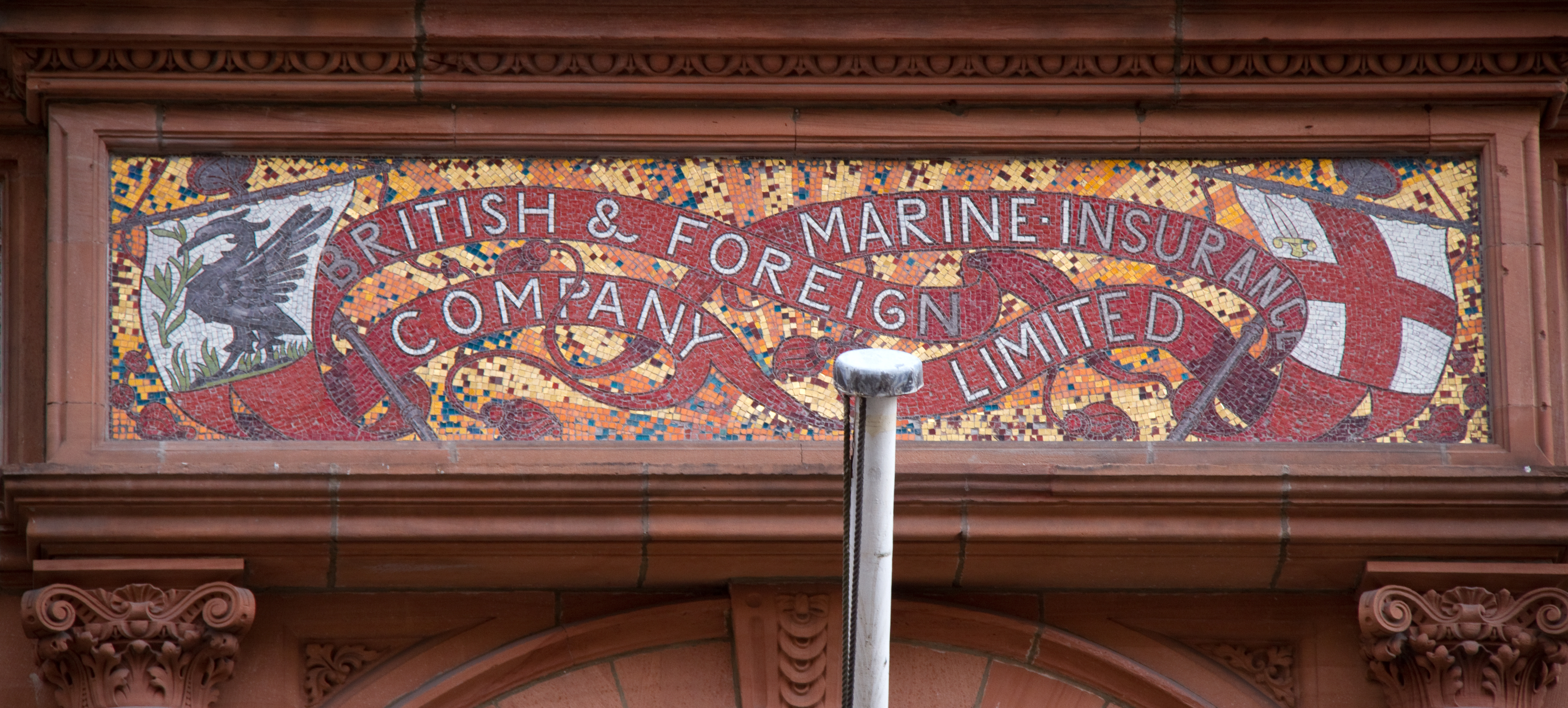
- Company mosaic

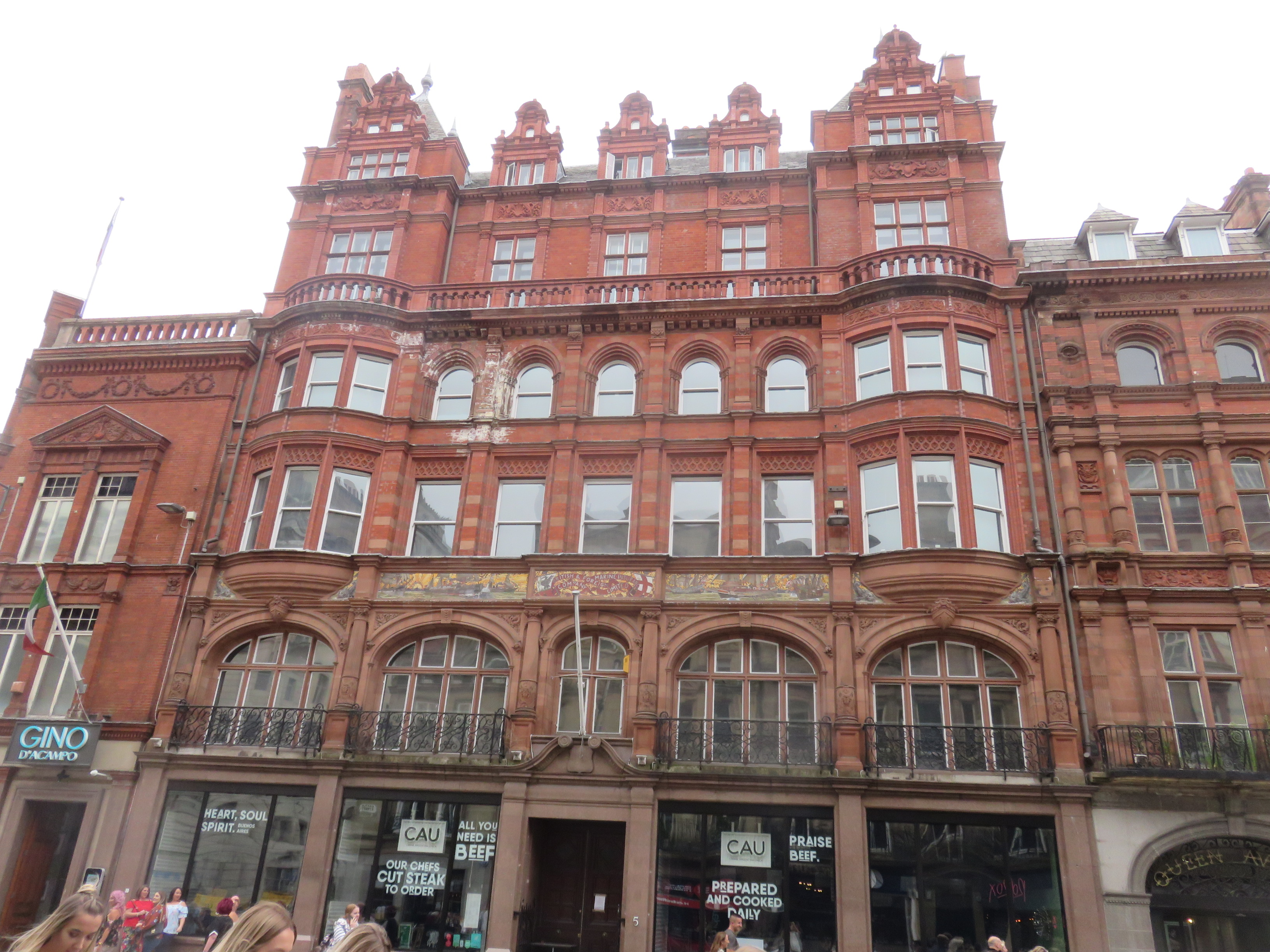
- Former head office in Castle Street, Liverpool
- Industry: Insurance
- Founded: 1863; 163 years ago
- Defunct: 1909
- Fate: Acquired by Royal Insurance
- Successor: RSA Insurance Group
- Headquarters: Liverpool, England

British & Foreign Marine was one of the leading marine insurers in Liverpool, England in the second half of the nineteenth century, at one point claiming to have the largest reserves of any marine insurer in Europe. It was acquired by Royal Insurance in 1909 but continued as an independent entity for several decades.

== History ==
=== Formation ===
By the end of the 1850s, Liverpool ship owners were again becoming frustrated at the premiums being charged by London insurers. The American Civil War was an additional irritant with London insurers delaying premiums to force up rates. A number of private partnerships were established in Liverpool including the firm of Dale & Ryrie. This firm was incorporated as the British & Foreign Marine Insurance in January 1863. The manager and underwriter of British & Foreign Marine was Richard Norris Dale, a local marine broker, who continued in that role for nearly thirty years; Thomas Chilton, a local shipowner, was appointed chairman, a position he held until 1900. The firm's coverage was confined to cargo and freight but there was pressure from clients to provide cover for hulls as well. This was resisted by some shareholders and in March 1863 a separate company, The Mercantile Marine, was formed for hull insurance.

=== Rapid growth ===
The pace of growth was rapid, attributed to "An acknowledged skilful management earned an early success for this undertaking". Only two weeks after formation, it was agreed that underwriting agencies would be established overseas; by the end of the first year there were 15 agencies, spread around the world. The first year's premium income placed it second in the table of marine insurers. half the premium being in Liverpool. Success was short-lived for less than two years from its formation, the 1864 Calcutta cyclone threatened the solvency of British & Marine. Although all claims were paid, the Company decided to re-form itself as a new company of the same name in 1867. By 1873 there were 50 overseas agencies rising to 100 by 1895. By 1877, British & Foreign Marine had displaced Thames & Mersey at the head of the marine premium league able. In 1887 the Company moved its head office from Exchange Building to a new office in Castle Street. The following year, the Chairman informed the AGM that after its first 25 years the shareholders had received £935,000 in dividends for their initial investment of £100,000. The commissioned new offices in Castle Street in Liverpool in 1889. The new building was designed by Grayson and Ould, built in red brick with stone finishes and was officially opened in January 1890.

=== London merger ===
British & Foreign Marine had long had difficulty in growing the business of the London office and in 1890 it received an approach from Universal Marine Insurance. This was a leading London insurance company, established for thirty years and chaired by Sir John Lubbock. The next year, British & Foreign Marine bought Universal Marine and merged the two London businesses into the former head office of Universal, at 31 Cornhill. Apart from strengthening the London operation, the acquisition brought additional overseas agencies, especially in Australasia. In 1891 Dale retired, having run British & Foreign Marine since its inception; his deputy, John Davies, succeeded him providing continuity. Next year, the Chairman announced that British & Foreign Marine had the largest reserves of any marine insurer in Europe.

=== New York problems ===
Restrictions on U.S. companies trading with foreign entities were impacting on the New York business. This was met by the formation of a U.S. subsidiary in 1896, the American & Foreign Marine Insurance Co., becoming the largest of the British companies operating in New York. The three operating hubs therefore became Liverpool, London and New York. Unfortunately, New York ran into difficulties: bad winters produced losses in 1898 and heavy losses in 1899. The Board instructed the New York management to reduce its exposure and profitability steadily improved over the following decade.

=== Falling income in 1900s ===
By the end of the nineteenth century, British & Foreign and Thames & Mersey were jointly the two largest marine insurerers by annual premium income. However, very competitive conditions existed in the early twentieth century and British & Foreign Marine's underwriting became more selective. As a result, premium income fell by 44 per cent in the ten years to 1907 in contrast to its largest competitors. In 1901, British & Foreign Marine, Thames & Mersey and Union Marine had broadly similar premium income; but by 1906, British and Foreign had fallen substantially behind the other two. However, it did remain profitable through this period.

=== Acquisition by Royal Insurance ===
The 1890s had seen the amalgamations of a number of well-established marine companies but it was not until 1905, when Alliance Assurance took over its affiliate Alliance Marine, that a fire and accident company had acquired a marine insurer. In 1909 the Royal Insurance acquired British & Foreign Marine for a consideration of £1,675,000. In the 46 years of its existence, the shareholders received dividends of £2.2m on the initial investment of £100,000. The Royal manager described the purchase of British and Foreign as "a really magnificent, profit earning association" The Royal went on to buy the Liverpool and London Globe Insurance in 1919, the latter having previously bought Thames & Mersey Marine in 1911. Each of these Liverpool companies continued to function entirely separately. In 1921, the company was involved in the important legal case of British & Foreign Marine Insurance v. Gaunt when Lord Birkenhead held that the company was not liable "for such damage as is inevitable from ordinary wear and tear ... is not within the policies". The case established a key principle of marine case law which has been upheld for over a century.

=== Inter-war trading ===
The first two years of Second World War saw “losses of astronomic proportions” but the adjustment of premiums eventually led to a surplus for the whole war. However, the post-war shipping recession and overcapacity in marine insurance led to increasing care in taking on new business. Between 1920 and 1923 premium income halved and there were further falls by 1926. The depressed conditions continued through the 1930s but only occasionally did one of the three hubs make an underwriting loss, and only in 1937 did the company as a whole lose money on underwriting. In 1939 Royal decided to integrate the various marine subsidiaries operating in New York. The integration continued with the operations of the three marine subsidiaries in Liverpool and then London, being merged in 1942. However, the British & Foreign Marine company was still used to write business and was separately managed until 1967.

=== Closure ===
The British & Foreign Marine accounts showed an underwriting loss of £33m in 1992 and all the U.K. marine and aviation business was transferred to its parent company, leaving only operations in France and Denmark. These were disposed of in 2004 and British & Foreign Marine ceased trading in 2012; it was dissolved in 2018. A war memorial commemorating members of staff who died in the First World War was relocated to the National Memorial Arboretum and re-dedicated by the Rector of Liverpool on 3 September 1999.
