= Thames & Mersey Marine Insurance =

Largest pure marine insurer in U K at the start of the C20th century

- Company type: Insurance company
- Industry: Insurance
- Founded: 1860
- Defunct: 1911 but name continued to be used until the 1960s
- Fate: Merged
- Successor: Royal Insurance
- Headquarters: Liverpool, England
- Products: Marine insurance

Thames & Mersey Marine Insurance was a large British marine insurance company that operated from 1860 until it was acquired in 1911, but the name continued to be used until the 1960s.

== History ==
Before 1860, Liverpool’s marine insurance rested on local syndicates, Lloyd’s of London or a small number of London companies. In 1859, John Towne Danson, a Liverpool barrister, published a pamphlet asserting that Liverpool had 50% of UK exports but most of its insurance was written elsewhere. He proposed a new joint stock company, Mersey Marine Insurance Company with £500,000 capital. A search for an experienced London underwriter to head the Company uncovered a similar marine proposal in London, headed by a Mr S. Sleigh. It was agreed that the two companies should be merged and a prospectus was published for the Thames & Mersey Marine Insurance.

The capital was allocated as to London 45 per cent, Liverpool 30 per cent and Manchester 25 per cent. The company’s status was changed two years after its formation when it became possible for insurance companies to obtain limited liability under the Companies Act 1862. The Liverpool office became increasingly dominant and, by 1870, it accounted for 59 per cent of combined premium income. The Thames & Mersey Insurance Company was slow to appoint overseas underwriting agents but Liverpool took the initiative in 1870 by appointing an agent in San Francisco. As the overseas coverage increased, each of the UK offices developed its own area of interest.

In 1911 Liverpool and London Globe Insurance, a fire insurer, bought Thames & Mersey for £900,000. The Thames and Mersey was then the largest pure marine insurer, but its profitability had come under pressure: its ratio of claims and expenses to premium income had risen from 70 per cent in 1901 to a loss-making 102 per cent in 1906. Following the acquisition, a single Board for Thames and Mersey was established in Liverpool with London and Manchester as branches. The Liverpool office was at Liverpool and London Chambers in Liverpool, while the London branch office was at Royal Exchange Buildings and the Manchester branch office was at 2, Old Bank Street, St Ann's Square, Manchester. In 1919 Liverpool and London merged with its local competitor, Royal Insurance.

The Thames and Mersey seemed to operate as an autonomous entity at least until 1960, when the company’s official history ended. Its archives for the period until 1961 are deposited at the Liverpool Record Office.
