= Royal Insurance Building, London =

Edwardian office building in London, England

Royal Insurance Building
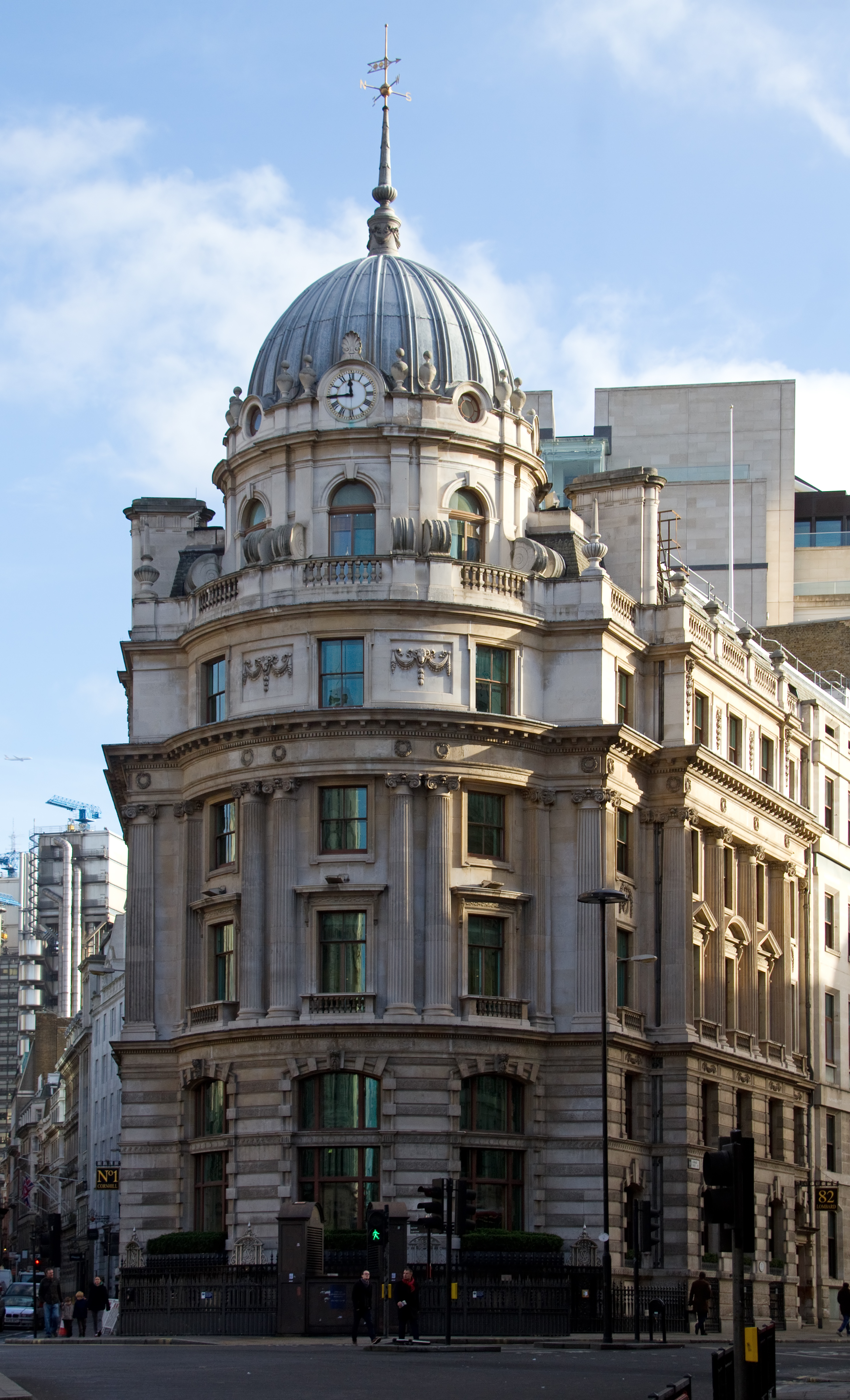
- Royal Insurance Building

General information
- Type: Office
- Architectural style: Neoclassical
- Location: London, England
- Coordinates: 51°30′48″N 0°05′18″W
- Completed: 1905

Design and construction
- Architect: John Macvicar Anderson

Listed Building – Grade II
- Official name: 82, LOMBARD STREET EC3, 1, CORNHILL EC3
- Designated: 05 June 1972
- Reference no.: 1286711

The Royal Insurance Building or 1 Cornhill is a Grade II listed Edwardian office building in the City of London. Built for the Liverpool & London & Globe Insurance company. It occupies a prominent triangular plot overlooking Bank Junction, between Cornhill and Lombard Street.

== History and description ==
The Liverpool Fire & Life Insurance was founded in 1836 in Liverpool. In the 1850s and 60s the company acquired a number of regional insurers. Notably among them was the acquisition of the Globe Insurance Company of London in 1864, giving both the final name and the premises at No. 1 Cornhilll. The current building was constructed in 1905 as the headquarters for the company, designed by John Macvicar Anderson in a Neoclassical style.

The Liverpool & London & Globe Insurance was later acquired by Royal Insurance in 1919, who would move into the building at No. 1 Cornhill and remain their until merging with Sun Alliance in 1996. The building was refurbished between 1978 and 1979 by Howard Lobb, Ratcliffe, Leather & Partners.

The building is built of Portland stone in the Ionic order. The dome on the south-west corner extending into Bank Junction a significant accent to the space. The interior contains a large former banking hall with marble columns and walling.
