= Royal Insurance Building, Liverpool =

Listed building in Liverpool, England

Royal Insurance Building
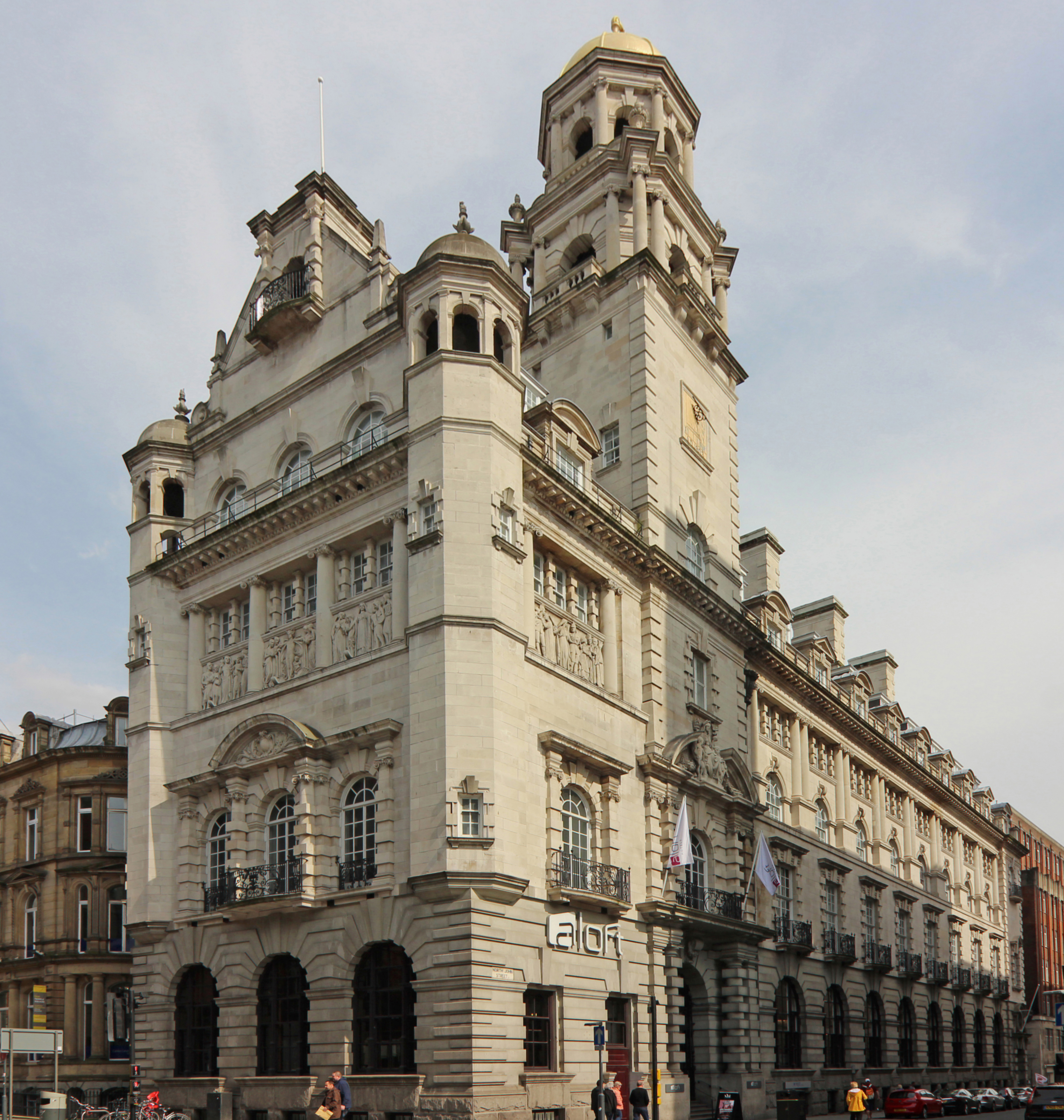
- Royal Insurance Building

General information
- Architectural style: Neo-Baroque
- Address: 1–9 North John Street, Liverpool, England
- Coordinates: 53°24′27″N 2°59′21″W
- Year(s) built: 1896–1903
- Client: Royal Insurance Company

Design and construction
- Architect(s): James F. Doyle
- Designations

Listed Building – Grade II*
- Official name: Royal Insurance Building
- Designated: 28 June 1952
- Reference no.: 1070582

The Aloft Liverpool Hotel, formerly the Royal Insurance Building, is a historic building located at 1-9 North John Street, Liverpool, Merseyside, England. It was built as the head office of the Royal Insurance company.

== History ==
The building was constructed between 1896 and 1903 as the head office of the Royal Insurance Company (since 1996 part of the RSA Insurance Group). The design was the result of a competition won by James F. Doyle in 1895. The assessor for the competition was Norman Shaw, who was retained as an advisory architect for the project, but it is uncertain what part he played in it. The building is constructed around a steel frame and is the earliest example of this type of construction in the United Kingdom. It ceased to be used by the late 1980s, and its condition deteriorated so much that it was placed on the Buildings at Risk Register of English Heritage.

In 2013 its freehold was bought by Liverpool City Council, and it was converted into a hotel. It opened as the Aloft Liverpool Hotel on 29 October 2014. At the 20 years of the register, the renovation of the Royal Insurance Building was named as one of the successful rescues.

In 2021 Fragrance Group, a Singapore-based property business, bought the property together with the freehold title and continued to operate the hotel as Aloft Hotel by Marriott.

== Architecture ==
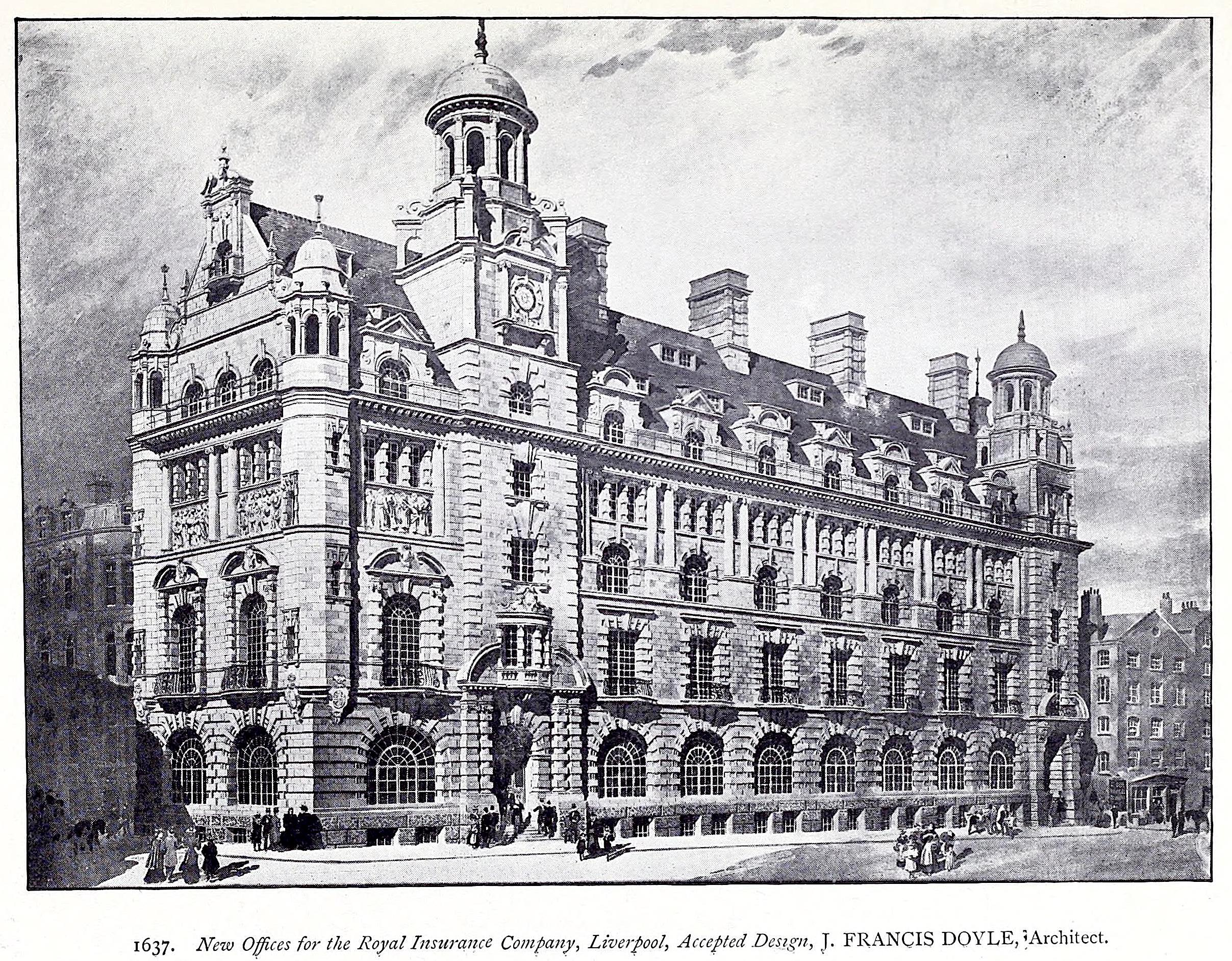
Perspective drawing of the building.

Constructed around a steel frame, the building is in Portland stone, with a granite basement and ground floor. Its architecture is described as "sumptuous Neo-Baroque on the grandest scale". The building is in four storeys with a basement and an attic. Its long front on North John Street has eleven bays, with three bays on Dale Street. The ground floor and basement are rusticated. The windows are three-light sash windows with round heads. Those on the first floor have Gibbs surrounds and iron balconies. On the second and third floors the windows are recessed behind a Doric colonnade and entablature. In the attic are dormers. Some of these have architraves, keystones, and either segmental or triangular pediments; the others are flat-topped and contain casement windows. The entrance is on the second bay from the left in North John Street. The doorway has Doric columns and is round-headed. The first floor contains a round-headed window surrounded by a portico with a broken segmental pediment containing carved figures. Above this bay rises a three-stage campanile bearing an octagonal cupola with a gilded dome. On the Dale Street façade is a Venetian window. The second floor contains a frieze designed by C. J. Allen depicting themes relating to insurance. At the corners of this front are octagonal turrets with cupolas and finials. Between the turrets at attic level are three round-headed windows with rusticated Ionic pilasters, an entablature, and an iron balcony.

The interior contains the former General Office on the ground floor which, because of the steel frame, is free from any columns. Above this, the former Board Room has a tunnel vault. Both rooms are decorated with stucco in 17th-century style. The building is recorded in the National Heritage List for England as a designated Grade II* listed building.

There is an earlier Royal Insurance Building, dating from 1839, on nearby Queen Avenue, also Grade II* listed.

== See also ==
- Architecture of Liverpool
- Grade II* listed buildings in Liverpool – City Centre
- Grade II* listed buildings in Merseyside
