= John George Weightman =

French language scholar, translator, essayist and reviewer (1915–2004)

- Born: 29 November 1915; Black Callerton, Northumberland
- Died: 14 August 2004 (aged 88); London, England
- Education: King's College; University of Poitiers
- Occupations: Scholar; Translator; Essayist; Literary critic
- Notable work: On Language and Writing (1947); The Concept of the Avant-Garde: Explorations in Modernism (1973); The Cat Sat on the Mat: Language and the Absurd (2002); Reading the Bible in the Run-up to Death (2003); Memoirs of a Language Freak (2004)
- Spouse: Doreen Wade

John George Weightman (29 November 1915 – 14 August 2004) was an English scholar, translator, essayist, and reviewer best known for his work as Professor of French Language and Literature at Westfield College of the University of London, his wartime broadcasting with the BBC French Service, and his lengthy career as a literary critic. He is remembered as a humanist and descriptive critic who emphasized clarity, language, and had a skeptical but engaged approach to modern intellectual fashions.

== Early life and education ==
John George Weightman was born on 29 November 1915 in Black Callerton, Northumberland, as the son of a coal-miner. He attended Hexham Grammar School, where a teacher first sparked his interest in French, and went on to read French at King’s College, Newcastle (then part of Durham University), graduating in 1936. He spent his years from 1936 to 1939 perfecting his French at the University of Poitiers.

== Career ==
=== BBC and wartime work ===
In 1939, Weightman joined the BBC French Service as a translator and announcer. During the Second World War, he broadcast to occupied France, at times reading news while General Charles de Gaulle was present on the same program, where his clear French and voice made him valuable in broadcasts that carried hope and coded messages. After the war, he continued with the BBC on reporting and goodwill tours in France before moving into academia.

=== Academic career ===
Weightman entered academic life in 1950 as a lecturer in French language and literature at the University of London (King’s College), was promoted to Reader, and in 1963 was appointed Professor of French Language and Literature at Westfield College. He held this position until his retirement (he was later professor emeritus).

=== Writing, criticisms, and translations ===
Alongside his academic work, Weightman was a prolific essayist, reviewer and cultural critic. He wrote for numerous periodicals including The Observer, Times Literary Supplement, Encounter, New Statesman, The New York Review of Books and others, and was admired for close, text-based criticism.

With his wife Doreen (married 1940), he produced several careful translations from French, including important works by Claude Lévi-Strauss and others; the couple collaborated on translations of anthropological and literary works.

=== Major works ===
Weightman’s books include On Language and Writing (1947) and his study The Concept of the Avant-Garde: Explorations in Modernism (1973). In later life he published books showing his long interest in language and thought, such as The Cat Sat on the Mat: Language and the Absurd (2002), Reading the Bible in the Run-up to Death (2003) and Memoirs of a Language Freak (2004).

== Honors ==
For his services to French culture, Weightman was made a Commandeur of the Ordre des Palmes Académiques.

== Personal life and death ==
Weightman married Doreen Wade in 1940 and they had a son and a daughter. Doreen predeceased him in 1985. Weightman died in London on 14 August 2004 of cancer at the age of 88.
