= Adelphi Bank =

Listed building in Liverpool, England

Adelphi Bank Building
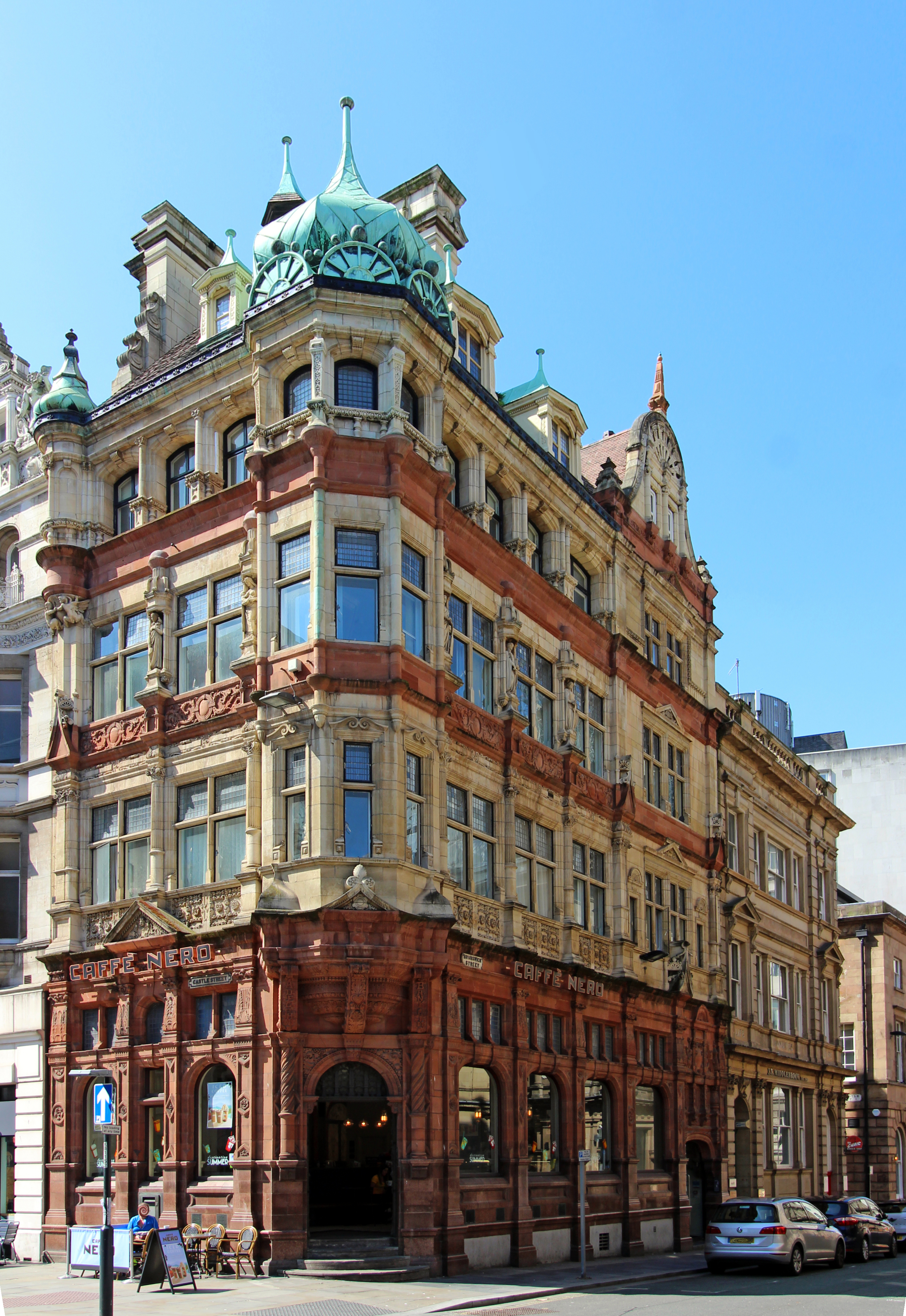
- The building in 2018
- Interactive map of the Adelphi Bank Building area

General information
- Type: Bank
- Architectural style: French European Renaissance
- Location: Castle Street, Liverpool, England
- Coordinates: 53.40601°N 2.99090°W
- Construction started: 1890
- Completed: 1892

Technical details
- Floor count: 4

Design and construction
- Architect: W. D. Caröe
- Designations

Listed Building – Grade II*
- Official name: 38, Castle Street and 1, Brunswick Street
- Designated: 14 March 1975
- Reference no.: 1356311

The Adelphi Bank Building is a 19th-century Grade II* listed former bank located on Castle Street in Liverpool, England. The architect was William Douglas Caröe and the building was completed in 1892 for the now defunct Adelphi Bank the building's architecture has been described as a mixture of French European Renaissance with Nordic and Eastern European themes. At present, the ground floor is a branch of the Caffè Nero coffee house.

== Doors ==
The building's bronze doors were designed by Thomas Stirling Lee and depict scenes of male friendship from history and mythology.

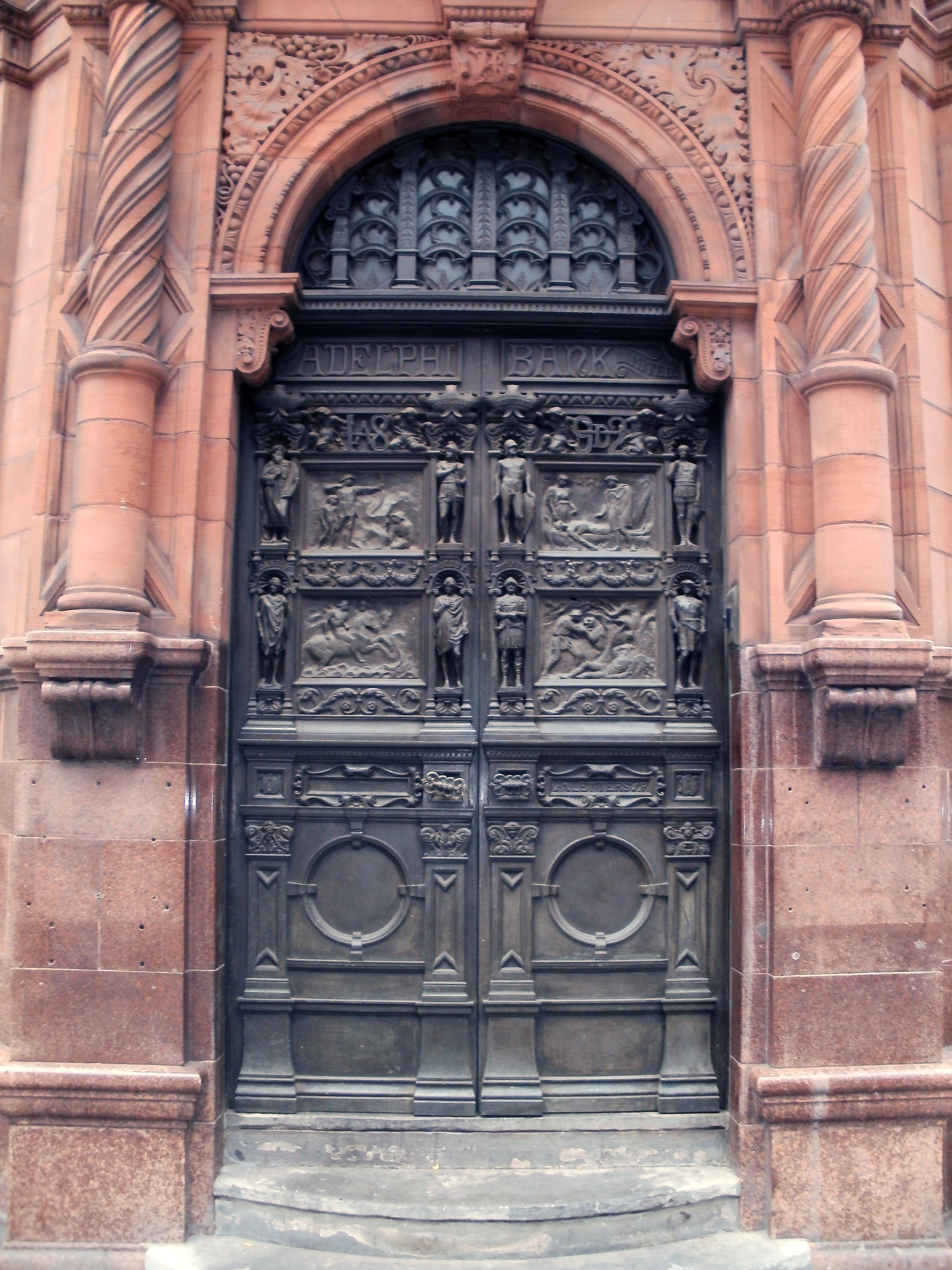
Entrance

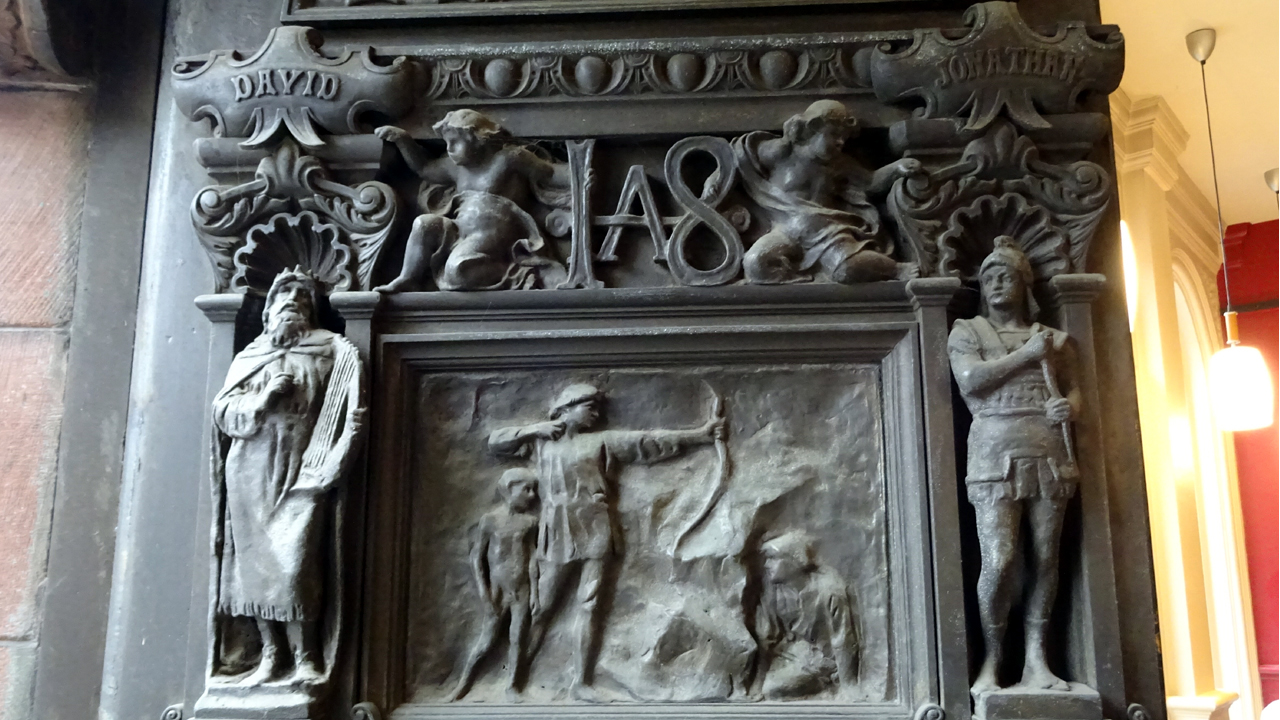
David and Johnathan

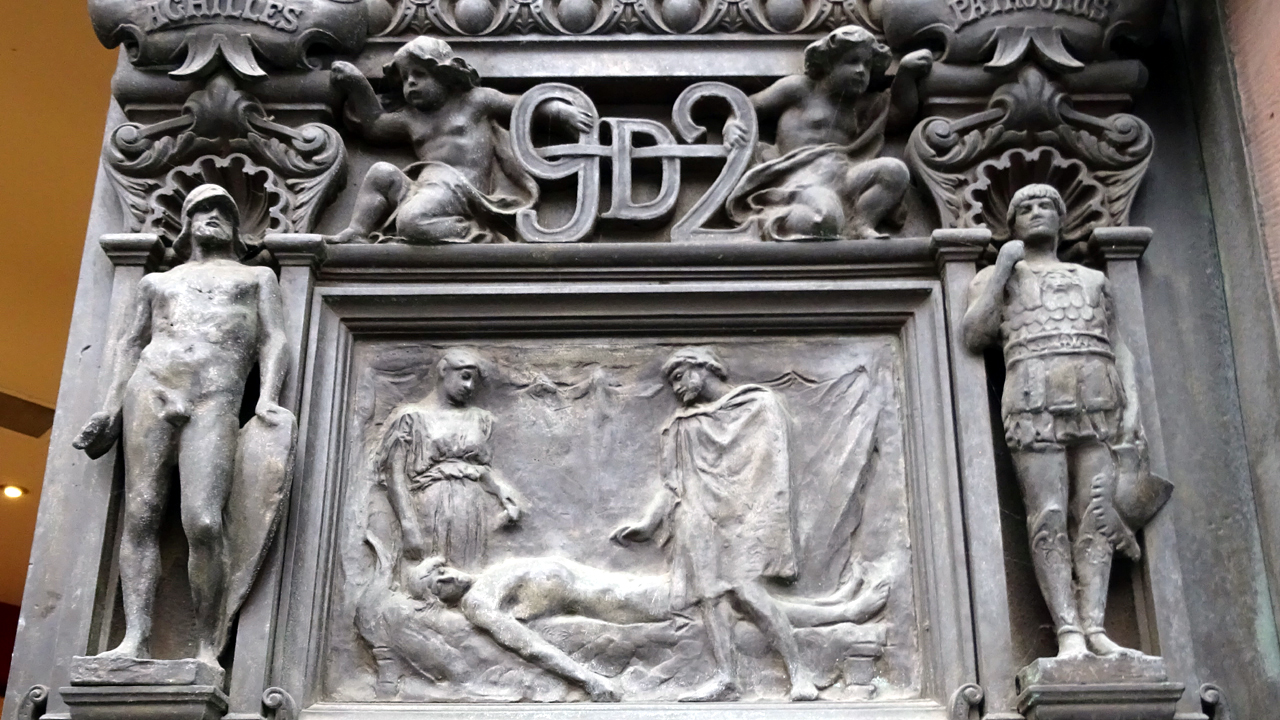
Achilles and Patroclus

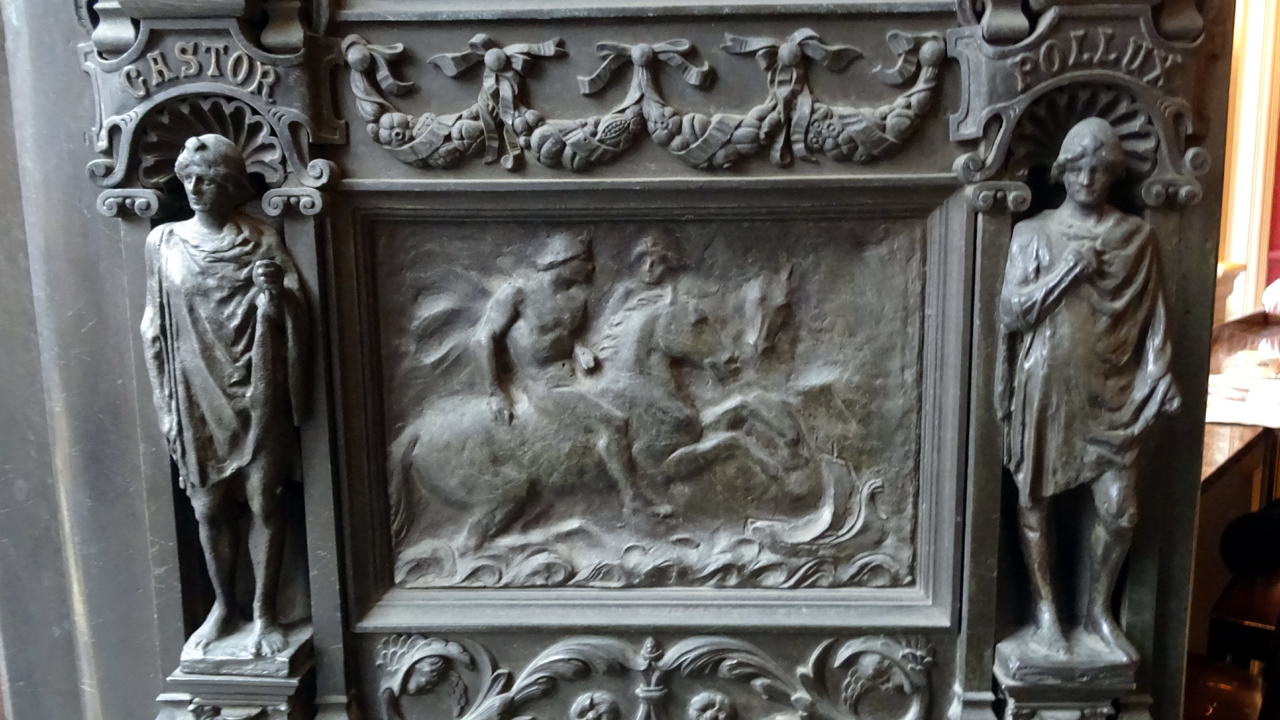
Castor and Pollux

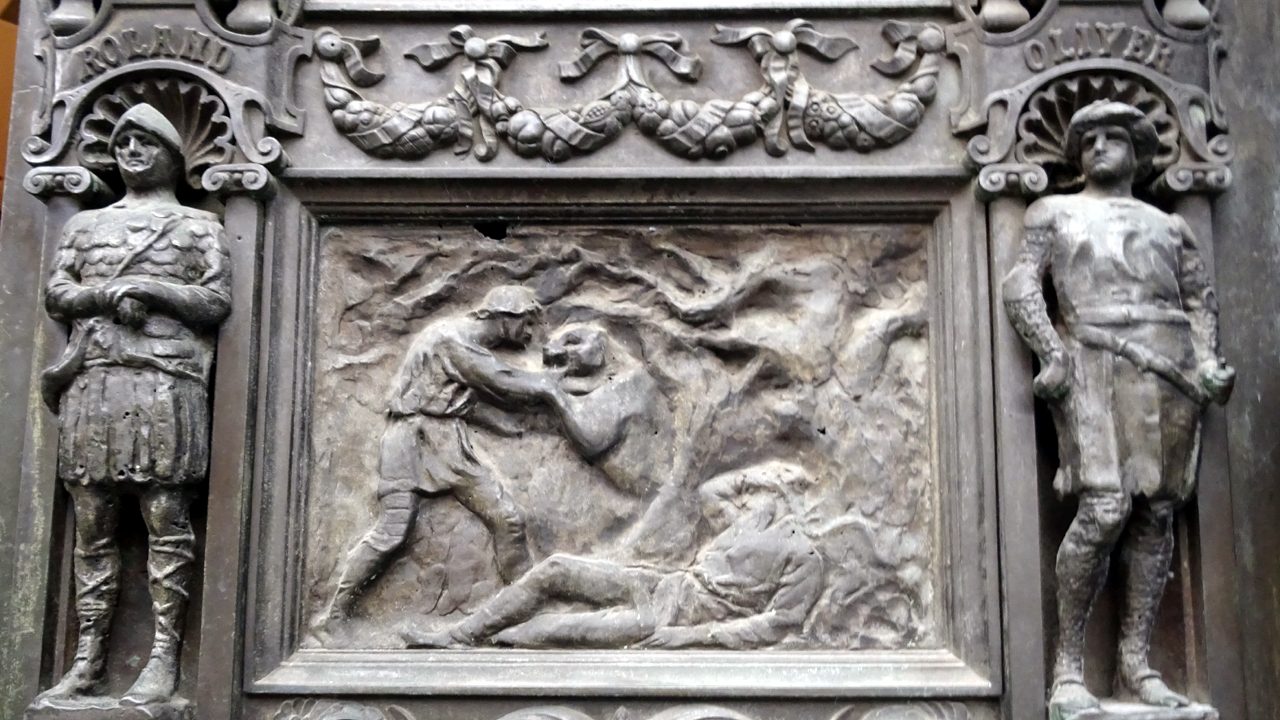
Roland and Oliver

== See also ==
- Architecture of Liverpool
- Grade II* listed buildings in Liverpool – City Centre
