= London and Lancashire Insurance =

English insurance company (1861–1961)

- Formerly: London and Lancashire Fire Insurance Company (1861–1920)
- Founded: 12 October 1861
- Defunct: 1962
- Fate: Acquired by Royal Insurance
- Headquarters: 155 Leadenhall Street, City of London

The London and Lancashire Insurance Company Limited was founded in 1861, and had become one of the U.K.'s leading fire insurers by the end of the 19th century. A series of acquisitions in the early 20th century took the company into accident and marine insurance, as well as life assurance, making it a leading composite insurer. Following a period of consolidation in the industry, London and Lancashire was acquired by Royal Insurance in 1962.

== History ==
=== The first year ===
The June 1861 Tooley Street fire was the greatest since 1666, and led to £1.25 million of claims. It was believed to be the stimulus for Alexander Hamilton Gunn, a London merchant and company promoter, to start a new fire insurance company. In August, only two months after the fire, he assembled prominent London and Lancashire businessmen and merchants; and a prospectus for the London and Lancashire Fire Insurance was published in October. Directors included Francis William Russell, MP for Limerick City, one of the prime movers in the City of London, and Francis Braun of Liverpool merchants Blessig Braun; shortly after, the connection with Gunn ceased. Capital of £200,000 was raised, and by February 1862 the company was registered for business. The directors recruited Mr Clirehugh, the manager of the Queen Insurance Company, as general manager, based in London. (At the same time, London and Lancashire launched an abortive attempt to acquire the Queen Insurance Company). The Liverpool office appointed agencies in the north, and London did so in the south; almost immediately afterwards, the company showed its ambitions by appointing agents in Montreal, Melbourne, Paris and St Petersburg. The prospectus had confined itself to fire insurance; and one of the attractions of the failed bid for the Queen Insurance had been the latter's life assurance business. Instead, in May 1862, the directors resolved to form a parallel life company with a paid-up capital of £10,000. Although separate, it would be managed by Clirehugh. Thus, within a year of the initial meeting, London and Lancashire had raised capital, appointed agencies across Britain and several overseas cities, and launched a life assurance company. By 1865 the company had 500 agencies at home and abroad.

=== Early difficulties and the move to Liverpool ===
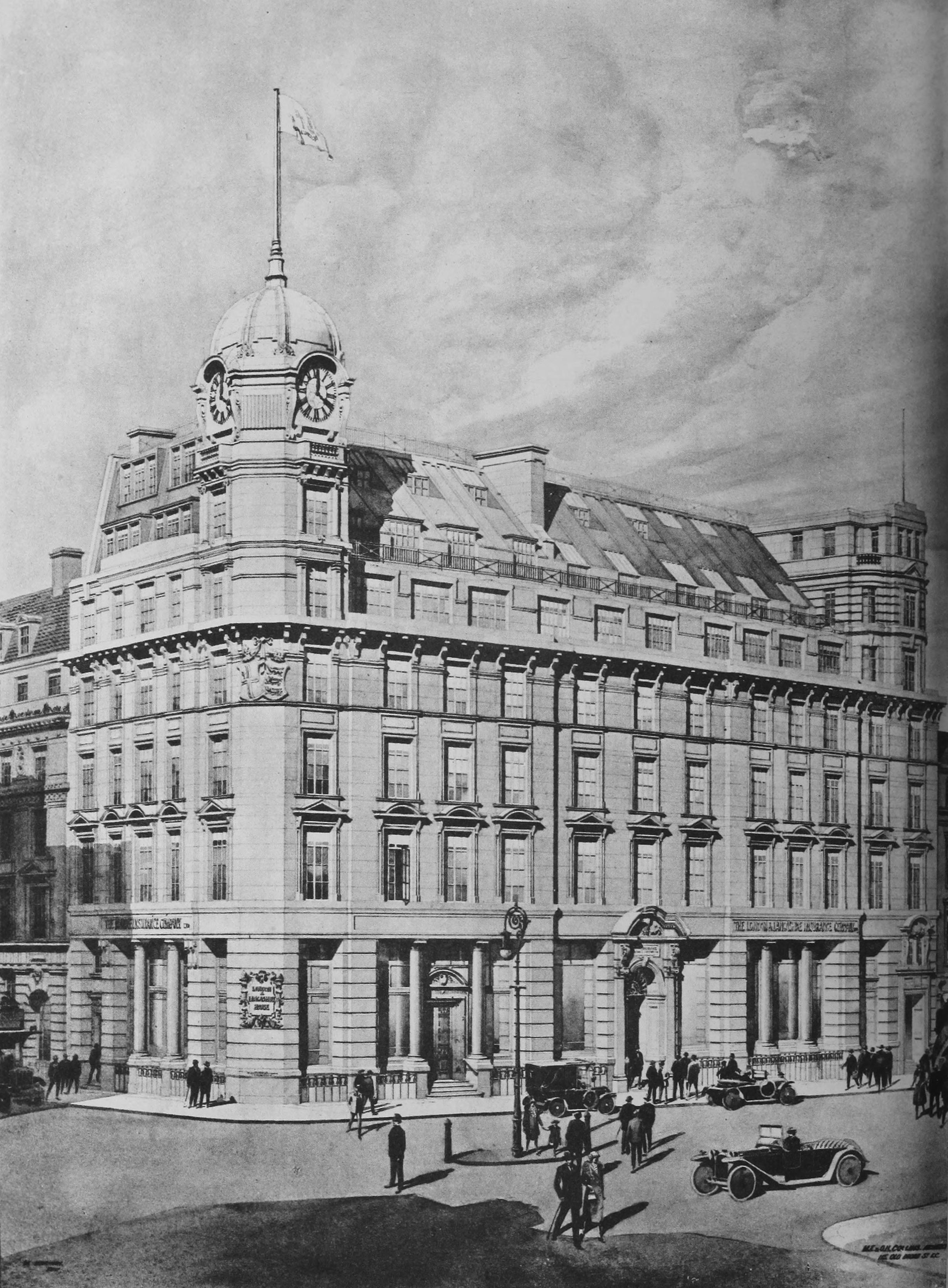
The 1913 head office at 155 Leadenhall, designed by Marcus Evelyn Collins.

Annual premium income increased rapidly, reaching £100,000 in 1864. However, expenses were heavy and the underwriting loss ratio increased from 37% in 1863 to 68% in 1865; reserves fell to only 11%. Worse was to follow in 1866. In May there was widespread financial panic after the collapse of Overend, Gurney and Company. In November there was the great fire of Yokohama, which cost the company £20,000. Total losses for the year were £126,000; and reserves were exhausted. The London Board wanted to call on the shareholders for additional capital, but the Liverpool directors strongly disagreed. Instead, it was agreed that London and Lancashire could borrow up to half its paid-up capital and take a loan from the life company. The Liverpool directors then challenged London's directors and forced a move of the head office and management to Liverpool. The life company stayed in London.

Eventually the company had to face up to its weakened reserve position, and in 1868 the shareholders faced a call of £1 a share. For 1867 and the four following years, the company paid no dividend. Business continued to expand and premium income doubled between 1867 and 1872; the loss ratio began to decline and by 1873 the reserves became positive again. The subsequent recovery and growth at London and Lancashire owed much to the 1874 appointment of Charles George Fothergill, previously Secretary to Royal Insurance, as Manager. More selective underwriting improved profitability, and additional capital was also raised from shareholders. After that, Fothergill embarked on a series of acquisitions, both at home and abroad. In 1879, London and Lancashire bought three U.S. companies including Safeguard Insurance of New York adding £80,000 to annual premium income of around £250,000. In the same year it also bought the fire business of London and Southwark Insurance, adding a further £100,000 to premiums. In the 1890s, companies were acquired in South Africa, Australia, Canada and South America. By 1897, premium income was £840,000 and reserves just short of £1 million. The USA accounted for half of the company's total premium income.

=== London and Lancashire becomes a composite ===
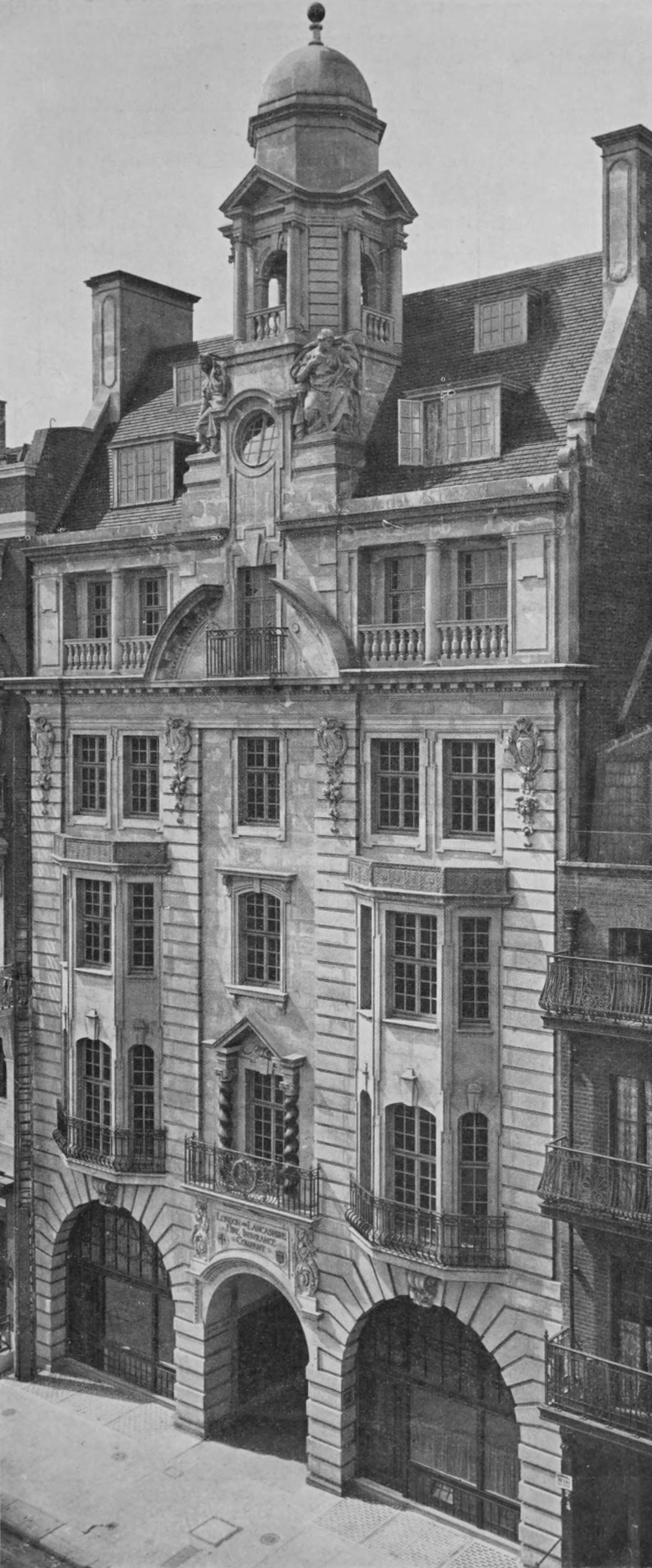
The west end branch at 59-60 Pall Mall, designed in 1906 by Sir Guy Dawber. It was destroyed during the Blitz.

Fothergill retired in 1898 and was succeeded by [Sir] Frederick Pascoe Rutter as general manager. Rutter had joined the London and Lancashire Insurance Company as an apprentice, aged 14, becoming head of the foreign department at the age of 26 and general manager and secretary of the company at 40. Rutter's contribution was to move London and Lancashire from a pure fire company to a composite insurer, establishing these new areas through acquisition. Almost immediately, London and Lancashire bought another three U.S. companies, the largest being the Orient of Hartford, Connecticut; its premiums of £265,000 helped London and Lancashire's premiums to pass £1 million in 1901. The company's involvement in accident insurance came with the 1901 purchase of Manchester's Equitable Fire and Accident Office. This was reinforced by the purchase of Scottish Employers and Accident Insurance in 1904 and Law Accident Assurance of London in 1907 – the latter's £300,000 premium making London and Lancashire one of the largest accident insurers in the country. The third front also came in 1907 with the purchase of Standard Marine Insurance of Liverpool. In 1912, London and Lancashire became a limited company with the power to transact life assurance and in 1919 bought the Law Union and Rock Insurance Company for that purpose. Law Union and Rock had itself been formed in 1909 by a merger between Law Union and Crown Insurance Company and Rock Life Assurance Company.

Insurance is subject to disasters. The 1906 San Francisco earthquake caused extensive fire damage; London and Lancashire bore the largest losses of the British companies: a net loss of £925,000. There were also significant losses from fire damage after the Valparaiso earthquake in the same year, and from the Great Baltimore Fire of 1904. Paradoxically, World War I was positive for the company as marine risks were borne by the government. Between 1914 and 1919 premiums for fire doubled to £3.3 million; marine rose tenfold to £2.2 million; accident 50 per cent to £1.2 million; and there was a £0.4 million surplus in the life fund.

Badge used by the company

The inter-war period brought mixed experiences. Premium income fell after the collapse of the 1920 boom, particularly the marine account. There was little in the way of acquisitions; the purchase of the Colonial Mutual Fire Insurance of Melbourne was an exception. Premiums gradually rose to a new record in 1929 and the company avoided any losses in the Wall Street crash of that year. The ensuing recession did cause a reduction in premiums at the beginning of the 1930s, but there was then a steady recovery. The UK business was helped both by the introduction of compulsory car insurance after the Road Traffic Act 1930 and by the housebuilding boom. As in the First World War, the government largely covered war damage in World War II. Helped by inflation, premium income rose substantially through the late 1940s and 1950s, reaching £35 million by 1959. However, margins were falling because of increased competition, especially in the USA. London and Lancashire had made no acquisitions since the 1920s. whereas other insurers were consolidating to achieve greater scale.

=== Acquisition by Royal Insurance ===
In December 1960 a merger with Royal Insurance, Britain's largest insurance group, was announced. In reality it was a takeover by Royal. Although London and Lancashire contributed £70 million to combined assets of £400 million, its underwriting profits were only £20,000 compared to Royal's £2 million. Officially, London and Lancashire was to keep its independent identity within Royal but according to Pugh's history of the Royal, the functions were quickly merged.

== Company histories ==
- After Fifty Years. London and Lancashire Insurance Company, 1912.
- Francis, E. V. London and Lancashire History: The History of the London and Lancashire Insurance Company Limited. Newman Neame Limited, 1962.
