= Liverpool & London & Globe Insurance =

Insurance company

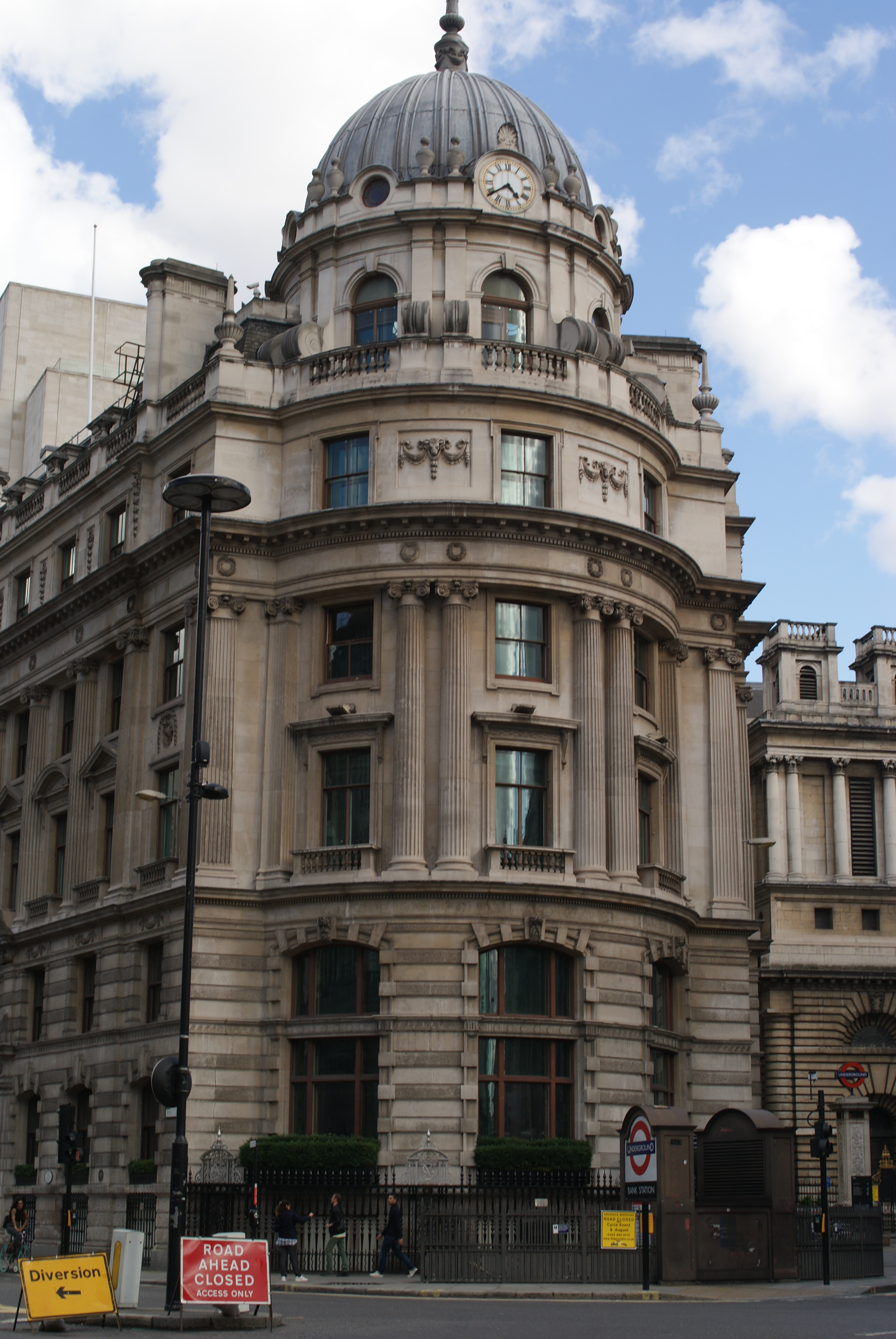
- Head office of the Liverpool, London & Globe Insurance at 1 Cornhill on Bank Junction in London, designed by John Macvicar Anderson and erected in 1905
- Formerly: Liverpool Fire & Life Insurance (1836–1847); Liverpool & London Fire and Life Assurance (1847–1864)
- Industry: Insurance
- Founded: 1836
- Defunct: 1919
- Fate: Merged into Royal Insurance

The Liverpool & London & Globe Insurance Company Limited was founded in 1836 in response to increased premiums from the London insurance companies. It expanded rapidly, at home and abroad, and after the acquisition of the London insurer, Globe Insurance, in 1864 it became the Liverpool & London & Globe Insurance Company. In 1919 it was acquired by another Liverpool firm, Royal Insurance. The enlarged entity merged with the Sun Alliance in 1996 to form the Royal & Sun Alliance Insurance Group.

== History ==
Liverpool and London Fire and Life Insurance Company Act 1847
- Act of Parliament
- Parliament of the United Kingdom
- Long title: An Act to change the Name of the Liverpool Fire and Life Insurance Company, and for other Purposes relating thereto.
- Citation: 10 & 11 Vict. c. cclxviii

Dates
- Royal assent: 22 July 1847
Other legislation
Repealed by	Liverpool and London and Globe Insurance Company's Act 1904

Status: Repealed

Text of statute as originally enacted

The genesis of the formation of the Liverpool and London lay in the antagonism between the two cities over the level of insurance premiums. When the London companies increased their rates in 1836 the response was immediate. The Liverpool Fire and Life Insurance Company was formed in April and opened for business in June. George Holt, a cotton broker, town councillor and one of the founders of the Bank of Liverpool was chairman, supported by 21 directors, all of whom had to live within 20 miles of the town hall. Within a month of opening, it wrote its first life assurance policy. In 1847, the company purchased the London, Edinburgh & Dublin Assurance Co. changing its name to Liverpool and London Fire and Life Assurance Company by the Liverpool and London Fire and Life Insurance Company Act 1847 (10 & 11 Vict. c. cclxviii). Around then a London office was established.

The 1850s and early 1860s was a period of expansion, first internationally then at home. In 1850 the Liverpool and London opened a New York office and entered the Canadian market. The following year the Australia & Colonial General Life Insurance and Annuity Co. was purchased and in 1853, agents were appointed in ten major cities including Hamburg, Bombay, Valparaíso and Shanghai. This contributed to the trebling of premiums between 1850 and 1855. The company started work building a new Liverpool office in 1856, completing it in 1858. The years 1857 and 1858 were difficult for fire insurance and in a five-year period, Liverpool and London used its strong reserves to make domestic acquisitions. These included the North of England Insurance; the fire business of the Bank of London and National Provincial Insurance Association; Sheffield, Rotherham and Chesterfield Insurance; the Monarch Life Assurance Office of London; the Unity Fire Association and the Leeds and Yorkshire Assurance. However, above all these was the acquisition in 1864 of the Globe Insurance Company of London with its prestigious No. 1 Cornhill building, leading to a final name change to the Liverpool & London & Globe Insurance.

By the mid-1860s, the Liverpool and London was the third largest insurance company in the US by premium income. Inevitably that left it exposed to substantial fire claims. A particular test was the Great Chicago Fire of 1871 where the company faced the second largest claims. There had been doubts as to whether the Liverpool would stand behind its US obligations but these were quashed as all claims were paid in full at a time when more than a third of insurance companies failed. The biggest test was come later from the 1906 San Francisco earthquake and consequent fires; the Liverpool and London lost $4.7 million without needing to draw on general reserves.

There had been no acquisitions since the Globe in 1864 but in a four-year period after the San Francisco earthquake, there were four purchases: the Manitoba (Canada); the Central; the Canadian Accident and the marine specialist Thames & Mersey Marine Insurance. The other significant domestic development was, in common with many other insurance companies, the opening of an accident department following the passing of the Workmen's Compensation Act 1906. In 1908, the Liverpool and London registered under the Companies Act and in 1910 it converted to a limited liability company.

In October 1919, the Royal Insurance Company, close Liverpool neighbours, bought the Liverpool and London to form the largest composite insurance company in the world. However, the Liverpool and London carried on as an independent entity. The official history, which continued to 1936, makes only a passing reference to the "Royal-Liverpool" group of companies and plots its independent activity. A later article on Liverpool's marine insurance referred to the administration of both concerns being co-ordinated in 1941 and fully integrated in 1962, In 1996 Royal Insurance merged with Sun Alliance to form Royal & Sun Alliance Insurance Group, shortened to RSA Insurance Group in 2008.
