= Royal Insurance =

English insurance company (1845–1996)

Royal Insurance Holdings plc

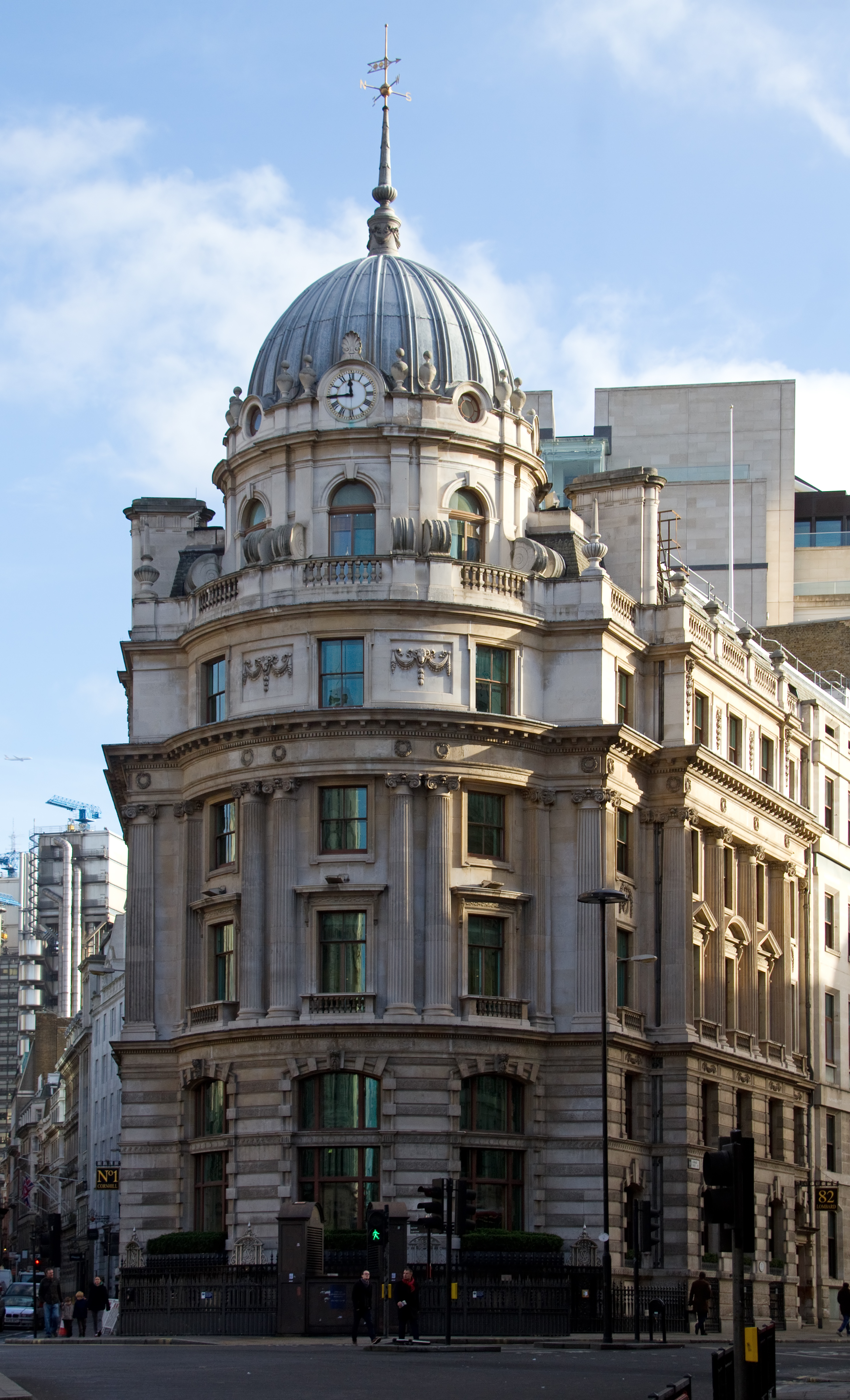
- 1 Cornhill in London
- Type: Public
- Industry: Insurance
- Founded: 1845; 181 years ago
- Defunct: 1996
- Fate: Merged with Sun Alliance
- Successor: RSA Insurance Group
- Headquarters: Liverpool, England

Royal Insurance Holdings plc was a large insurance business originating in Liverpool but based in London from the early 20th century. It merged with Sun Alliance in 1996 to form the Royal & Sun Alliance Insurance Group.

== History ==
=== Formation and early growth ===
On 11 March 1845, a group of prominent Liverpool merchants and businessmen formed a joint stock fire and life association called Royal, and within nine days they were advertising an offer to subscribe. It was constituted under a deed of settlement dated 31 May 1845. The business was intended to be almost entirely fire insurance for although the Royal was authorised to accept life assurance, that very much took second place. The first Charman was Josias Booker, a plantation owner and founder of Booker Brothers. Other directors included Charles Turner (MP), Chairman of the Mersey Docks and Harbour Board; John Bramley-Moore, merchant and future Lord Mayor of Liverpool; Thomas Horsfall, first chairman of the Liverpool Chamber of Commerce and later Mayor and MP; and Thomas Booth, chairman of N Waterhouse & Sons, leading cotton brokers.

The first general manager was recruited from Royal Exchange Assurance, Percy Matthew Dove, a qualified actuary. He led the company until his death in 1868 and, with the support of the directors, was responsible for the Royal’s early rapid growth. In September 1845, agents were appointed in nearby towns, and throughout Lancashire the following month. In November, agents were appointed in Glasgow and London, and they were followed in succeeding months by the first overseas agents: in India, South America and the Far East. Within a year, the Royal had 45 agents. The first step in establishing what was to become Royal’s most important market came in 1851 with the formation of a New York board. By 1853, Royal had been established in ten U.S. cities.

=== The acquisitions begin ===
On the death of Percy Dove in 1868, he was succeeded by John McLaren. He had joined Royal in 1856 as Assistant Secretary and was appointed general manager at the age of 41. He remained in office until his death in 1893. During his time fire premiums rose from £460,000 to over £2 million and life insurance premiums from £194,000 to £380,000. McLaren had vowed not to make any acquisitions until premiums exceeded £1 million and they reached that level in 1888. He then embarked on acquisitions that substantially increased the size and importance of Royal Insurance. First came the National Fire Insurance, and the Brighton and Sussex Fire Insurance in 1889 but the transforming acquisition was that of the Queen Insurance in 1891. Queen Insurance was already operating on a worldwide basis and the acquisition made the Royal the largest fire insurance company in the world.

The early years of the twentieth century saw two acquisitions which took Royal into new product areas. The British Engine and Boiler Co., founded in 1878, was acquired in 1912 and within the Royal it developed into one of the leading engineering insurers in the world. More substantial was the entry into marine insurance. Increased risks in the marine market led to many of the insurers being acquired by the larger composites and the Royal bought British & Foreign Marine in 1909. Founded in Liverpool in 1863, it had a network of overseas agents and by the opening of the twentieth century was one of Britain's two largest marine insurers.

In October 1919, the Royal announced its agreed purchase of the Liverpool & London & Globe Insurance in what was the industry's largest insurance merger to date, leaving it substantially ahead of its nearest competitor. The "Globe's" subsequent EGM to approve the merger made it clear that it would work "under its own directors and management as a separate concern". There was an overlap in the two insurers' interests, for instance in the colonial markets. However, the benefits of amalgamation were slow to materialise. The enlarged Royal comprised several large companies in Britain and the USA, all with separate names and identities. Pugh listed eight from the Royal and six from the Globe. "Nor was it intended that the identity of any of these companies…would be lost". It was not until 1938 that all the US companies were in the same head office and Royal and Globe continued with their head offices until after the Second World War. Although the 1930s was a period of difficult trading, the Royal continued its expansion through new offices and after the War, the Royal was still by far the largest British insurer in the US.

=== Post-war growth ===
The post-war period saw further acquisitions and a rationalisation of the company's semi-independent subsidiaries. In 1961, Royal bought Canada Western Assurance and British American Insurance and, at home, London and Lancashire Insurance. The acquisition of London and Lancashire was part of a wave of British insurance mergers and contributed £70 million to combined assets of £400 million. However, its underwriting profits were only £20,000 compared to Royal’s £2 million. The rationalisation continued and was marked, in particular, with the move of the head office from Liverpool to London in 1960. Even that had not gone far enough because there was further restructuring in 1981, with new companies made responsible for specific product areas, e.g., Royal Life Insurance Ltd.

=== Overexpansion and the final merger ===
Expansion in the United States continued in 1982, when the group acquired the Milbank Insurance Company followed in 1983 by the Missouri-based Silvey Corporation and American Overseas Holdings. At this point the United States was the Royal’s largest single market, representing 41% of its worldwide general insurance premiums. The acquisitions continued unabated. To strengthen its life business, Royal bought Lloyd’s Life in 1985 for £93 million, followed by the US life company Macabees in 1989. Like other financial institutions, in 1985 Royal started buying chains of estate agents, continuing right until the end of the housing boom; by October 1988 it had a controlling interest in 772 branches. Previously averse to high levels of debt, Royal borrowed over £800 million to finance the purchase of the life companies and estate agents. Added to the problems that this overexpansion caused, was the Royal’s involvement with mortgage indemnity policies. (If a house buyer requires a mortgage of more than, for example, 75% of the house price, the building society may require the buyer to purchase an insurance policy that protects the lender against loss on that excess.) By August 1992, the Royal estimated that mortgage indemnity losses would cost over £500 million. In the three years to 1992, Royal’s underwriting losses were £2.2 billion and, after crediting investment income, a pre-tax loss of £679 million. When the turnround came, it was rapid: by 1993, Royal had returned to profit and a £400 million rights issue helped to improve the capital base. A year later, pre-tax profits reached a record £400 million.

In May 1996 the £5.4 billion merger of Royal Insurance and Sun Alliance was announced, with an expected loss of 5,000 jobs and cost savings of £175 million. It was finalised on 19 July creating Royal & Sun Alliance Group.

== Buildings ==
The Company was initially based at a head office on Queen Avenue in Liverpool but then moved to a new head office on New John Street in 1903.

Following the acquisition of London and Lancashire Insurance, the enlarged company established its new head office at Liverpool & London's former head office at 1 Cornhill in London at that time. It opened a new operational headquarters, known as The Capital, in Old Hall Street in Liverpool in July 1976 although the head office remained at 1 Cornhill in London. The head office in London was completely refurbished in 1979.

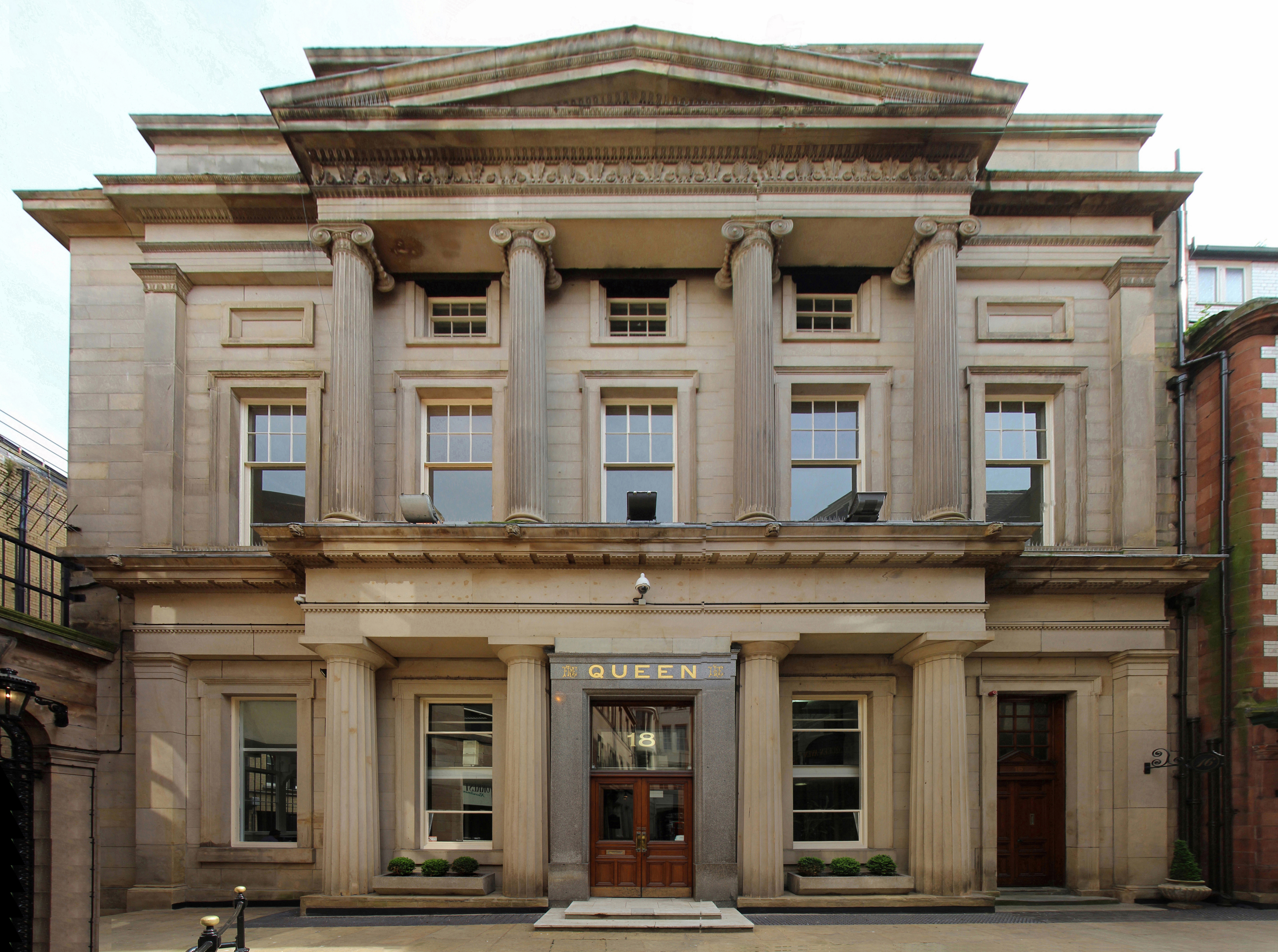
Royal Insurance Building, Queen Avenue, Liverpool

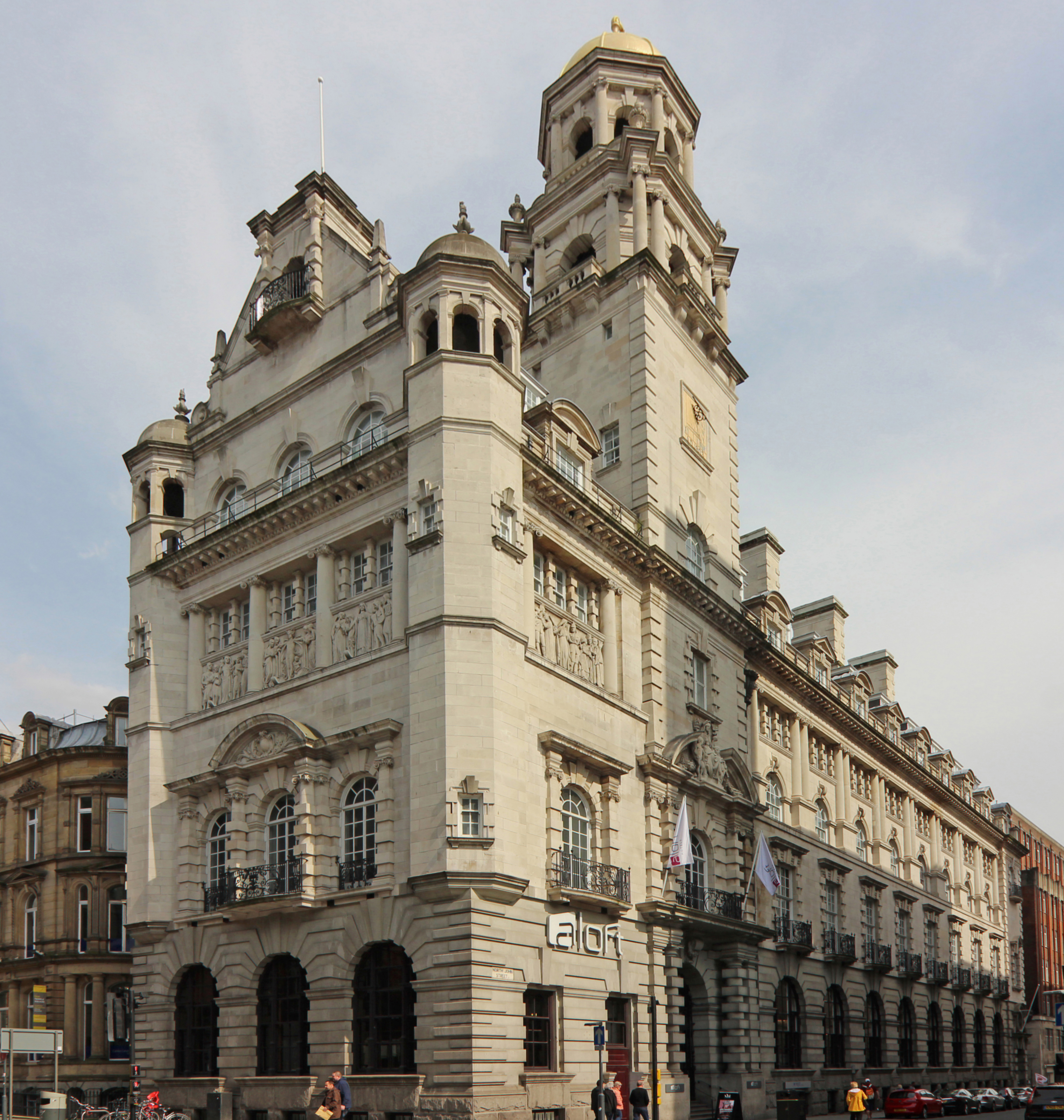
Royal Insurance Building, North John Street, Liverpool

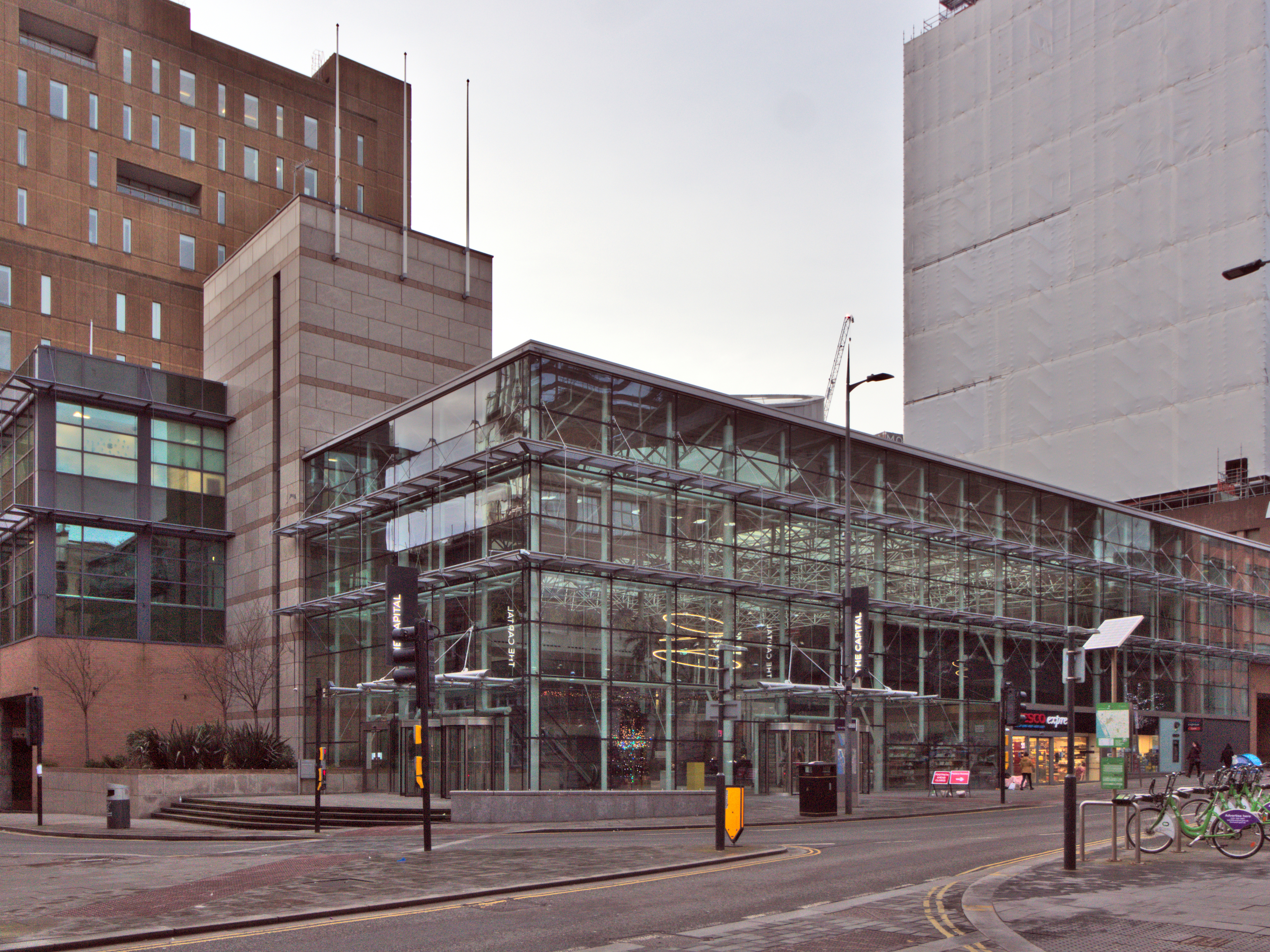
The Capital, Old Hall Street, Liverpool

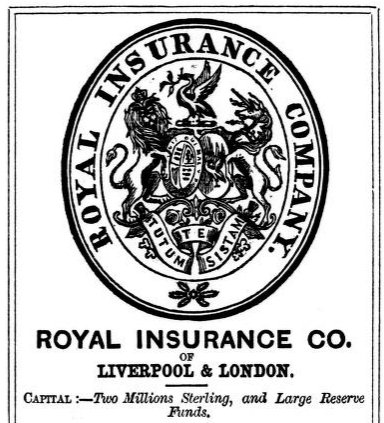
Royal Insurance crest 1857

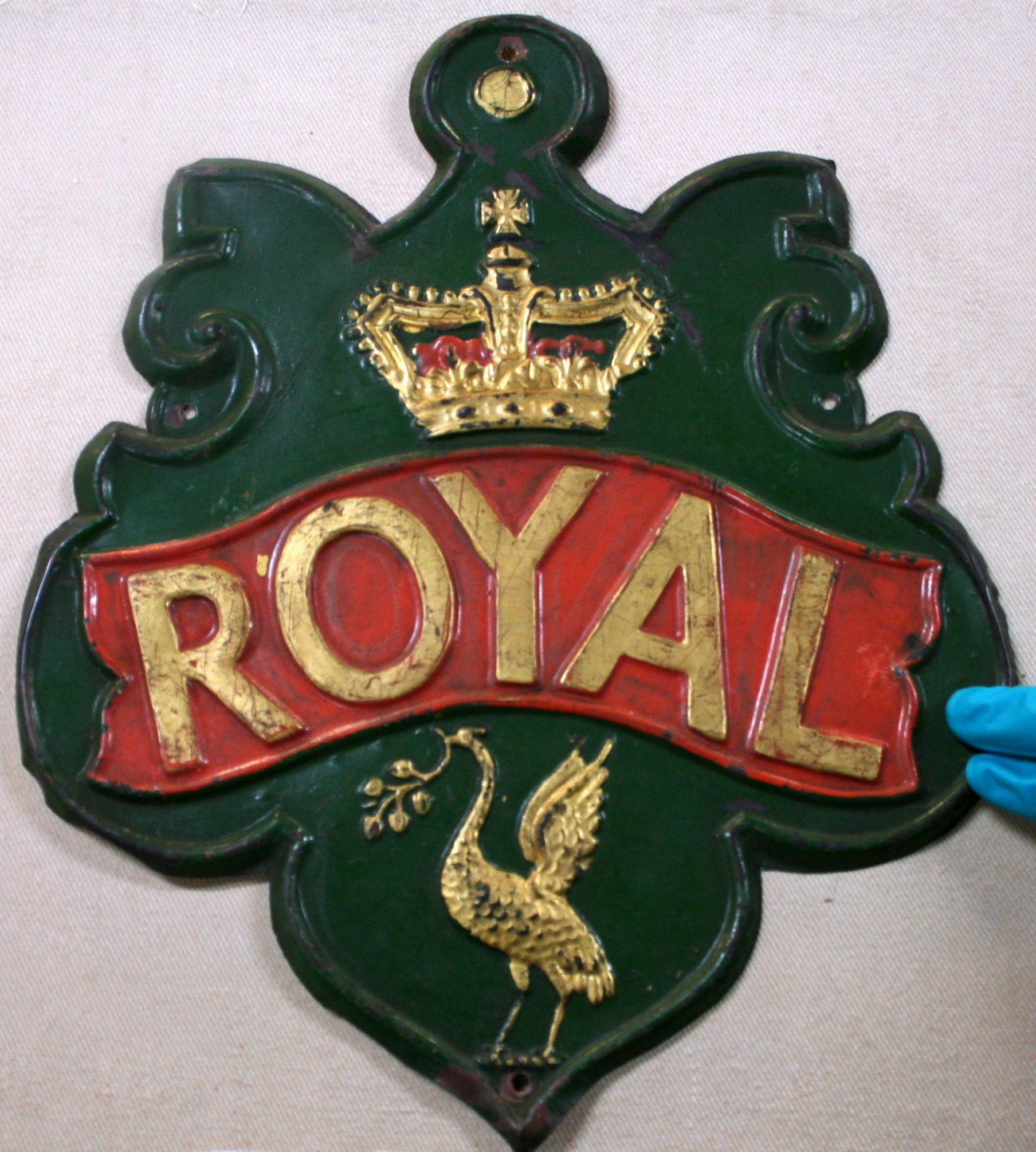
Royal Insurance Fire Mark post-1845

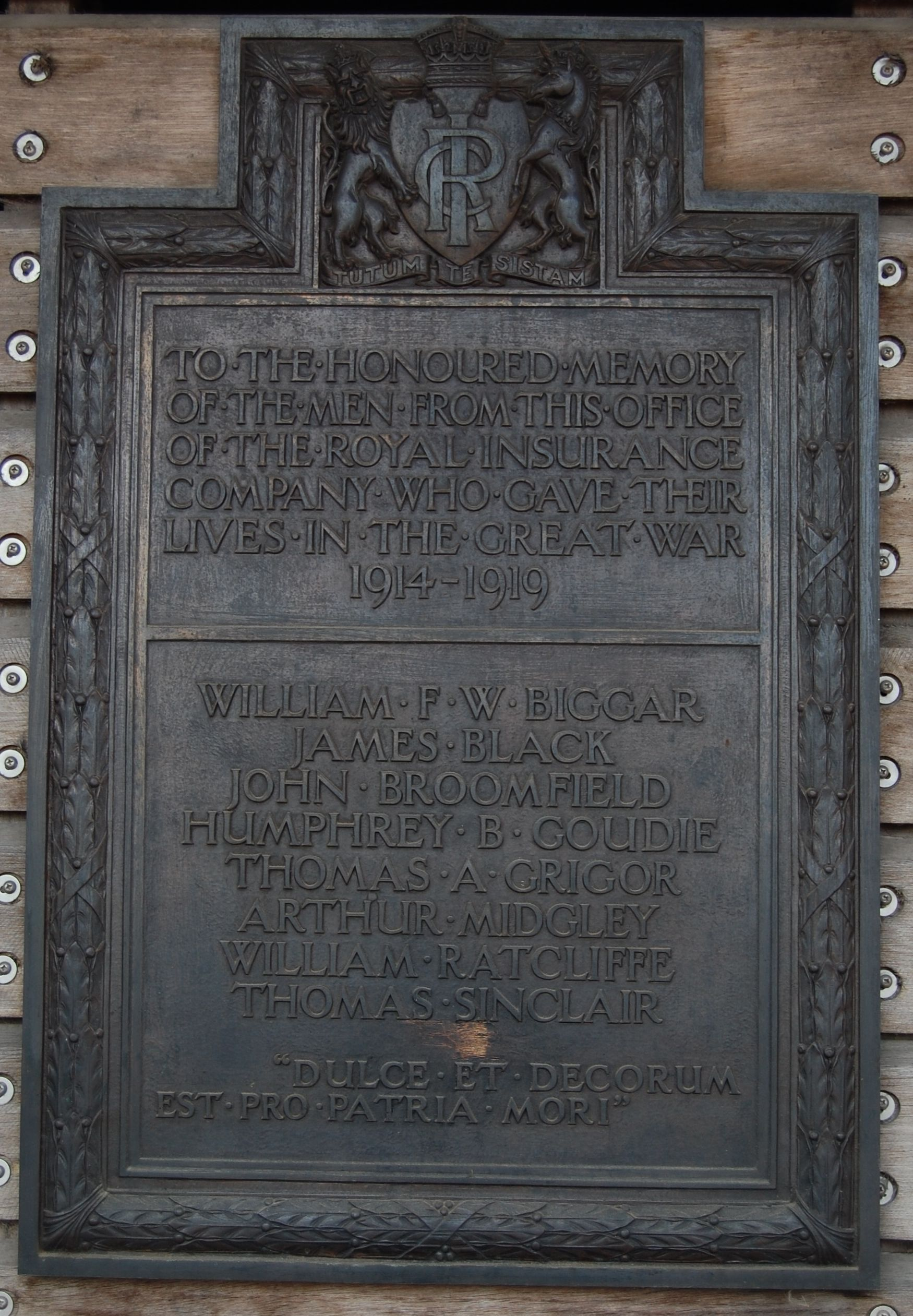
Royal Insurance war memorial, now relocated to the National Memorial Arboretum
