= Royal Insurance Building, Queen Avenue, Liverpool =

Royal Insurance Building, Queen Avenue
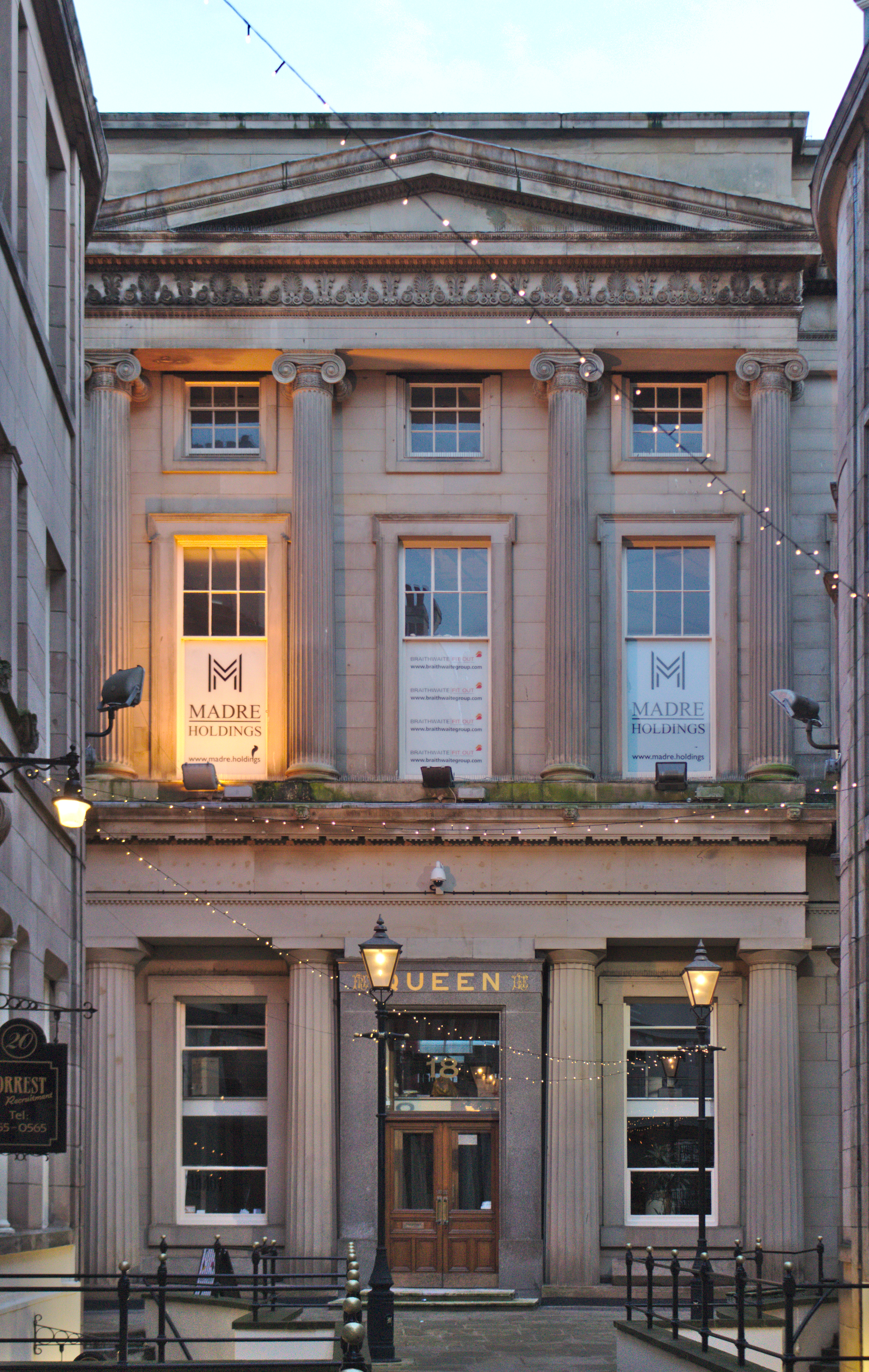
- Royal Insurance Building, Queen Avenue

- Location in Liverpool
- 53°24′24″N 2°59′25″W
- Location: 16–18 Queen Avenue, Liverpool, Merseyside, England

History
- Built: 1837-9
- Built for: Royal Insurance Company

Site notes
- Architect: Samuel Rowland

Listed Building – Grade II*
- Designated: 14 March 1975
- Reference no.: 1365827

The Royal Insurance Building is a historic building located at Queen Avenue, Liverpool, Merseyside, England. It was built as the head office of the Royal Insurance Company and was used until they moved to a building on New John Street in 1903.

== Architecture ==
The building was designed by Samuel Rowland in the Neoclassical style and completed in 1839. The design involved a symmetrical main frontage with five bays facing onto Queen Avenue; the central section of three bays formed a tetrastyle portico with fluted Doric order columns supporting an entablature. There were Ionic order columns spanning the first and second floors which supported a frieze and a pediment.

== See also ==
- Grade II* listed buildings in Merseyside
- Architecture of Liverpool
