= John Macvicar Anderson =

Scottish architect

- Born: 11 July 1835; Glasgow, Scotland
- Died: 9 June 1915 (aged 79); London, England

John Macvicar Anderson FRSE (11 July 1835, Glasgow – 9 June 1915, London) was a Scottish architect.

He was born in Glasgow in 1835, the son of John Anderson, merchant and the nephew of architect William Burn and his wife, Eliza Macvicar. He was educated at the Collegiate School and the University of Glasgow and then moved to London to complete his articles with his uncle. He was admitted ARIBA (Associate of the Royal Institute of British Architects) on 19 December 1864.

In or around 1868, Burn took him into partnership and when Burn died on 15 February 1870 Anderson took over the practice and Burn's house at 6 Stratton Street Piccadilly. Although he designed the Sailors' Home in Bombay in 1869, Anderson continued the exclusively country house nature of Burn's practice but from the early 1880s accepted a wider range of commercial and ecclesiastical business, particularly from Scottish clients, notably St Columba's church in Pont Street, London of which he was a member, the Headquarters of the London Scottish, Christie's Galleries, King Street, Lloyds Bank, Coutts Bank and the British Linen Bank whose Threadneedle Street office he designed as late as 1913. All of these were directly commissioned. Other financial institutions for which Anderson designed buildings in London include the Commercial Bank of Scotland, Liverpool and London Globe Insurance, and Phoenix Fire Office.

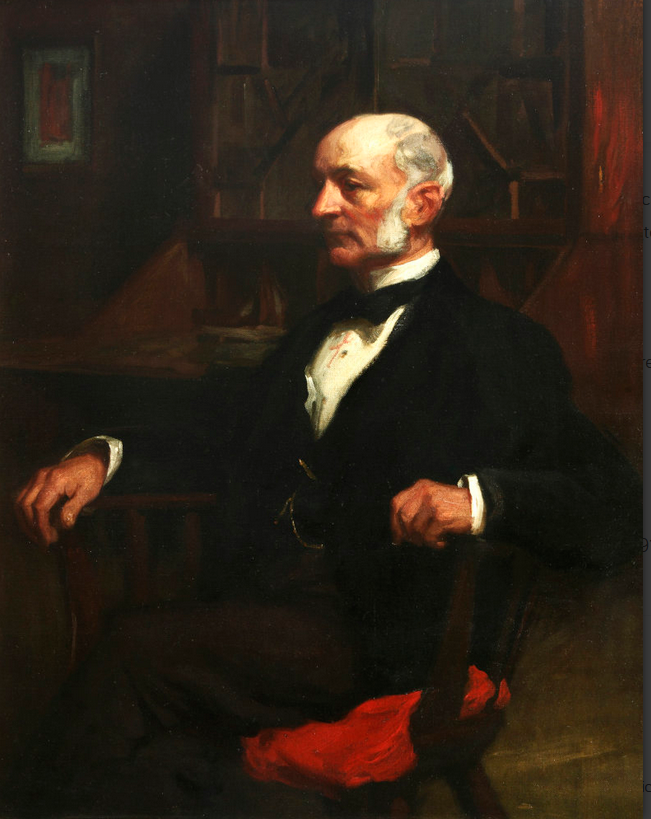
Portrait of Anderson by Charles Wellington Furse

He was President of the Royal Institute of British Architects in 1891–94. He was also honorary architect to the Royal Scottish Hospital and Royal Caledonian Asylum.

He died at Stratton Street on 9 June 1915. He had married Janet Crum of Thornliebank, Scotland and had three sons. His practice was continued by his middle son, Henry Lennox Anderson, born 1894, who studied at the Architectural Association and was taken into partnership in 1905.
