= Black Callerton =

Hamlet in Tyne and Wear, England

Coordinates: 55.022711°N 1.7266420°W

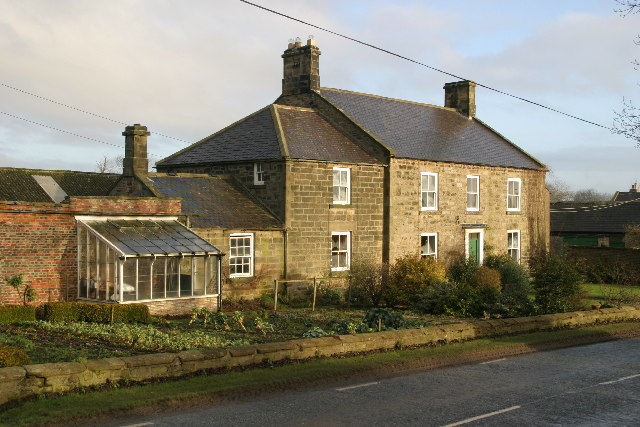

- Location within Tyne and Wear
- Civil parish: Woolsington
- Metropolitan borough: Newcastle upon Tyne
- Metropolitan county: Tyne and Wear
- Region: North East
- Country: England
- Sovereign state: United Kingdom
- Police: Northumbria
- Fire: Tyne and Wear
- Ambulance: North East

Black Callerton is a hamlet and former civil parish about 5 miles from Newcastle upon Tyne, now in the parish of Woolsington, in the Newcastle upon Tyne district, in the county of Tyne and Wear, England. In 1951 the parish had a population of 365.

== History ==
The name "Callerton" means 'Calves' hill, the "Black" part distinguishes it from High and Little Callerton. Black Callerton is possibly a shrunken medieval village, although there are no indications on the ground. The earliest reference to the settlement dates from 1246. Black Callerton was formerly a township in the parish of Newburn. From 1866, Black Callerton was a civil parish in its own right until it was abolished and merged with Woolsington on 1 April 1955. In 1974 it became part of Tyne and Wear, having previously been part of Northumberland.
