= Grade II listed buildings in Liverpool-L1 =

Liverpool is a city and port in Merseyside, England, which contains many listed buildings. A listed building is a structure designated by Historic England of being of architectural and/or of historical importance and, as such, is included in the National Heritage List for England. There are three grades of listing, according to the degree of importance of the structure. Grade I includes those buildings that are of "exceptional interest, sometimes considered to be internationally important"; the buildings in Grade II* are "particularly important buildings of more than special interest"; and those in Grade II are "nationally important and of special interest". Very few buildings are included in Grade I — only 2.5% of the total. Grade II* buildings represent 5.5% of the total, while the great majority, 92%, are included in Grade II.

Liverpool contains more than 1,550 listed buildings, of which 28 are in Grade I, 109 in Grade II*, and the rest in Grade II. (Note: These figures are taken from a search in the National Heritage List for England in May 2013, and are subject to variation as further buildings are listed, grades are revised, or buildings are delisted.) This list contains the Grade II listed buildings in the L1 postal district of Liverpool. This area of the city formed part of the commercial hub of the city during the 19th and early 20th centuries. From that time, and continuing into the present, it also contains the major shopping district of the city. During the late 18th century, residential streets were developed in the area, the most important of these being Rodney Street, Duke Street, Seel Street and Bold Street. Some of the buildings in these streets continue to be used for domestic use, others have been adapted for different purposes, including retail and professional.

Grade II listed buildings from other areas in the city can be found through the box on the right, along with the lists of the Grade I and Grade II* buildings in the city.

== Buildings ==
Name	Location	Photograph	Built	Notes
—	15 Argyle Street; 53.4020°N 2.9849°W		Mid-19th century	Originally a warehouse, the building is in brick with a slate roof. It has a rectangular plan, with six storeys and a basement. It has been converted into flats.
Old Bridewell	17 Argyle Street; 53.4025°N 2.9842°W		1861	This was originally a bridewell and police station. It is built in brick with stone dressings and has a slate roof. The building is in two storeys, has three bays, and is in Italianate style. It is asymmetrical and has two towers of different heights. It has since been used as a restaurant. The boundary walls are included in the listing.
—	23 Argyle Street; 53.4016°N 2.9842°W		Mid to late 19th century	A warehouse with five storeys and a cellar. It is in brick, with a plastered ground floor, and a slate roof. The building is in three bays, has windows with segmental arches and, in the top floor, oval windows. It has a wooden catshead.
—	28 & 30 Argyle Street; 53.4016°N 2.9847°W		Mid to late 19th century	A linear range of 2 warehouses with working access to the street frontage. Built in dark brown brick with stone dressings, coped gable and Welsh slate roof coverings. No 28 has 4 storeys and 5 bays and No 30 has 6 storeys and 3 bays.
Heap's Rice Mill	Beckwith Street; 53.3998°N 2.9857°W		Early to mid 19th century	Originating as a rice mill, with warehouses added and later combined into a single building. It is constructed in brick with some sandstone dressings, and has roofs of slate, tiles and corrugated sheeting and a frame of timber and cast iron. The whole building has a square plan, and is mainly in seven storeys.
—	8 and 10 Benson Street; 53.4037°N 2.9753°W		1844–48	Originally a house with an attached warehouse, built in ashlar sandstone and brick, with a slate roof. It was built for Samuel and James Holme, contractors, its design being attributed to Arthur Hill Holme. It is in Greek Revival style, and has a pediment with acanthus scrolls. The building was converted for residential use in 2003.
—	12 Benson Street; 53.4037°N 2.9760°W		1818	A brick house with stone dressings. It has three storeys, an attic and a basement, and is in two bays. All the windows have wedge lintels; most are sashes and one is a casement window.
—	8–14 Berry Street; 53.4015°N 2.9760°W		1800	A row of 4 shops, formerly one of a pair of crosswings of a residential building known as 'Warmsley's Yard' and built by John Warmsley(c.1765-1812), architect and builder. They are brick coated with painted stucco with ashlar sandstone dressings, brick ridge stacks and have a hipped roof of Welsh slate.
—	24–30 Berry Street; 87 Seel Street; 53.4011°N 2.9762°W		1798-1803	Three shops in stuccoed brick with sandstone dressings and a hipped slate roof. They were originally part of Walmsley's Yard. The building has an L-shaped plan in three storeys, with five bays facing Berry Street, and three bays facing Seel Street.
The Whitehouse	60 Berry Street; 53.4002°N 2.9766°W		c.1800	Former pub built of red brick with stucco finish with slate roof. Previous Banksy mural of cat on exterior wall removed and building converted to café.
Blackburne Terrace	1–6 Blackburne Place; 53.3993°N 2.9695°W		1826	A terrace of six houses in brick on a stone base, with stone dressings and a slate roof. They are in three storeys, and each house has three bays. The sash windows have wedge lintels, and four houses have porches with Doric fluted columns and entablatures. The entrances of the others have architraves and pilasters with capitals decorated with acanthus and lotus features.
—	3 Blackburne Place; 53.3997°N 2.9701°W		1820s	A house in brick with stone dressings and a slate roof. It has two storeys and a basement, and is in two bays. The windows are sashes with have wedge lintels.
—	5 and 7 Blackburne Place; 53.3997°N 2.9700°W		1820s	Two houses in brick with stone dressings and a slate roof. They are in three storeys and a basement, and have two bays to each house. The windows are sashes with have wedge lintels. The entrances have flat architraves and cornices.
—	6–15 Bold Place; 26 Roscoe Street; 53.4013°N 2.9748°W		Early 19th century	A row of ten houses in brick with stone dressings. They are in three storeys with a basement, and there are two bays to each house. The windows are a mix of sashes and casements. The doorways have Tuscan pilasters.
—	10 Bold Street; 53.4043°N 2.9812°W		Early 19th century	Originally a private house, later converted into a shop. It is in brick, the upper two floors being stuccoed. It has four storeys, and is in two bays.
—	12–16 Bold Street; 53.4043°N 2.9811°W		1848	The building was extended later. It is an iron-framed shop, with plate glass windows rising through two floors, between which are slim iron struts. No. 12 has three storeys, and Nos. 14 and 16 have four. No. 12 has a plain parapet at the top, and Nos. 14 and 16 have a cornice.
—	43–47 Bold Street; 53.4033°N 2.9785°W		1861	This was originally a branch of the Liverpool Union Bank, built in 1885, and is now three shops. It was designed by George Enoch Grayson and is constructed in stone with four storeys, and has five bays.
Marlborough House	52 Bold Street; 53.4035°N 2.9796°W		1852–53	Built as a music hall designed by Arthur Hill Holme, it has later been used as a shop. It is in two storeys with an attic, and has three bays facing Bold Street, and six bays on Concert Street. It is in brick and stone, now painted, and is in Italianate style. At the top of the building is a richly carved frieze.
—	58 Bold Street; 53.4034°N 2.9792°W		c. 1900	A shop in Arts and Crafts style. It is constructed in stone, with three storeys. The first floor has continuous glazing with iron mullions and transoms, breaking forward into three shallow oriels. In the top floor is a seven-light window.
—	75–79 Bold Street; 53.4028°N 2.9774°W		1830s	These shops are stuccoed, in three storeys, and five bays. They are in Greek Revival style. In the ground floor are three shop fronts with Doric columns, panelled pilasters, a pulvinated frieze, and a modillioned cornice. The central bay of the second floor contains an Ionic portico.
—	92 Bold Street; 53.4027°N 2.9778°W		c. 1879	This is a shop in three storeys and three bays with a modern shop front in the ground floor. The two storeys above are in a mixture of Greek and Egyptian styles. The middle storey contains Corinthian pilasters, a frieze, and a cornice, behind which runs unbroken glazing. The top storey comprises an open loggia, also with columns, and at the top of the building is an entablature.
—	66 Bridgewater Street; 53.3965°N 2.9830°W		c. 1857	A warehouse and office designed by William Culshaw, it is in brown brick with dressings in red brick and red sandstone and the roof is slated with coped gables. There are four storeys, the front facing the street has three bays, and there are nine bays on the sides. The central bay of the front is recessed and arched, and contains loading doors on each floor, and at the top is a jogger lift. In the right bay is a doorway with a sandstone surround and a triple keystone. The windows have segmental heads, and some are blind, and above the ground floor is a painted signage band.
—	25 and 25A Church Street; 53.4054°N 2.9844°W		Mid-19th century	A stuccoed shop building with four storeys and in three bays. In the ground floor are 20th-century shop fronts. On the first and second floors are pilasters behind giant columns. The windows in the first floor are round-headed windows, the second floor has three windows in moulded architraves, and in the top floor are three three-light windows.
Compton House	33–45 Church Street; 53.4054°N 2.9836°W		1865–67	An early purpose-built department store in stone with a slate roof. It has four storeys and an attic, and is in 13 bays. At each corner on the front is a square tower. The front is elaborately decorated, including the statue of a figure representing Commerce.
—	14 Colquitt Street; 53.4054°N 2.9844°W		Late 18th century	A brick house with stone dressings and a slate roof. It has three storeys and is in three bays. The windows are sashes under flat brick arches. One window is blind. The entrance is round-headed.
Royal Institution	26 Colquitt Street; 53.4013°N 2.9779°W		c. 1799	Originally built as the combined house and business premises for the merchant Thomas Parr. In 1815 the building was adapted to form the Royal Institution. It is in brick with stone dressings. The main block is in three storeys with five bays. This is connected on each side by a single storey wall to a pavilion in two storeys with three bays. At the front is a projecting Doric porch.
Newington Buildings	23 Cropper Street; 16 and 18 Newington; 53.4039°N 2.9776°W		1847	Shops in three storeys and five bays, with rusticated quoins at the corners and flanking the central bay, which is recessed. On the ground floor are shop windows and a round-headed entrance. In the first floor is a Venetian window. The other windows are sashes.
Juvenile Court	5 Crosshall Street; 53.4085°N 2.9851°W		1879–80	This was built as a chapel for the Welsh Calvinists, designed by W. H. Picton, and has later been used as a courthouse. It is built in stone with red granite shafts, and is in Romanesque style with round-headed windows. The building is in five storeys and five bays. It has a gable containing a five-light window with a roundel above, a Lombard frieze and a poppyhead finial.
Buckleys Buildings	38–46 Dale Street; 53.4079°N 2.9882°W		1880s	An office building in brick with stone dressings. It has six storeys, and eight bays. The ground floor contains shops, and the windows are rectangular in moulded architraves. There is a cornice over the first floor windows, and those in the second floor have pediments.
Westminster Buildings	90–98 Dale Street; 1 and 3 Crosshall Street; 53.4089°N 2.9856°W		1879–80	An office block in Gothic style designed by Richard Owens. It is built in stone with red granite window shafts, and has a slate roof. The building has three storeys, an attic and a basement, and is in six bays. It has a Mansard roof with dormers.
Humyak House	13 Duke Street; 53.4027°N 2.9846°W		1864	A brick warehouse with a slate roof in four storeys. The front has a pair of loading bays under round-headed arches in each storey, with a window between them. All the windows and doors have cast iron shutters, and the windows are barred. Inside are spiral staircases, and cast iron columns supporting the timber floors.
—	17–25 Duke Street; 53.4025°N 2.9844°W		Late 18th century	A terrace of five houses in brick with stone dressings and a slate roof. They are in three storeys, each house having three bays, other than No 25, which has two bays. The windows in Nos. 17 and 19 are casements, the others are sashes. The entrances are round-headed with Tuscan doorcases.
—	48 and 50 Duke Street; 53.4020°N 2.9834°W		c. 1760s	Two brick houses with stone dressings and a slate roof. They are in two storeys, each house having two bays; No 50 also has a gable. The windows are sashes with wedge lintels. The entrance to No. 48 is round-headed with a Doric doorcase and an open pediment.
Monro Public House	92 and 94 Duke Street; 53.4013°N 2.9807°W		Late 18th century	The public house is constructed in brick with stone dressings and a slate roof. It is in three storeys, with five bays on Duke Street and six on Suffolk Street.
—	96 Duke Street; 53.4012°N 2.9806°W		Late 18th century	Originally a house, later a shop and office, in rendered brick, with a tiled roof. Its main front is in three storeys and three bays, with a 19th-century single-storey shop extension. On the ground floor are four arched openings, with three windows to each floor above.
—	98 Duke Street; 53.4012°N 2.9805°W		c. 1770s	Built as a house, later used as an office, this is in brick with stone dressings and has a slate roof. It has three storeys and a basement, and is in three bays. The windows are sashes with wedge lintels. The central entrance is round-headed with a Doric doorcase with an open pediment.
—	105 Duke Street; 53.4017°N 2.9807°W		1800	Built as the Union News Room, designed by John Foster, senior. From 1852 it became Liverpool's first public library, then it was converted into offices in 1862. It is constructed in ashlar stone, and has two storeys. There are five bays on the Duke Street face, and three bays facing Slater Street. On the Slater Street side is a Venetian window with Ionic columns.
—	116 Duke Street; 53.4009°N 2.9797°W		Late 18th century	A house in brick with stucco and a slate roof. It has three storeys and a basement, and is in five bays. The windows are sashes with brick heads. The central entrance is round-headed with Ionic columns, a frieze and a cornice.
—	118 Duke Street; 53.4009°N 2.9796°W		Late 18th century	A house in brick with stone dressings and a slate roof. It is in three storeys with a basement, and has three bays. The windows are sashes with wedge lintels. The entrances are round-headed with Doric doorcases. It was the birthplace of the poet Felicia Hemans.
—	120, 122 and 124 Duke Street; 53.4008°N 2.9794°W		Late 18th century	A terrace of three houses in brick with stone dressings and a slate roof. They are in three storeys, each house having three bays. The windows are sashes with wedge lintels. The entrances are round-headed with Doric doorcases.
—	135–147 Duke Street; 53.4011°N 2.9793°W		Late 18th century	A terrace of seven houses, including a shop and offices, in painted brick with stone dressings and a slate roof. They are in three storeys with a basement. The windows are sashes with wedge lintels.
Warehouse	Duke Street Lane; 53.4023°N 2.9853°W		1863	A narrow warehouse in brick with a slate roof, five bays deep. Its gabled front is three storeys high with an attic. The front contains pairs of loading doors and a pulley hoist system. Inside is a spiral staircase. The beams are supported by cast iron columns.
—	20-28 Duke’s Terrace; 53.4007°N 2.9770°W		1843	A terrace of small back-to-back houses in three storeys with cellars. The front and back are identical, with four steps leading up to the doorways. They are in brick with one window in each storey, and are the only remaining back-to-back houses in Liverpool.
Statue of William Huskisson	Duke’s Terrace; 53.40074°N 2.97739°W		1846	This statue to William Huskisson was cast in bronze by Ferdinand von Miller in Munich from the marble statue by John Gibson. Huskisson is portrayed standing, wearing a Roman toga, and holding a scroll. This is placed on a granite plinth.
Warehouse	6 Fleet Street; 53.4038°N 2.9819°W		Early 19th century	Former warehouse built in red brick, laid to Flemish bond, with a shallow-pitch roof with concrete tile covering. The street frontage has 5 storeys above a basement, with double loading doorways. The gable apex has a projecting hoist beam in a gabled canopy.
Gatepiers and gates	Gambier Terrace; 53.39849°N 2.97123°W		c. 1836	These stand on the corner of Canning Street at the entrance to Gambier Terrace. They consist of seven stone gate piers, and wrought iron gates.
Wedding House	3 and 4 Great George Place; 53.3956°N 2.9768°W		1860s	This was built as the North and South Wales Bank. It is constructed in stone in Gothic Revival style, and has a slate roof. It is in three storeys with a basement and attic, and has a front of four bays under a pointed gable. The windows have pointed arches, and some are mullioned and transomed. Decoration on the front includes a frieze, and tympana containing the shields of England, Wales, Liverpool, and Ireland, and a central shield with the initials NSWB.
—	15–21 Great George Square; 53.3977°N 2.9791°W		Early 19th century	A terrace of four houses in brick with stone dressings and a slate roof. They are in three storeys with a basement, each house having three bays. The central six bays protrude forward and are surmounted by a pediment. The windows have flat brick arches; those of No. 21 are casements, and the others are sashes. All the entrances are round-headed. No. 21 has a first floor iron balcony.
—	30–33 Great George Square; 53.3986°N 2.9787°W		Early 19th century	A terrace of houses in brick with stone dressings and a slate roof, since renumbered as 48A - 48D Nelson Street. They are in three storeys with a basement, each house having three bays. The windows are sashes with flat brick arches. The entrances are round-headed with Doric doorcases with fluted columns.
Former Congregational Church	Great George Street; 53.3993°N 2.9768°W		1840–41	Originally a Congregational church, it is constructed in stone, and was designed by Joseph Franklin. At the northeast is a semicircular portico with fluted Corinthian monolith columns. Above this is a tower surmounted by a shallow dome, with a band of small wheel windows. Along the sides of the church are two tiers of windows between which are Corinthian pilasters. The church was converted into an arts centre (the Black-E) in the 1970s.
Liverpool Life Sciences UTC	45–51 Greenland Street; 53.3945°N 2.9793°W		Late 19th century	Former warehouse built in red brick with blue brick dressings. It is in 7 storeys with 14 bays, of which the loading bays are recessed.
Warehouse Block	12 Hanover Street; 53.4025°N 2.9857°W		1889–90	A curved office block and warehouse in brick and terracotta designed by Edmund Kirby. It has four storeys and is in twelve bays. In the ground floor are large round-arched windows, and above are three- and four-light windows. Between the windows the piers rise to form chimneys, between which is a balustrade. There is a balcony around the first floor.
Epstein Theatre (Former Neptune Theatre)	85 Hanover Street; 53.4045°N 2.9821°W		1913–15	Originally built as the Crane Building, it was a shop selling musical instruments, with a theatre above. It was designed by Walter Aubrey Thomas, and is in stone and brick. It has five storeys and an attic, and is in six bays. It is richly decorated externally and internally, the auditorium being in Neoclassical style.
Warehouse	Hanover Street; 53.4023°N 2.9857°W		1863	A brick warehouse with five storeys and in four bays. It contains round-headed loading bays, and segmental-headed windows with stanchions.
Church House	Hanover Street; 53.4028°N 2.9856°W		1885	Originally partly an institute for the Mersey Mission to Seamen and partly a temperance public house, designed by G. E. Grayson, later an office building. It is constructed in brick and terracotta with a tiled roof. It has three storeys and an attic, and is in six bays.
—	2 Hardman Street; 25 Rodney Street; 53.4017°N 2.9731°W		Mid-19th century	A brick house with stone dressings and a slate roof. It is in three storeys, and has three bays on both fronts. All the windows are sashes. On the Hardman Street face is an elaborate round-headed entrance with columns and a keystone. On the Rodney Street face is a plain round-headed entrance and a canted bay window.
Former Royal School for the Blind	24 Hardman Street; 53.4015°N 2.9713°W		1849–51	This was built as the School for the Blind, designed by Arthur Hill Holme. It is faced with Bath stone, is in two storeys, and has 15 bays. The central five bays project forward and have a pediment. Behind the front the building is more utilitarian. It has a central rotunda from which four wings radiate. The building later became a resource centre.
Warehouse	18 Henry Street and 12 York Street; 53.4015°N 2.9835°W		Late 19th century	Former warehouse built of dark brown brick with red and blue brick detailing and stone dressings, with a Welsh slate and corrugated roof. 4 storeys and basement with 3 street frontages. Now converted to apartments.
—	2, 4 and 6 Hope Place; 53.4008°N 2.9724°W		Early 19th century	Three brick houses with stone dressings and slate roofs. They are in three storeys and have a basement. Each house is in three bays. The windows are sashes with wedge lintels, other than those in No. 2, which are casements. Nos. 4 and 6 have Doric doorcases with columns.
—	5 and 7 Hope Place; 53.4010°N 2.9717°W		Early 19th century	Two brick houses with stone dressings and slate roofs. They are in three storeys and have a stuccoed basement. Each house is in two bays. The windows are sashes with wedge lintels. In No. 5 is a canted bow window. The round-headed entrances have doorcases with panelled pilasters.
—	8–22 Hope Place; 53.4007°N 2.9718°W		Early 19th century	A terrace of eight brick houses with stone dressings and slate roofs. They are in three storeys and a basement, with each house having two bays. The windows are sashes with wedge lintels. The round-headed entrances have Ionic doorcases.
—	9–17 Hope Place; 53.4010°N 2.9716°W		Early 19th century	A terrace of five brick houses with stone dressings and slate roofs. They are in three storeys and a basement, with each house having two bays. The windows are sashes with wedge lintels, other than those of No. 9, which are casements. The round-headed entrances have Ionic doorcases, other than that of No. 9. At the top of the terrace is a frieze and a cornice.
—	15 Hope Street; 53.4028°N 2.9695°W		Early 19th century	A brick house with stone dressings and slate roofs. It is in two storeys and a basement, and has two bays. The windows are sashes with wedge lintels.
—	17 and 19 Hope Street; 53.4026°N 2.9696°W		Early 19th century	Two houses in brick with stone dressings and slate roofs on a stone plinth. Each house has three storeys and a basement, and both houses are in two bays. The windows are sashes with wedge lintels. No. 17 has a Doric doorcase with fluted columns. The columns are missing from the doorcase of No. 19.
—	21 Hope Street; 53.4026°N 2.9697°W		Early 19th century	A house in brick with stone dressings and a slate roof. It has three storeys and a basement, and is in two bays. All the windows have wedge lintels. The entrance is round-headed and has a doorcase with missing columns.
Masonic Hall	22 Hope Street; 53.4027°N 2.9701°W		1872	A hall in stone with a basement and attic. It has two storeys and is in four bays, with a Mansard roof containing dormers. The round-headed entrance has an Ionic doorcase with a tympanum arms. Flanking it are Venetian windows interspersed with round-headed blind windows. Other features include friezes, architraves, pediments, and a balustrade.
—	23 Hope Street; 53.4025°N 2.9697°W		Early 19th century	A house in brick with stone dressings and a slate roof. It has three storeys and a basement, and is in four bays. All the windows have wedge lintels; those in the first floor are sashes and the others are casements. The entrance is round-headed with a Doric doorcase over which is an open pediment.
—	25, 27, 29 and 29A Hope Street; 53.4023°N 2.9698°W		1819	A terrace of four houses in brick with stone dressings and slate roofs. Each house is in three storeys with a basement. No 29A has two bays facing Hope Street and three facing Arrad Street; the others have three bays facing Hope Street. All the windows have wedge lintels, and most are sashes; No. 29A has a casement window. All the houses have central round-headed entrances with Doric doorcases.
—	28 Hope Street; 53.4021°N 2.9703°W		Early 19th century	A brick house with stone dressings and slate roofs. It has two storeys with a basement, and is in six bays. The windows are sashes with wedge lintels, other than one casement. The entrance in an arched recess is flat-headed.
—	30 Hope Street; 53.4021°N 2.9704°W		Early 19th century	A brick house with stone dressings and slate roofs. It has two storeys and is in five bays. The windows are sashes with wedge lintels. Around the entrance are 3/4 columns, a frieze, a cornice, and a semicircular fanlight.
—	33 and 35 Hope Street; 2 Blackburne Place; 53.3996°N 2.9710°W		Early 19th century	A terrace of three houses in brick with stone dressings and slate roofs. Each house has three storeys with a stone basement, and is in three bays. The windows are sashes with wedge lintels. The round-headed entrances have Doric doorcases with stucco archivolts. Two of the houses have first-floor balconies.
—	37 and 39 Hope Street; 53.3995°N 2.9710°W		Early 19th century	A terrace of three houses in brick with stone dressings and slate roofs. Each house has three storeys with a stone basement, and is in three bays. The windows are sashes with wedge lintels. The round-headed entrances have Doric doorcases with stucco archivolts.
—	41, 43 and 45 Hope Street; 53.3992°N 2.9711°W		Early 19th century	A terrace of three houses in brick with stone dressings and slate roofs. Each house has three storeys with a stone basement, and is in two bays. The windows are sashes with wedge lintels. Nos, 41 and 43 have round-headed entrances with Doric doorcases and stucco archivolts. No. 45 has an architrave with fluting.
Former Hahnemann Homeopathic Hospital	42–56 Hope Street; 53.4006°N 2.9712°W		1887	A former hospital in red brick with stone dressings and a slate roof. It is in Queen Anne style, and was designed by F. and G. Holme and paid for by Henry Tate. It is in three storeys, with a basement, lower basement and an attic, and forms three sides of a courtyard.
—	47 Hope Street; 53.3991°N 2.9711°W		Early 19th century	A symmetrical brick house with a slate roof. It has three storeys with a stuccoed basement, and is in three bays. The windows are sashes with stuccoed wedge lintels. Eight steps lead up to its round-headed entrance.
—	49 and 49A Hope Street; 53.3988°N 2.9711°W		Early 19th century	A house in brick with stone dressings and a slate roof. It has three storeys and a basement. Four bays face Hope Street, with three bays facing Canning Street. All the windows have wedge lintels; those facing Hope Street are sashes and those facing Canning Street are casements. No 49A has Ionic columns and an entablature.
—	53–59 Hope Street; 53.3962°N 2.9709°W		Early 19th century	A terrace of four houses in brick with stone dressings and a slate roof. They have three storeys and a basement, and each house is in two bays. The windows are sashes with wedge lintels, other than No 59, which has casements. The entrances are round-headed with Doric doorcases.
—	58 Hope Street; 53.4004°N 2.9713°W		Early 19th century	A house in brick with stone dressings and a slate roof. It has three storeys and a basement, and is in three bays. The windows are sashes with wedge lintels. The central entrance is round-headed with a Doric doorcase flanked by fluted columns.
—	60 Hope Street; 53.4002°N 2.9714°W		Early 19th century	A house in brick with stone dressings and a slate roof. It has two storeys and a basement, and is in three bays. The windows are sashes with wedge lintels. The central entrance is round-headed with a Doric doorcase.
—	61 and 63 Hope Street; 53.3973°N 2.9707°W		Early 19th century	Two stuccoed houses with a slate roof. They have three storeys and a basement, and each house is in three bays. The windows are sashes. The windows and the entrances have architraves. In the first floor is an entablature with paterae, and at the top of the house is a frieze, and a cornice.
—	62 Hope Street; 53.4001°N 2.9715°W		Mid-19th century	A house in brick with stone dressings and a slate roof. It has two storeys and a basement, and is in three bays. Two of the bays are bowed. The windows are sashes with wedge lintels. The entrance has a flat architrave with a cornice.
—	64 and 66 Hope Street; 53.4001°N 2.9715°W		Early 19th century	Two houses in brick with stone dressings and a slate roof. They have three storeys and a basement, and each house is in three bays. The windows are sashes with wedge lintels. Both houses have round-headed entrances, the windows above them with an architrave, a frieze, and a cornice.
—	65 Hope Street; 53.3960°N 2.9709°W		Early 19th century	A house in brick with stone dressings and a slate roof. It has three storeys and a basement, and is in three bays. The windows are sashes with wedge lintels. The central entrance is round-headed with a Doric doorcase flanked by fluted columns.
—	67–71 Hope Street; 53.3958°N 2.9709°W		1820s	Three stuccoed houses with a slate roof in two storeys. They have eight bays, the two bays at each end projecting forward with a pedimented attic. The windows are sashes, those in the projecting bays having architraves, and a round-headed window above them in the attic. The entrances also have architraves.
St John's Beacon (Radio City Tower)	1 Houghton Street; 53.4063°N 2.9820°W		1965–69	Initially an observation tower, it was converted into a radio broadcasting studio in 1999. It is built in concrete, and consists of a tapering circular tower 138 metres (453 ft) high. It stands on a concrete podium, and near the top is a crow's nest-like lantern projection. This is glazed and wrapped around it is a lettered band. On its flat top is telecommunications equipment.
College of Art	68 Hope Street; 53.3995°N 2.9715°W		1882	The main entrance is in a wing added in 1910. The building is in Neoclassical style, with a Mansard roof. It has two storeys, with 12 bays along Mount Street and 13 along Hope Street. At the centre of the Hope Street front is a rusticated porch with fluted Doric attached columns. This is flanked by two two-storey bay windows.
—	39, 41 and 43 Knight Street; 53.4003°N 2.9735°W		Early 19th century	A terrace of three houses in brick with stone dressings and a slate roof. They have three storeys and a basement, and each house is in two bays. All the windows but one are sashes with wedge lintels. The entrances are round-headed.
Crown Hotel	43 Lime Street; 53.4067°N 2.9790°W		1905	A public house in Art Nouveau style, built in brick and stucco, with marble facing to the ground floor. It is in three storeys with attics, and has 2x3 bays. The middle and top floor have bay windows, and in the attic are lunettes. On the Skelhorne Street side is an inscribed panel. The interior is elaborately decorated.
ABC Cinema	Lime Street; 53.4062°N 2.9793°W		1931	Originally the Forum Cinema, it was designed by William R. Glen. It is faced in Portland stone and carries little external decoration. The interior contains a gallery and a square proscenium arch, and is more elaborately decorated.
Lime Street Station	Lime Street; 53.4075°N 2.9777°W		1836	The station was extended to the south in 1877–79. The older part has a curved glass roof carried on double iron columns in Doric style. The later part is on square piers. Facing Lime Street is a stone screen with Tuscan pilasters between round-arched openings. On the Skelhorne Street face are Tuscan columns supporting a cornice.
Lime Street Chambers	Lime Street; 53.4082°N 2.9789°W		1868–71	Built as the Great North Western Hotel for the London and North Western Railway, this is a stone building with slate roofs designed by Alfred Waterhouse. It is in French Renaissance style, has five storeys with a basement and attic, and is in 21 bays. It has towers at the corners and flanking the entrance. The former hotel has been converted into accommodation for students of the John Moores University.
Empire Theatre	Lime Street; 53.4088°N 2.9783°W		1924–25	A steel-framed theatre in brick with a Portland stone front in Neoclassical style. Above the entrance is a steel canopy, and over this is a balcony with Ionic columns and windows behind. At the top is a dentilled cornice. The interior has elaborately decorated plasterwork.
—	2 Mount Street; 53.4001°N 2.9735°W		Early 19th century	This is a brick house with stone dressings and a hipped slate roof. It has three storeys and is in three bays, and has a cornice at the top. The windows are sashes, above which are wedge lintels.
—	3 Mount Street; 53.4002°N 2.9732°W		Early 19th century	A brick house with stone dressings and a slate roof. It has three storeys and a basement, is in four bays. The windows are sashes with wedge lintels. The round-headed entrance has an architrave and a keystone, and the doorcase has panelled pilasters and a frieze. Above the door is a blocked fanlight with a 20th-century relief of musical instruments.
—	4 Mount Street; 53.4000°N 2.9731°W		Early 19th century	A brick house with stone dressings and a slate roof, in three storeys and with three bays. At the top is a cornice, and a shop front has been inserted in the ground floor. The windows are sashes, above which are wedge lintels. The middle window in the first floor is blind.
—	5 Mount Street; 53.4002°N 2.9730°W		Early 19th century	A brick house with stone dressings and a slate roof. It has three storeys and a basement, is in three bays, and has a cornice at the top. The windows are sashes with wedge lintels. The central entrance has a round head and a frieze.
—	7 Mount Street; 53.4001°N 2.9727°W		c. 1820 (probable)	A brick house with stone dressings and a slate roof. It has three storeys and a basement, is in two bays, and has a cornice at the top. The doorcase is flanked by fluted pilasters. To its left is a canted bay window, above which are two blind windows. The other windows are sashes.
—	8 Mount Street; 53.4000°N 2.9730°W		Early 19th century	A brick house with stone dressings and a slate roof. It has three storeys and a basement, and is in three bays. The windows have wedge lintels; those in the first floor are sashes and those elsewhere are casements. The central entrance has flat pilasters, a panelled frieze and a cornice.
—	9–25 Mount Street; 53.4001°N 2.9723°W		Early 19th century	A terrace of brick houses with stone dressings and slate roofs. They have three storeys and a basement. Each house has one bay. The windows are sashes with wedge lintels. The entrances are round-arched.
—	27–33 Mount Street; 53.4001°N 2.9721°W		Early 19th century	A terrace of four brick houses with stone dressings and slate roofs. They have three storeys and a basement. Each pair of houses is in three one bays. All the windows have wedge lintels; they are a mix of sashes and casements. The entrances are paired and have elliptical arches, semicircular fanlights and Tuscan doorcases.
—	35 Mount Street; 53.4000°N 2.9715°W		Early 19th century	A brick house with stone dressings and a hipped slate roof. It has three storeys and a basement, and is in four bays. The windows are sashes with wedge lintels. The round-headed entrance has a flat architrave.
Liverpool Institute	Mount Street; 53.3998°N 2.9722°W		1835–37	Originally the Mechanics' Institution, then the Liverpool Institution, and in the 1990s as the Liverpool Institute for Performing Arts when the building was expanded. The original part was designed by Arthur Wall Holme in Greek Revival style. It is a stone building in two storeys with a front of nine bays. The three central bays protrude forward to form a tetrastyle portico.
—	10 and 12 Nelson Street; 53.3996°N 2.9771°W		Early 19th century	Two houses in brick with stone dressings and a slate roof. They have three storeys and a basement, and each house is in two bays. The windows are sashes, above which are wedge lintels. The entrances are round-headed, and each has a Doric doorcase with fluted columns.
—	14 and 16 Nelson Street; 53.3995°N 2.9772°W		Early 19th century	Two houses in brick with stone dressings and a slate roof. They have three storeys and a basement, and each house is in two bays. The windows are sashes, above which are wedge lintels. Shop windows have been inserted into the ground floor. No. 16 has a Doric doorcase with fluted columns.
—	18 Nelson Street; 53.3994°N 2.9773°W		Early 19th century	A brick house with stone dressings and a slate roof. It has three storeys and a basement, and is in three bays. The entrance is round-headed, and has a Doric doorcase with fluted columns. One window is blind, the others are sashes with wedge lintels.
—	20 Nelson Street; 53.3994°N 2.9774°W		Early 19th century	This originated as a mission building, later converted into a house. It is in brick with stone dressings and a slate roof. It has three storeys and a basement, and is in five bays. The windows are sashes, above which are wedge lintels. The entrance is round-headed, and has a Doric doorcase with fluted columns. On the first floor is a bowed balcony.
—	22, 24 and 26 Nelson Street; 53.3993°N 2.9774°W		Early 19th century	Three houses in brick with stone dressings and a slate roof. They have three storeys and a basement, and each house is in two bays. The windows are sashes, above which are wedge lintels. No 26 has a canted shop window. All the entrances are round-headed, those of Nos 22 and 24 have Doric doorcases with fluted columns.
—	44 Nelson Street; 53.3989°N 2.9781°W		Early 19th century	A brick house with stone dressings and a slate roof. It has three storeys, with a cornice at the top. The windows have wedge lintels; those on the ground floor are casements, and the others are sashes. The entrance has a panelled doorcase.
Queensway Tunnel, entrance	Old Haymarket; 53.4093°N 2.9844°W		1925–34	The entrance to the tunnel was designed by Herbert J. Rowse, and is constructed in Portland stone. Above the arched entrance is an Art Deco sculpture depicting winged bulls.
Chancery House	96 Paradise Street; 10 Hanover Street; 53.4020°N 2.9862°W		1890s	An office, originally the Gordon Smith Institute for Seamen, in red brick with a tiled roof. It has three storeys with an attic, and is in late Flemish Gothic style. Nine bays face Paradise Street, four bays form a curved façade to Hanover Street, with a curved bay to Price Street. Features include an octagonal tower, shaped gables with fluted pinnacles, and canted wooden oriel windows.
Gates of Liverpool Sailors' Home	Paradise Street; 53.4027°N 2.9861°W		1850s	The gates were made in Liverpool by Henry Pooley and Son to the designs of John Cunningham and installed at the Liverpool Sailors Home by 1852. Removed after the blitz of May 1941 and restored 8 August 2011 near the site of the Sailors' Home
—	57 Parr Street; 53.4010°N 2.9788°W		c. 1799	A warehouse for Thomas Parr, built behind his house, in brick with stone dressings with a slate roof. It has five storeys and a basement. On the street front are seven bays, with three bays on the sides. There are pediments on three sides. In the 1990s it was converted into student accommodation.
—	25 Pilgrim Street; 53.4002°N 2.9727°W		Early 19th century	A house in brick with stone dressings and slate roofs. It has three storeys, and is in three bays, with another bay facing Mount Street. The windows all have wedge lintels. The windows in the first floor are sashes; the rest are casements.
—	36 and 38 Pilgrim Street; 53.4002°N 2.9729°W		Early 19th century	This is a house and a shop in brick with stone dressings and slate roofs. They have three storeys, and are in three bays. The windows are sashes under wedge lintels.
Adelphi Hotel	Ranelagh Place; 53.4054°N 2.9777°W		1911–14	Designed by Frank Atkinson for the Midland Railway to replace an earlier hotel. It is constructed in Portland stone on a steel frame. The entrance front has seven storeys, and is in eleven bays. The windows in the first floor are round-headed; the others are rectangular. In the centre of the fourth and fifth floors are Ionic columns in front of three recessed bays. Inside are a series of public rooms in differing style of decoration.
—	19 Ranelagh Street; 53.40503°N 2.98064°W		1868	A tall narrow stone shop with five storeys, one bay wide. The ground floor contains a shop window. In the first floor is a Diocletian window with carving in the spandrels. The middle floor has a canted oriel window, and above are three-light windows. The gable is flanked by truncated pinnacles.
—	21 and 23 Ranelagh Street; 16 Cases Street; 53.4051°N 2.9805°W		Mid-19th century	A stuccoed shop in Italianate style. It has four storeys. There are three bays on Ranelagh Street, five on Cases Street, and a broader curved bay on the corner between them. On the ground floor are shop windows, with sashes above.
Midland Hotel	25, 27 and 29 Ranelagh Street; 53.4051°N 2.9802°W		Mid 19th century	A stuccoed public house with a slate roof. It is in four storeys, with one bay in Ranelagh Street, three curved bays on the corner, and two bays in Cases Street. The front of the building dates from about 1900, and is in Art Nouveau style. Its features include granite Ionic pilasters, bow windows, and decoration in copper and wrought iron. The interior contains panelling, engraved mirrors, columns, and rich plasterwork.
Central Hotel	31 Ranelagh Street; 53.4052°N 2.9800°W		1870s	A stuccoed public house with a slate roof. It has three storeys and an attic, and is in five bays. The central bay projects forward; it has a truncated pyramidal roof surmounted by a belvedere. The windows have architraves and keystones. Above the attic windows are pediments. The interior contains panelling, engraved mirrors, columns, and rich plasterwork.
Lewis's Building	Ranelagh Street; 53.4051°N 2.9785°W		1940s	A large department store, the third construction, rebuilt after severe damage in the Blitz of 1941. Closed in 2010 and since converted into separate units.
—	57b and 59–67 Renshaw Street; 4 and 6 Benson Street; 53.4034°N 2.9763°W		1820s	A range of shops with a stuccoed exterior. They are in three storeys with attics, and stretch for ten bays, curving around a corner. The ground floor contains shop fronts, with sash windows above.
Grand Central Hall	35–43 Renshaw Street; 53.4041°N 2.9767°W		1904–05	Designed by Bradshaw and Gass, this was built for the Liverpool Wesleyan Mission as a centre for religious and social meetings for Methodists. It is constructed in red brick and yellow terracotta, and has a slate roof. It incorporates Byzantine, Gothic, Jacobean, and Art Nouveau features. Over the main hall is a coffered saucer dome, at the entrance is a domed tower, and there are more domes elsewhere, some of them pointed.
—	1, 3 and 5 Rodney Street; 53.4035°N 2.9726°W		Early 19th century	A terrace of three houses, constructed in brick with stone dressings. They have three storeys with attics, and each house is in three bays. Each house has a round-headed doorway with a doorcase surrounded by fluted Doric columns and an entablature, with a semicircular fanlight above. The houses have first-floor balconies and sash windows.
—	2 Rodney Street; 53.4032°N 2.9732°W		Early 19th century	A brick house with stone dressings and a slate roof. It has three storeys and a stone basement, and is in three bays with a single-storey wing on each side. The windows are sashes. The entrance has a semicircular head, fluted Ionic columns, and semicircular fanlight.
—	4 Rodney Street; 53.4030°N 2.9732°W		Early 19th century	A brick house with stone dressings and a slate roof. It has three storeys and a stone basement, and is in four bays. The windows are sashes with wedge lintels. The entrance has a round head with a Doric doorcase. A modern dormer has been inserted in the roof.
—	6 and 8 Rodney Street; 53.4029°N 2.9732°W		Early 19th century	Two houses in brick with stone dressings and a slate roof. They have two storeys and a basement, and each house is in three bays. The windows are sashes with wedge lintels. The round-headed entrances are placed together and have Doric doorcases.
—	7 Rodney Street; 2 Maryland Street; 53.4025°N 2.9728°W		Late 18th century	A brick house with stone dressings and a slate roof. It has three storeys and a basement, with three bays on Rodney Street and six on Maryland Street. The sash windows have wedge lintels, and the round-headed doorways are flanked by fluted columns. Some windows are blind.
—	9–21 Rodney Street; 53.4021°N 2.9730°W		Late 18th century	A terrace of seven houses in brick, partly stuccoed, with stone dressings and a slate roof. They have three storeys and a basement, and each house has three bays. The windows have wedge lintels; most of them are sashes, with some casements. Features include Doric entrances and porticos, and a Mansard roof with pedimented dormers.
—	10 and 12 Rodney Street; 53.4028°N 2.9733°W		Early 19th century	Two houses in brick with stone dressings and slate roofs. They have three storeys with a basement, and each house is in three bays. The windows are sashes under wedge lintels. The entrances are round-headed with Doric doorcases.
—	14–18 Rodney Street; 53.4027°N 2.9733°W		Early 19th century	A terrace of houses in brick with stone dressings and a slate roof. They have three storeys and a basement, and each house is in three bays. All the windows have wedge lintels and most are sashes. No. 14 has a round-headed entrance with a Doric doorcase, surrounded by attached columns and an entablature. No. 16 has a modern shop front and casement windows in the second floor. The entrance to No. 18 has a pedimented Doric doorcase.
—	20–24 Rodney Street; 53.4024°N 2.9733°W		Late 18th century	Houses and shops in brick with stone dressings and a slate roof. They have three storeys and a basement, and are in three bays. Most of the windows are sashes. Nos. 20 and 22 have a shop window, and an entrance with an Ionic doorcase. No 24 also has a shop window; its doorcase is in Doric style, and the window above this is a casement.
—	26 and 28 Rodney Street; 53.4023°N 2.9734°W		Late 18th century	The two houses are in brick with stone dressings and slate roofs. They have three storeys with a basement, and each house is in three bays. The windows all have wedge lintels. In the first floor of No. 26 are a blind window and two casements; the other windows are sashes. The entrances are round-headed with Doric doorcases, and there are balconies on the first floor.
Roscoe House	27 Rodney Street; 53.4016°N 2.9731°W		Early 19th century	A brick house with stone dressings and a slate roof. It has three storeys and a stone basement, and is in five bays. The windows are sashes under wedge lintels. The central round-headed entrance has a Doric porch, over which is a balcony.
—	29 Rodney Street; 53.4015°N 2.9731°W		Early 19th century	A brick house with stone dressings and a slate roof. It has three storeys and a basement, and is in five bays. The windows are sashes under wedge lintels. The central round-headed entrance has a Doric porch, over which is a balcony.
—	30 Rodney Street; 53.4022°N 2.9734°W		Late 18th century	A brick house with stone dressings and a slate roof. It has three storeys and a basement, and is in three bays. The windows are sashes with wedge lintels. One window is blind. The entrance has a flat architrave and a cornice.
—	31 Rodney Street; 53.4014°N 2.9731°W		Early 19th century	A brick house with stone dressings and a slate roof. It has three storeys and a stone basement, and is in five bays. The windows are sashes under flat brick arches. The central entrance has a Doric doorcase, in front of which is a later Ionic porch with an open pediment.
Midland Bank (Mackenzies Whisky Bar)	32 Rodney Street; 45 Leece Street; 53.4021°N 2.9734°W		Late 18th century	A former bank in brick with stone dressings and a slate roof. On the ground floor are Ionic pilasters between casement windows. The windows in the Rodney Street face are sashes with wedge lintels. Those in the first floor of the Leece Street face are mullioned with Gibbs surrounds. Above the entrance are segmental pediments, an oriel window, and a balustrade.
—	33 Rodney Street; 53.4012°N 2.9729°W		Late 18th century	A brick house with stone dressings and a slate roof. It has three storeys, and is in four bays. The windows are sashes under flat brick arches. The entrance has a panelled architrave. Above it is a window, with an architrave, and also a frieze and a consoled cornice.
—	34 Rodney Street; 53.4018°N 2.9736°W		Late 18th century	A brick house with stone dressings and a slate roof. The side facing Leece Street is stuccoed, with pilasters and blind windows. It has three storeys and a basement, and is in five bays. The windows are sashes with brick flat arches. The round-headed entrance has a Doric doorcase.
—	35 Rodney Street; 53.4011°N 2.9733°W		c. 1783–84	Thought to be the oldest building to be completed in the street, this is a brick house with stone dressings and a slate roof. It has three storeys and a basement, and is in five bays. At its top is a pediment containing a roundel. The central entrance has a Doric doorcase, its entablature containing a frieze with swags. The window above this has an architrave with a frieze and a cornice, and over this is a blind window.
—	36 Rodney Street; 53.4017°N 2.9736°W		Early 19th century	A brick house with stone dressings and a slate roof. It has three storeys and a basement, and is in three bays. The windows are all sashes with wedge lintels. The round-headed entrance has an Ionic doorcase.
—	36A Rodney Street; 53.4016°N 2.9736°W		Early 19th century	A brick house with stone dressings and a slate roof. It has three storeys and a basement, and is in four bays. The windows are all sashes with wedge lintels. The entrance has a projecting Ionic porch and a glazed doorcase.
—	37 Rodney Street; 53.4010°N 2.9733°W	—	Late 18th century	A brick house with stone dressings and a slate roof. It has three storeys and a basement, and is in five bays. The windows are sashes under wedge lintels. The round-headed entrance has a Doric porch.
—	38 and 40 Rodney Street; 53.4014°N 2.9736°W		Early 19th century	Two houses in brick with stone dressings and slate roofs. They have three storeys and a basement, and each house is in three bays. The windows are sashes with wedge lintels. On the first floor are balconies.
—	39 Rodney Street; 53.4009°N 2.9733°W		Late 18th century	A brick house with stone dressings and a slate roof. It has three storeys and a basement, and is in four bays. The windows are sashes under wedge lintels. The round-headed entrance has a Doric doorcase.
—	41 Rodney Street; 53.4008°N 2.9733°W	—	Early 19th century	A brick house with stone dressings and a slate roof. It has three storeys and a stone basement. The windows are a mix of sashes and casements under brick flat arches. The round-headed entrance has a Doric doorcase with fluted pilasters.
—	42, 44 and 46 Rodney Street; 53.4013°N 2.9736°W		Late 18th century	Three houses in brick with stone dressings and slate roofs. They have three storeys and a basement, and each house is in three bays. The windows are sashes with wedge lintels. The round-headed entrances have Ionic doorcases.
—	43 Rodney Street; 53.4007°N 2.9734°W		Early 19th century	A brick house with stone dressings and a slate roof. It has three storeys and a basement, and is in three bays. The windows are sashes under wedge lintels. The round-headed doorway has a Doric doorcase with fluted columns. On the first floor are balconies.
—	45 Rodney Street; 53.4006°N 2.9734°W		Early 19th century	A brick house with stone dressings and a slate roof. It has three storeys and a basement, and is in four bays. The windows are sashes under wedge lintels. The round-headed entrance has a Ionic doorcase.
—	47 and 49 Rodney Street; 53.4004°N 2.9735°W		Late 18th century	A pair of houses in brick with stone dressings and a slate roof. They have three storeys and a basement, and each house has three bays. The windows have wedge lintels and all of them are sashes. Both houses have Doric doorcases, and No. 47 has rusticated quoins.
—	48 Rodney Street; 53.4012°N 2.9737°W		Early 19th century	A brick house with stone dressings and a slate roof. It has three storeys with a basement and an attic, and is in four bays. The attic and a portico were added later in the 19th century. The windows are sashes with wedge lintels. On the first floor is a balcony. The round-headed entrance has a Doric doorcase, and a Doric portico with an open segmental pediment. The attic has a Mansard roof and pedimented dormers.
—	49A Rodney Street; 53.4003°N 2.9735°W		Early 19th century	A brick house with stone dressings and a slate roof. It has three storeys and a basement, and is in three bays. The windows are sashes under wedge lintels. The round-headed doorway has a Doric doorcase with fluted columns. On the first floor are balconies, and the gable on the side has a pediment.
—	50, 52 and 54 Rodney Street; 53.4011°N 2.9737°W		Early 19th century	A terrace of three houses in brick with stone dressings and slate roofs. They have three storeys and a basement, and each house is in three bays. The windows are sashes with wedge lintels. Nos. 50 and 52 have round-headed entrances flanked by columns with foliated capitals. The head of No. 54 is straight with a wedge lintel. There are bowed balconies on each first floor.
—	51A-75 Rodney Street; 53.3997°N 2.9737°W		Early 19th century	A terrace of 13 brick houses with stone dressings and slate roofs. They have three storeys with a basement and an attic, and have three bays, except no 63, which has 5 bays under a pediment. All the windows have wedge lintels and are sashed, except for those to nos. 61, 63, 67 and 71 which have glazing bars. No 75 has four blind windows. The doorways are paired except for the ends and centre, and are round-headed with attached Doric columns and entablatures, except those to nos 51, 65, and 63 which have pediments and nos 55-59 which have straight heads. Nos. 51–57, 61–63 and 69 have iron balconies to first floor.
—	56 and 58 Rodney Street; 53.4009°N 2.9738°W		Early 19th century	Two houses in brick with stone dressings and slate roofs. Each has three storeys and a basement, and both houses are in two bays. The windows have wedge lintels. Most of them are sashes with casements on the second floor of No. 56. The round-headed entrances have Tuscan doorcases. On the first floor of No. 56 is a balcony.
—	60 Rodney Street; 53.4008°N 2.9739°W		Early 19th century	A brick house with stone dressings and a slate roof. It has three storeys and a basement, and is in two bays. The windows are sashes under wedge lintels. The entrance is round-headed, and has a panelled doorcase.
—	64–72 Rodney Street; 53.4005°N 2.9739°W		Early 19th century	A terrace of five brick houses with stone dressings and a slate roof. Each house is in two bays. All the windows are sashes under wedge lintels. Each house has a doorcase with attached columns and foliated capitals, and first floor balconies.
—	72A Rodney Street; 53.4001°N 2.9740°W		Early 19th century	A brick house with stone dressings and a slate roof, in three storeys and a basement. On the Rodney Street face are two bays, with six bays facing Knight Street. On the corner are quoins. All the windows are sashes under wedge lintels. There are also blind windows.
—	74 and 76 Rodney Street; 53.4000°N 2.9740°W		Late 18th century	Two houses in brick with stone dressings and slate roofs. They are in three storeys and a basement, each house being in two bays. The windows are sashes under wedge lintels. The entrances are round-headed with Doric doorcases.
—	78 Rodney Street; 53.3999°N 2.9741°W		Early 19th century	A brick house with stone dressings and a slate roof. It has three storeys and a basement, and is in five bays. The windows are sashes under wedge lintels. The central entrance is round-headed, and has a doorcase with flat pilasters.
—	80 Rodney Street; 53.3998°N 2.9741°W		Early 19th century	A brick house with stone dressings and a slate roof. It has three storeys and a basement, and is in three bays. The windows are sashes under wedge lintels. The entrance is round-headed, and is flanked by columns with fluted capitals. At one time it was the home of Lytton Strachey.
—	82 Rodney Street; 53.3997°N 2.9741°W		Early 19th century	A brick house with stone dressings and a slate roof. It has three storeys and a basement, and is in three bays. The windows are sashes under wedge lintels. The entrance is round-headed, and has an Ionic doorcase.
—	84 Rodney Street; 53.3997°N 2.9741°W		Early 19th century	A brick house with stone dressings and a slate roof. It has three storeys and a basement, and is in four bays. The windows are sashes with wedge lintels. The entrance is round-headed and has a Doric doorcase, with fluted columns.
—	86 and 88 Rodney Street; 53.3996°N 2.9742°W		Early 19th century	Two houses in brick with stone dressings and slate roofs. They are in three storeys and a basement. No. 84 has three bays, and No. 86 has five. The windows are sashes under wedge lintels. Both houses have an entrance with Doric doorcases flanked by fluted columns. The left side of No. 86 is in three bays and has a pedimented gable.
K6 Telephone Kiosk	Rodney Street; 53.40351°N 2.97293°W		1935	A K6 type telephone kiosk, designed by Giles Gilbert Scott. It has a square plan, is in cast iron and has a domed top. The top panels contain unperforated crowns.
Lamp posts	Rodney Street; 53.4030°N 2.9730°W		Early 19th century	There are 14 lamp posts in cast iron that have retained their original lanterns and cylindrical chimneys. They are placed outside St Andrew's Church, and in front of houses numbered 5, 13, 33A, 45, 51A, 55, 2, 14, 38, 54, 68, 78 and 88.
Mackenzie Monument	Rodney Street; 53.40276°N 2.97266°W		1868	A monument to William Mackenzie, railway contractor. It consists of a granite pyramid. It has a blind entrance containing a granite plaque, surrounded by upright supporting a lintel.
Gate piers and front wall to Church of St. Andrew	Rodney Street; 53.40306°N 2.97283°W		1823	The gate piers and the front wall to the Church of St. Andrew are in stone. There are four gate piers at the entrance and two on the corners, all with panelled sides and pedimented caps.
Sunday School	Rodney Street; 53.4032°N 2.9723°W		1872	A ruined building in the churchyard of the Church of Saint Andrew. Designed by H. H. Vale in Italianate style, it is in a single-storey, has an L-shaped plan, and is stuccoed. On the west is a Venetian window, flanked by porches each with dentilled eaves, a cornice and a pediment.
Royal Court Theatre	Roe Street; 53.4074°N 2.9813°W		1938	Designed by J.B. Hutchins in a modernist style, it is built of brick with dressings of Aberdeen granite to a rectangular plan on corner site. The long side is on Roe Street with a segmentally-curved north-western corner.
—	45–51 Seel Street; 53.4022°N 2.9793°W		Late 18th century	A terrace of four houses in brick with stone dressings and a slate roof. They have three storeys with basements. No. 47 has three bays, and the others have two. The round-headed doorways are paired, and the sash windows have wedge lintels.
—	48, 50 and 52 Seel Street; 53.4024°N 2.9805°W		Early 19th century	A terrace of three houses in brick with stone dressings and a slate roof. They have three storeys, and each house is in two bays. All the windows are sashes with wedge lintels. The entrances are paired with pediments.
The Watchmakers	60 Seel Street; 30 Slater Street53.4022°N 2.9802°W		c.1850	Former watchmaker's works built in brick with cement rendering and dressings and a Welsh slate roof. There are 3 storeys with cellars with 3 bays to Slater Street and 2 bays to Seel Street on right return.
—	76 Seel Street; 53.4017°N 2.9787°W		Early 19th century	A brick house with stone dressings and a slate roof. It has three storeys and is in three bays. All the windows have wedge lintels. Those in the second floor are casements; the others are sashes. The doorcase has pilasters, a panelled tympanum, and a cornice.
Pogue Mahone pub	77 Seel Street; 53.4013°N 2.9768°W		c. 1800–05	Town house c. 1800, converted into a public house later in the 19th century. It is a stuccoed building in three storeys and four bays. The windows have decorated architraves, including pediments, and friezes carved with laurels.
—	78 Seel Street; 53.4017°N 2.9787°W		1830s	A warehouse, possibly originally a school, in brick with stone dressings and a slate roof. It has two storeys and a basement, and is in five bays. At the top is a pediment containing a plaque. The windows are casements.
—	79, 81 and 83 Seel Street; 53.4011°N 2.9765°W		Early 19th century	Three houses in brick with stone dressings and a slate roof. No 79 has four bays, and the other have three. No 79 is stuccoed, has casement windows in the ground floor, and a Doric doorcase. All the other windows are sashes with wedge lintels. The doorcase of No 81/83 is in Composite style.
—	94-104 Seel Street; 53.4010°N 2.9766°W		1790s	A terrace of six houses, with three storeys, each house having two bays. They are constructed in brick with stone dressings and slate roofs. Some of the windows are original sashes; others are later inserted casements. The interiors have been altered, but some earlier features have survived.
Saint Peter's Roman Catholic Church	Seel Street; 53.4018°N 2.9790°W		1788	Now closed, this was the oldest Roman Catholic church in Liverpool. It is a stuccoed building, in two storeys and six bays. The two-storey porch projects forwards, and incorporates a pediment, fluted Doric columns, a frieze and a cornice.
City Education Office	14 Sir Thomas Street; 53.4080°N 2.9866°W		1897–98	An office building designed by Charles E. Deacon in French Renaissance style. It is built in stone on a granite base, and has three storeys, a basement and an attic. The windows in the ground floor are arched and surrounded by pilasters and a pediment. Above are two two-storey oriel windows; the other windows are mullioned and transomed. On the front are two friezes, and at the top of the building is a cornice, and three ornamented dormers, two of them with round pediments, balconies and lions' heads.
—	19–23 Sir Thomas Street; 45 Whitechapel; 53.4069°N 2.9850°W		1860s	Stuccoed shops in three storeys with a slate roof. Along Sir Thomas Street are six bays, with two bays on Whitechapel, and a canted bay on the corner between them. All the windows are sashes, some of which are round-headed. On Sir Thomas Street are two balconies with pediments above.
Minerva Chambers	20 Sir Thomas Street; 53.4079°N 2.9865°W		1860s	Office building in stone with slate roof having four storeys plus basement and attic. There are seven bays of varying widths; the basement, first and second floor bays are separated by attached shafts with foliated capitals supporting a cornice.
Statue of Major General William Earle	St. George's Plateau; 53.40807°N 2.98011°W		1887	The statue is attached to the southeast angle of St George's Hall. It is in bronze, by Charles Bell Birch, and shows Major General William Earle standing over an African shield.
Statue of Disraeli	St. George's Plateau; 53.40857°N 2.97977°W		1883	The statue of Benjamin Disraeli stands on the steps of St George's Hall. It is in bronze, and was executed by C. B. Birch.
Prince Albert Monument	St. George's Plateau; 53.40822°N 2.97963°W		1866	This is a bronze statue by Thomas Thornycroft on a stone plinth depicting Prince Albert on a horse.
War memorial	St. George's Plateau; 53.40853°N 2.97948°W		1930	This consists of a simple block with a bronze relief on each side, one side depicting mourners, with marching soldiers on the other side. It was designed by L. B.Budden and executed by H. Tyson Smith.
Queen Victoria Monument	St. George's Plateau; 53.40883°N 2.97933°W		1869	This is a bronze statue by Thomas Thornycroft on a stone plinth depicting Queen Victoria on a horse.
Four lions	St. George's Plateau; 53.40859°N 2.97925°W		1856	The two pairs of stone carvings of recumbent lions stand to the east of St George's Hall. They were designed by Sir Charles Cockerell, and executed by William Grinsell Nicholl.
Lamp standards	St. George's Plateau; 53.40909°N 2.97946°W		Mid-19th century	The 41 lamp standards are in cast iron and each contains a depiction of three dolphins twined around the base. They were designed by Sir Charles Cockerell, and are placed between the west side of St George's Hall and Lime Street.
Lodge, St James Cemetery	St. James’ Road; 53.39534°N 2.97234°W		1827	Designed by John Foster, junior, this is a stone building in two storeys with three bays. The ground floor is rusticated with a projecting porch. At the angles are pilasters, with an entablature at the top.
Gateway, St James Cemetery	St. James’ Road; 53.39541°N 2.97285°W		1827	Designed by John Foster, junior, the stone gateway has a rusticated archway with pilasters, and a cornice.
Carriage ramps and catacombs, St James Cemetery	St. James’ Road; 53.39849°N 2.97160°W	Carriage ramps Catacombs	1827	These consist of intersecting sloping carriageways with rusticated retaining walls containing catacombs. They were designed by John Foster, junior.
Rock-cut arch, St James Cemetery	St. James’ Road; 53.39840°N 2.97323°W		1824	A rusticated archway cut through natural rock forming a northern entrance to the cemetery, designed by John Foster, junior.
Huskisson Monument, St James Cemetery	St. James’ Road; 53.39703°N 2.97195°W		1833–34	The monument to William Huskisson was designed by John Foster, junior. It is a stone circular structure in Greek Revival style, based on the Choragic Monument of Lysicrates at Athens. It incorporates a Corinthian colonnade, and has a shallow dome surmounted by a cross.
Saint Vincent de Paul Presbytery	St. James’ Street; 53.3971°N 2.9791°W		1856 (probable)	The presbytery to the Church of St Vincent de Paul was designed by E. W. Pugin. It is constructed in brick and stone, with a slate roof, and is in Gothic Revival style. It is in two storeys, and has gabled attics. It has an oriel window, the other windows being mullioned.
Forwood Monument	St. John's Gardens; 53.40848°N 2.98077°W		1903	A monument to Sir Arthur Forwood, a local merchant and politician, designed by George Frampton. It consists of a bronze figure on a stone pedestal.
Retaining wall, gatepiers, and terrace wall	St. John's Gardens; 53.40858°N 2.98119°W		1904	The garden was laid out by Thomas Shelmerdine, who designed the stone walls and gate piers. The walls have a moulded plinth and coping. The gate piers are rusticated and have entablatures.
Lester Monument	St. John's Gardens; 53.40918°N 2.98146°W		1907	A monument to Canon T. Major Lester, a founder of children's charities, designed by George Frampton. It consists of a bronze figure, standing and holding a child, on a stone pedestal.
Gladstone Monument	St. John's Gardens; 53.40879°N 2.98109°W		1904	The monument to W. E. Gladstone was designed by Sir Thomas Brock. It consists of the bronze figure of Gladstone, standing and holding rolls of parchment and books, on a stone plinth with female figures depicting virtues.
King's Liverpool Regiment Monument	St. John's Gardens; 53.40888°N 2.98162°W		1905	Commemorating the service of the King's Liverpool Regiment in the South African War, it was designed by Sir William Goscombe John. It is in white stone with a bronze wreath, and consists of a figure of Britannia, flanked by soldiers, with a drummer boy behind.
Rathbone Monument	St. John's Gardens; 53.40896°N 2.98054°W		1899–1900	A bronze monument on a stone plinth to William Rathbone. It was designed by George Frampton showing Rathbone as a robed figure. Around the plinth are reliefs depicting his philanthropic works.
Balfour Monument	St. John's Gardens; 53.40914°N 2.98087°W		1889	A bronze statue on a stone pedestal to Alexander Balfour who died in 1886. It was designed by Albert Bruce-Joy.
Nugent Monument	St John's Gardens; 53.40859°N 2.98173°W		1905	A monument to James Nugent by F. W. Pomeroy. It consists of a standing bronze figure in an attitude of blessing, and a ragged boy, on a stone pedestal.
St John's House	7–12 St John’s Lane; 53.4083°N 2.9821°W		1896–98	Built for Pearl Life Assurance, this office building was designed by Alfred Waterhouse. It is in stone with a granite ground floor and a slate roof. The building has three storeys and attics. Five bays face St John's Lane, and three face Tryon Street. On the corner between them is an octagonal tower and spire. In the ground floor are round-headed arches containing shop fronts, the first and second floors have paired sash windows, and in the attic are three-light sash windows under gables containing tracery.
Telephone Kiosk	St John's Lane; 53.40862°N 2.98221°W		1935	A K6 type telephone kiosk, designed by Giles Gilbert Scott. It has a square plan, is in cast iron and has a domed top. The top panels contain unperforated crowns.
—	4 Slater Street; 53.4032°N 2.9790°W		Late 18th century	A shop built in brick, partly stuccoed, with stone dressings and a slate roof. It is in three storeys and has a symmetrical front of five bays, plus an additional bay to the left. In the ground floor are six round-arched openings, each of which is surrounded by elaborate decoration. A cornice decorated with a Greek key design runs above the ground floor. In the upper two storeys most of the windows are sashes, with one casement window.
Granite House	6–20 Stanley Street; 53.4075°N 2.9877°W		c. 1882	The building houses offices and was designed by G. E. Grayson and constructed in granite. There were originally three gables, but the middle one is missing. The building is in four storeys with a basement, and stretches for nine bays. Along the ground floor are five entrances. Most of the windows have three lights, other than those next to the entrances, which are paired, and those in the third floor, which have four lights. Between the windows are cylindrical columns.
Mornington Terrace	29–37 Upper Duke Street; 53.3992°N 2.9734°W		c. 1839–40	A terrace of five houses in three storeys and a basement. Each house has three bays, the middle house projecting forward with a pediment. The terrace is constructed in brick with stone dressings, including the base, a string course, a cornice, and a parapet. The roof is slated, and the windows are sashes.
Railings and piers to the Oratory	Upper Duke Street; 53.39881°N 2.97355°W		1829	Outside The Oratory are cast iron railings with spear heads standing on a low stone wall. The gate piers are panelled, and have anthemion acroteria on caps with pediments.
Bank of Ireland	25 and 27 Victoria Street; 53.4072°N 2.9873°W		1870s	The bank is built in brick with stone dressings, and is in four storeys. There are five bays on Victoria Street and eleven bays on Stanley Street.
National Conservation Centre	42 Victoria Street; 53.4077°N 2.9848°W		1874	This was built as a warehouse for the Midland Railway, and designed by Henry Sumners. It is constructed in brick with stone dressings, and has a slate roof. Externally it is expressed in three and four storeys. In 2005–06 it was converted into the National Conservation Centre for National Museums Liverpool.
Bank of Liverpool	45 Victoria Street; 24 Sir Thomas Street; 53.4076°N 2.9863°W		1881–82	A bank designed by G. E. Grayson. It is in stone on a granite base, and has three storeys with a basement and attic. There are seven bays on Victoria Street, and five bays on Sir Thomas Street. The ground floor contains casement windows, with sashes above.
Crown Buildings	57 and 59 Victoria Street; 53.4084°N 2.9845°W		1886	An office, built in brick with stone dressings, with a slate roof. It is in four storeys, with four bays on Victoria Street, and seven bays on Preston Street. At the corner is an octagonal turret with a short spire and an iron finial.
Jerome Buildings and Carlisle Buildings	61–71 Victoria Street; 53.4085°N 2.9843°W		1883–85	These are office buildings built by John Cragg, using ironwork from his foundry, for H. Rankin. They form one building, are built in brick with sandstone dressings, and have a tiled roof. The building is in three storeys with an attic and basement, and has six bays.
Abbey Buildings	73–79 Victoria Street; 53.4086°N 2.9840°W		1885	An office building and warehouse, constructed in brick with stone dressings, with a slate roof. It is in four storeys with an attic, and has five bays. It is in Tudor Revival, and has three gables, and an oriel window.
Baltic Fleet Public House	Wapping; 53.3986°N 2.9867°W		1860	A public house in stone and pebbledashing with a slate roof. It is in two and three storeys, and has a triangular plan. Between the windows are Tuscan pilasters.

== See also ==
- Architecture of Liverpool
