= Crown Hotel, Liverpool =

Listed pub in Merseyside, England

Crown Hotel
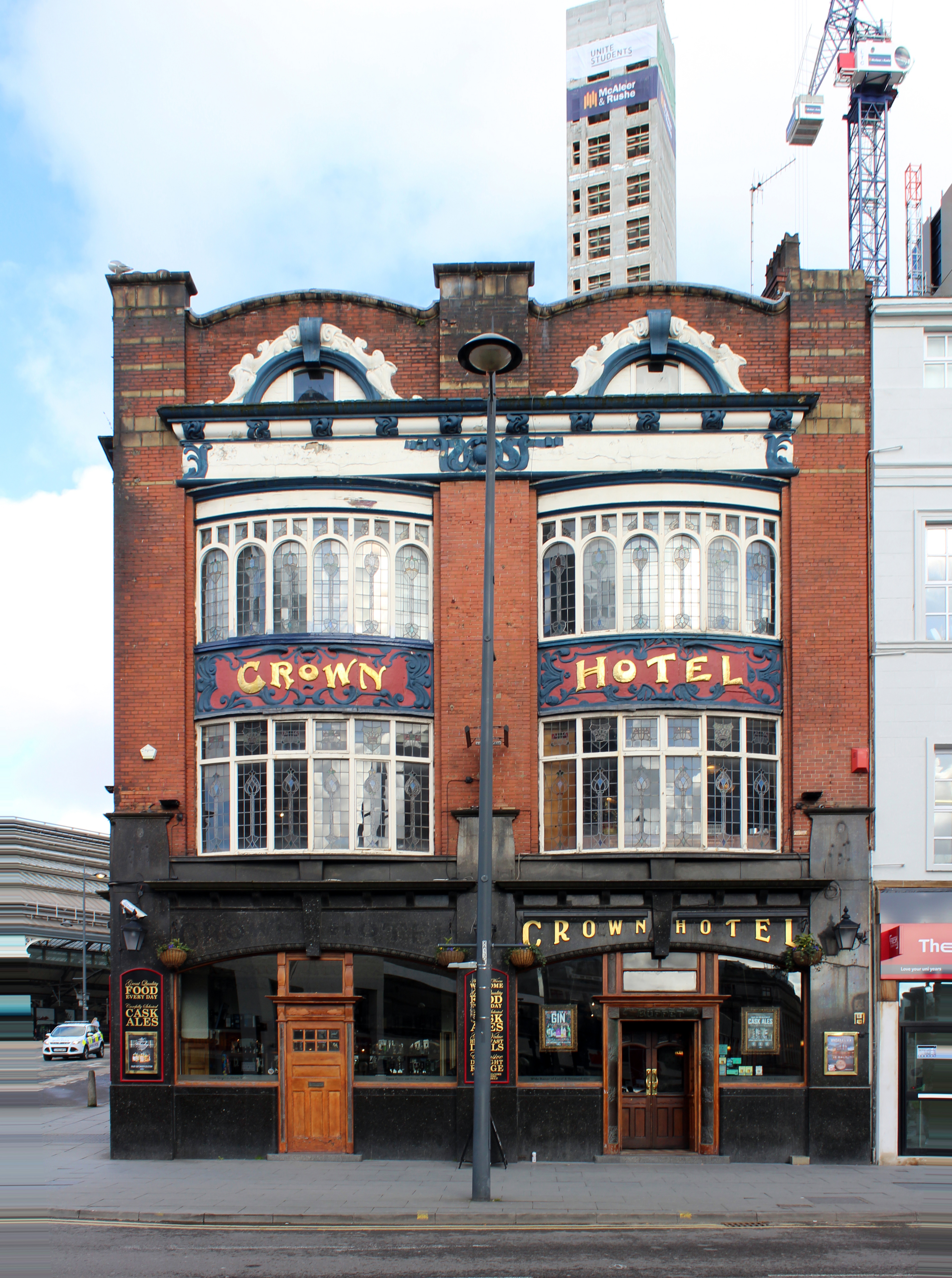
- The pub in 2018
- Alternative names: The Crown

General information
- Type: Public house
- Location: 43 Lime Street, Liverpool, England
- Coordinates: 53°24′24″N 2°58′44″W
- Year built: 1905; 121 years ago
- Owner: Mitchells & Butlers

Design and construction
- Designations

Listed Building – Grade II
- Official name: Crown Hotel
- Designated: 14 March 1975
- Reference no.: 1208085

Website
- thecrownliverpool.co.uk

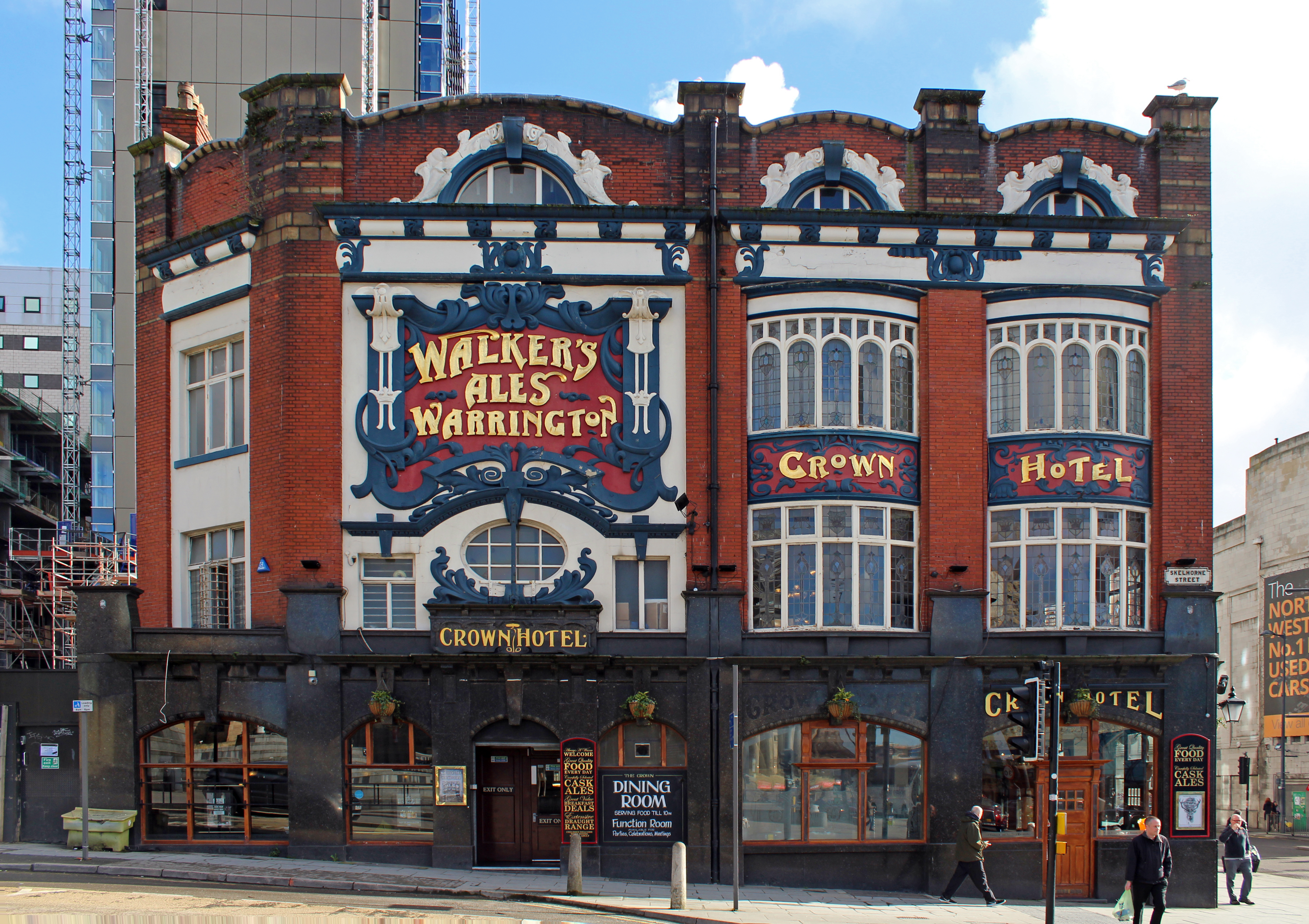
Side view, on Skelhorne Street

The Crown Hotel is a Grade II listed public house on Lime Street in Liverpool, England. Built in 1905 for Walkers of Warrington in the Art Nouveau style, it is among Liverpool's most ornate Edwardian pubs. Its interior is recognised by the Campaign for Real Ale as being of "outstanding national historic importance" and is included in the National Inventory of Historic Pub Interiors.

== History ==
The public house was built in 1905 for Walkers of Warrington in the Art Nouveau style and is comparable in scale and decoration to the Philharmonic and The Vines, both developed by Liverpool's Cains Brewery.

On 14 March 1975, the Crown Hotel was designated a Grade II listed building. The pub is regarded by the Campaign for Real Ale (CAMRA) as having an interior of "outstanding national historic importance" and is rated three stars on its National Inventory of Historic Pub Interiors. As of March 2026 the freehold was owned by Mitchells & Butlers.

== Architecture ==
=== Exterior ===
The building is constructed of brick with stucco detailing and a marble-faced ground floor. Designed in the Art Nouveau style, it has three storeys and an attic level arranged on two principal elevations. The ground floor is framed by a series of broad arches and vertical supports, with entrances and windows set beneath a projecting horizontal band. The upper floors feature projecting curved bays separated by narrow vertical strips, while the attic contains small arched windows set within elaborate surrounds. A shaped parapet runs across the top of the building. Decorative inscriptions include the words "Crown Hotel" between the first and second-floor windows on both the Lime Street and Skelhorne Street elevations, while a panel on the Skelhorne Street frontage bears the inscription "Walkers Ales Warrington".

=== Interior ===
The interior is particularly notable for its richly decorated ceilings and other ornamental features. The building originally contained several separate rooms, although later alterations removed most of the internal divisions and created a larger open drinking area at the front. Evidence of the former layout survives in blocked or disused doorways.

The entrance from Lime Street leads through a vestibule containing decorative etched glass panels and an embellished ceiling. The principal front room retains carved timber panelling, a marble frieze, a large decorative fireplace finished with coloured tiles, and a bar counter with an unusual copper front. Some historic fittings survive, including fixed seating and etched glass, although parts of the bar back and other features have been altered or replaced.

The rear room retains etched-glass doors, stained and leaded glazing, extensive timber panelling, a decorative ceiling, and a fireplace with a timber surround and mirrored overmantel. Fixed seating and some fittings appear to date from later refurbishments.

An internal staircase leads to the former billiard room on the upper floor, now used as a dining area. This space includes a glazed dome, decorative plasterwork, stained and leaded windows, and later bar and seating installations.

== See also ==
- Grade II listed buildings in Liverpool-L1
