= ABC Cinema, Liverpool =

Former cinema in Liverpool

ABC Cinema
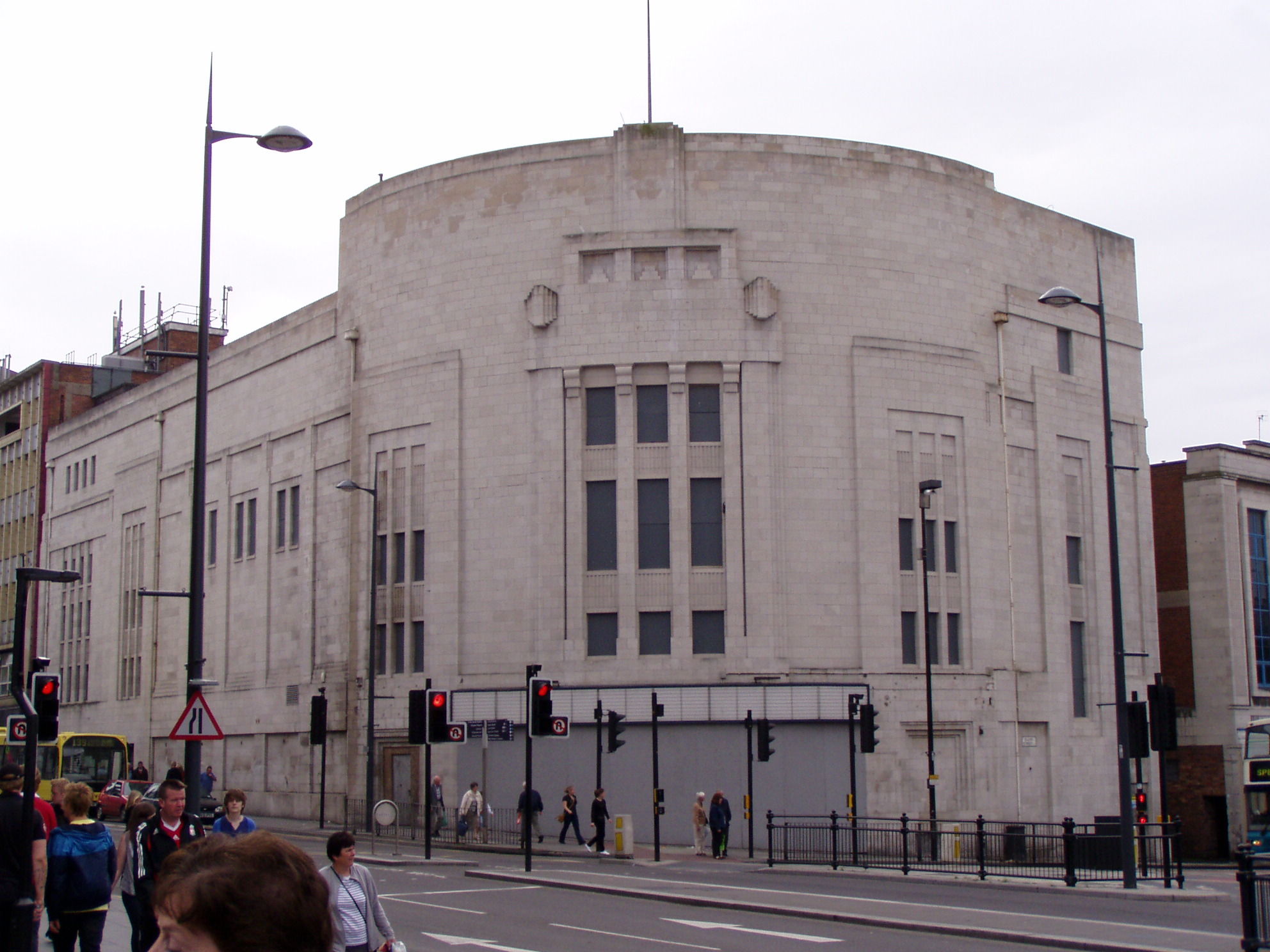
- ABC Cinema

General information
- Architectural style: Art Deco
- Location: Lime Street, Liverpool, United Kingdom
- Coordinates: 53.4062°N 2.9792°W
- Completed: 1931
- Cost: £200,000

Technical details
- Floor count: 6

Design and construction
- Architects: A. E. Shannon; William R. Glen

The ABC Cinema is a Grade II listed building located on Lime Street, Liverpool, England. The cinema was once a part of Liverpool's entertainment scene until closing in 1998. Since then, the building has lain empty with plans announced in 2016 for its redevelopment into an £11 million music venue.

== History ==
Built for ABC Cinemas, the six-story building was designed by William R. Glen and Alfred Ernest Shennan for £200,000 with a maximum capacity of 1,835 people. Originally opened in 1931 as "The Forum", ABC Cinemas renamed it in 1971 to the "ABC Cinema" and later split into three individual screens in 1982. In 1986 the cinema was yet again renamed, becoming "The Cannon" until its closure in 1998. The building has been temporarily reopened for use as an exhibition space for the Liverpool Biennial in 2016.
