= St Peter's Roman Catholic Church, Liverpool =

Former church in Liverpool, England

Coordinates: 53.402°N 2.979°W

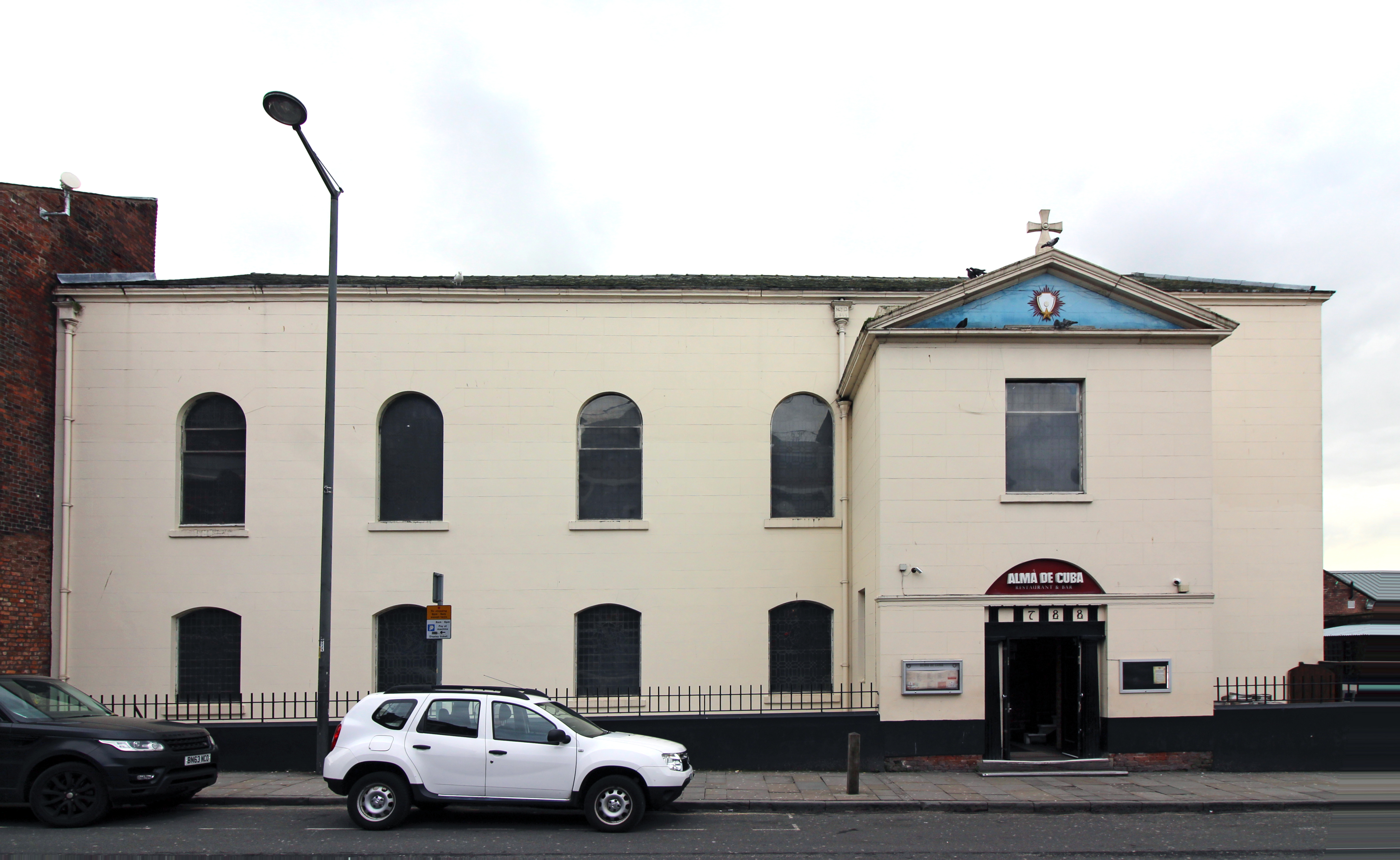
St. Peter's Roman Catholic Church

St. Peter's Roman Catholic Church is a former church in Seel Street, Liverpool, Merseyside, England, that was transformed into a restaurant and bar called Alma de Cuba ("the soul of Cuba"). On 14 November 2024, the building reopened as St Peter's Tavern.

Until its closure, St. Peter's was the oldest Catholic Church in Liverpool. It is recorded in the National Heritage List for England as a designated Grade II listed building.

In September 2024 it was announced that the building had been acquired by The 1936 Pub Company that intended to renovate and reopen under the name St Peter's Tavern.

== History ==
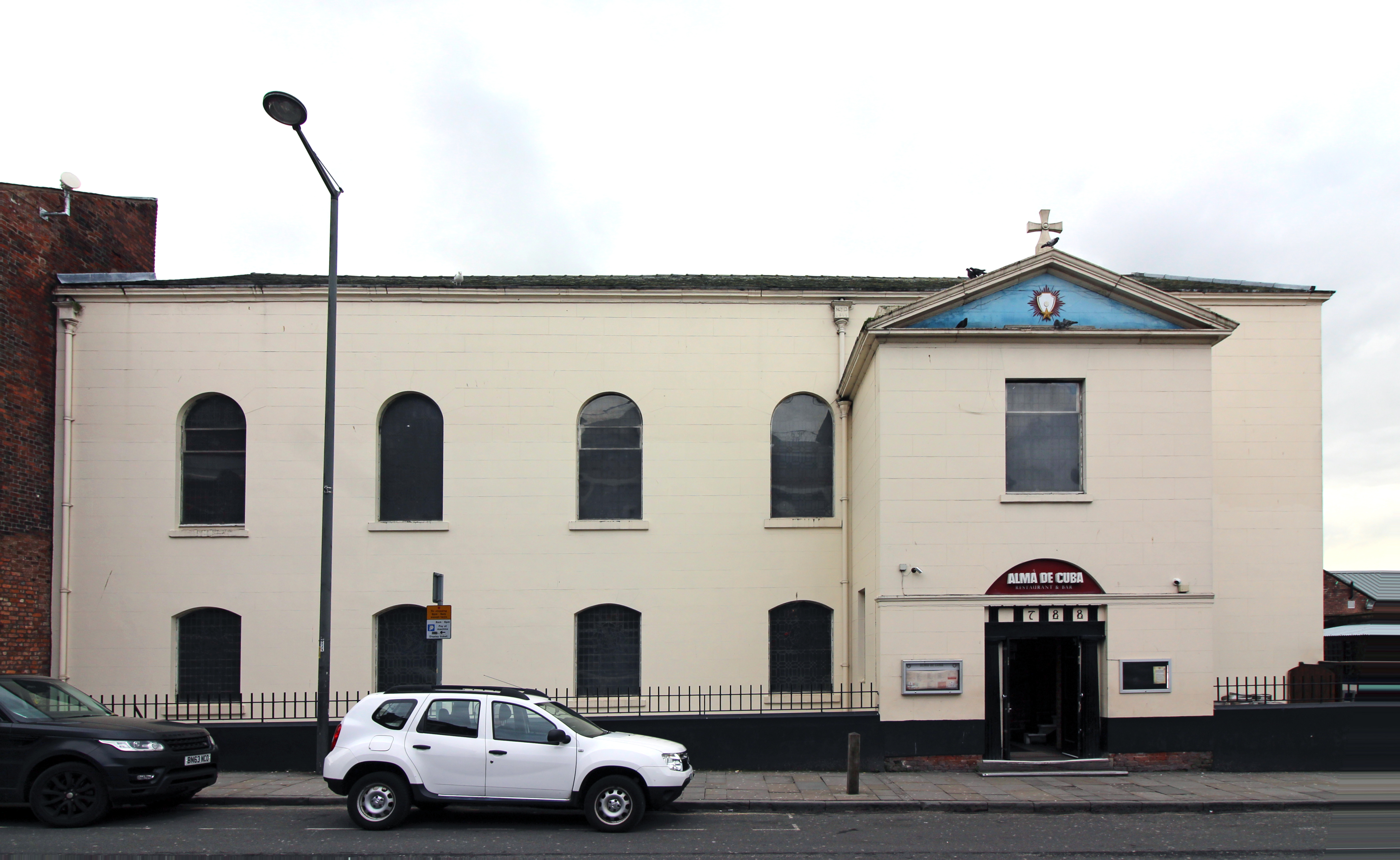
The exterior of former St Peter's Church

Some milestones in St Peter's history include:

- 7 September 1788 - opening of St Peter's.
- 11 September 1788 - The 'Liverpool Advertiser' reports that "On Sunday last, a new Roman Catholic Chapel in Seel St. was opened with high Mass: and a sermon by the Rev. Mr. McDonald."
- 28 September 1788 - first baptisms performed, with the first entry: "Was baptised Mary, daughter of John and Mary Goosse; Sponsors, Paul Hewit and Margaret Yates".
- 1 April 1789 - perpetual lease granted by the City Corporation, "to Father McDonald and successors, of the site of St. Peter's Chapel, so long as a place of worship." A separate lease granted for the house and schools, at an annual ground rent of twelve pence.
- 29 July 1814 - Death of Fr Archibald Benedict McDonald, O.S.B.. On the Founder's Monument was inscribed: "In the vaults of this chapel are deposited the remains of the Rev. Archibald MacDonald, who departed this life on the 29 July 1814, aged 78 years. The founder of this chapel, and for a period of 26 years its liberal, intelligent and revered pastor, to whose memory the Catholics of Liverpool erect this monument. - R.I.P."
- 1817/1818 - The church is enlarged. The enlargement includes the porch and the gallery, and possibly encompassed part of the Presbytery.
- 1817 - The opening of St Peter's Schools in Seel Street, the "first Catholic School founded". In fact the school probably transferred from a smaller school founded opposite the church in 1789.
- 1840 - Fr Vincent Glover, O.S.B., died of fever on 6 August, contracted whilst attending the sick. Fr Glover had served the Parish for 22 years.
- 1845 - A major extension to the church takes place. Next to St. Peter's Church stood the house in which the priests had lived for over 60 years. The main part of the floors were removed and the wall between the church and the house was taken down. The result created the Sanctuary (the Altar area of the current church). The front room of the house then became the Sacristy (apparently currently used by the Alma de Cuba restaurant as a storeroom). The extension was carried out under the auspices of Fr James Francis Appleton, O.S.B., the Parish Priest at the time.
- 1847 - In 1846 and 1847 hundreds of thousands of Irish immigrants landed in Liverpool to escape the famine, and they swarmed to the poorer quarters of the town. An epidemic of typhus began ("the Great Plague") and at a Vestry Meeting on 8 June 1847 it was reported that 57,701 cases of typhus had been dealt with (compared with 420 cases in the corresponding period of the previous year). Fr Appleton, O.S.B., died of typhus fever contracted whilst administering to the sick on 26 May 1847. The English Benedictine Congregation History records that "[He] was gradually recovering when contrary to Doctor's orders he very injudiciously took some Whisky which acted like poison on his constitution and terminated his life."
- 1854 - The last burial takes place in St. Peter's vaults.
- 1856 - Fr Davey, O.S.B. and '400 children' walk in the "Peace Procession" to celebrate the end of the Crimean War.
- 1864 - The Lady Chapel was built in memory of Fr Benedict Bonney, O.S.B..
- 1872 - Fr Scarisbrook, O.S.B. was consecrated Bishop of Mauritius at St. Peter's.
- 1898 - The Lady Altar is erected to commemorate the 50th Anniversary of Fr Anderson's entering the Order of St. Benedict.
- 1920 - Electric light installed for the first time in the Church and Church redecorated. Funds for this refurbishment were raised by sources including an "extraordinarily successful" Grand Bazaar held 14–16 October 1920. The cost of this work entailed "an outlay of several hundred pounds". This work was undertaken during the period when Fr Basil Primavesi, O.S.B., was Parish Priest.
- 1934 - Data from the 1934 Parish Census states that there were 622 families in the parish, with a total of 2,823 Catholic "souls" (i.e. people).
- 1938 – On 19 June 1938 St Peter's celebrated its 150th anniversary. The Jubilee Mass was celebrated by Archbishop Downey, and hundreds of people attended the event. The streets around St Peter's were extensively decorated to mark this big event as is illustrated by the photos taken by Fr D’Andria and which are now held in the Liverpool Records Office. The photos show that there were very extensive decorations in Pitt Street, the Lydia Ann Flats, and other streets including Seel Street, Sparling Street and Slater Street.
- 1940-1941 - Fr Louis Joseph D'Andria, O.S.B., writes a series of letters to Fr Kevin Byrne, O.S.B., Abbot of Ampleforth Abbey about life in Liverpool during the Blitz. These letters are subsequently published in the year 2000 by the North West Catholic History Society in a book. Fr D'Andria left St Peter's after the heavy bombing of May 1941. Fr D'Andria was active in collecting historical and contemporary material from the St Peter's and the surrounding districts from his arrival in the Parish in 1930. These materials were deposited at the Liverpool Records Office upon his death. D'Andria was a keen photographer, and at some stage the photos taken by D'Andria of the church and the surrounding districts were separated from the main D'Andria Collection and integrated into the Record Office's general collection of photographs of Liverpool. Some more detail is given in the section on The Blitz below.
- 1962 - Fr Martin Rocheford, O.S.B., deposits the pre-1837 Parish Registers at the Liverpool Records Office.
- 1976 - transferred to the Polish Community and for a short time was known as Our Lady of Czestochowa.
- 1978 - The Parish is closed and falls into a period of disuse.
- 1978 - The Parish records are deposited in the Liverpool Records office by Fr Everest. The Parish Registers were transferred to St. Vincent de Paul's RC Church.
- 1993 - The Church is deconsecrated.
- 20 November 2003 - A press release is issued stating that funding has been approved to convert the Grade-II listed building of St Peter's Church into high-specification offices by Urban Splash. Funding is received from the EU (£260k), the North West Development Agency (£190k) and Urban Splash itself (£450k).
- 7 January 2004 - The BBC report that developers have discovered the body of Fr Bede Brewer, O.S.B. in the crypt of St Peter's. Dom Bede Brewer was one of the founding members of Ampleforth College in 1802, and President of English Benedictines. The Liverpool Echo also indicate that Ampleforth Abbey was keen to reclaim all of the monastic bodies in St Peter's crypt.
- 2004 - Fr Brewer was reburied at Ampleforth Abbey in July 2004 along with the remains of 6 other monks. In total there were 22 bodies in the crypt of St Peter's (8 monks and 14 lay people). In addition to Dom Bede Brewer, the monks reburied at Ampleforth Abbey according to the Yorkshire Post were monks James Calderbank, Denis Allerton, Benedict Glover, Francis Fairclough, Gregory Robinson and Joseph Glover. However, St Peter's founder, Fr McDonald, was the first buried in St Peter's crypt and his coffin was not clearly labelled (unlike the seven other monks). Due to this fact and other pressures (such as time) it was not possible to positively identify Fr McDonald's remains, and so he was reburied along with the remains of 14 lay people in Ford Cemetery in Litherland, Merseyside.
- 2005 - a bar and restaurant, Alma de Cuba, opens in St Peter's Church.
- 2024 - The former Alma de Cuba reopens as "St Peter's Tavern" by The 1936 Pub Company, owned by Rob Gutmann who had founded Alma de Cuba.

== The Blitz ==
St Peter's was damaged a number of times during the Blitz of 1940–1941. One example of the damage can be found in Fr Louis D’Andria's letter of 22 December 1940 to the Abbot of Ampleforth Abbey (Fr Kevin H Byrne, O.S.B.). Referring to the previous night D’Andria wrote: ‘To the Guild Room – doors blown in, big balk of timber across the entrance, stairs covered with sticky chemicals and heaps of rubbish…. To sacristy where sacristans were carrying on as usual despite a hole in the sacristy roof, and other damage. In the church Frs. Bruno and Chad were in the gallery examining a hole in the roof on the street side of the organ. Two more holes in the Lady Chapel, and a big stone in the sanctuary which had come through the skylight’.

In D’Andria's letter of 6 May 1941 he recounts events of Sunday 4 May 1941: ‘So it seemed the fire would spread to the church and the house. Bruno said we must clear out so we took the registers etc. into the road….I saw our roof definitely on fire.’

In his letter of 9 May 1941 D’Andria tells Fr Abbot (i.e. Fr Byrne, O.S.B.): ‘Church has notice ‘closed till further notice. Mass on Sunday at [Notre Dame Convent] Mount Pleasant.’ Suggest carrying on at St Peter's but Bruno said it was impossible.’ The Church Notice Book recorded that ‘The church was too wrecked a condition for Mass after the first raids of the first week of May.’ D'Andria went on to quote his Rector, Fr Francis Bruno Dawson, O.S.B. who announced 'No Church, no congregation, no house, no school, no good staying here.'

Masses were eventually restored, with one weekday Mass from 25 May 1941 at 08:00, rising to two Masses the following week, and by 12 June (The Feast of Corpus Christi), three Masses were said.

Damage to the priests’ house (St Peter's Priory, 55 Seel Street) included complete destruction of the 3rd floor of the building and partial damage to the 2nd floor, and the repairs which were finally undertaken reinstated the 2nd floor, and not the 3rd floor. In total 7 bedrooms were destroyed, and only 3 remained, ‘two with rain pouring in, in bad weather’. On 11 September 1944 The [Liverpool] City Architect and Director of Housing reported that the 2nd floor was covered with a temporary lean-to corrugated iron roof which was "leaking badly", and that "the domestic servants’ sleeping accommodation is deplorable (one sleeps in the Kitchen and one in the Basement Air Raid Shelter)."

Photographs which were taken in May 1941 by Dom Louis D’Andria, OSB, show significant damage to the Presbytery and show the Sanctuary (Altar area) covered in debris following an air raid.

St Peter's Church Guildhall was located on Park Lane, and was completely destroyed during a bombing raid in 1941.

Documents held by the Liverpool Records Office show the problems that the priests had in getting repairs to St Peter’s Church, school and the Presbytery completed following the war damage. There are correspondence with various builders and the War Damage Commission. These include correspondence showing differences of opinion between the Parish Priest, Fr Dawson, OSB, and some of those undertaking work which led (on one occasion in January 1945) to Fr Dawson throwing some men off site. Whether Fr Dawson was justified in his actions is not clear, but in a letter written to Fr Dawson on 28 January 1945 Fr Dawson is told that "My plaster left on Saturday, and refuses to return to the job. He wants his cards if I send him back." In the case of the school roof repairs, leaks were evident in the school roof apparently due to faulty repairs. A letter written to Fr Dawson on 4 February 1945 states that "the fault is due not so much to faulty slates as to the fact that the roof timbers were not set and aligned previous to slating…the roll and drip gutter between the schools and church building should definitely have been renewed….the ridge lead still shows shrapnel holes.…to put the roof right by stripping, resetting and reslating would ….be a bigger job than the original one."

During the 8 nights of the 1941 Liverpool Blitz beginning on 1 May 1941, almost 1,750 people in Liverpool were killed, ~90,000 houses were destroyed, and ~ 75,000 people made homeless. Many areas close to St Peter's were destroyed, specifically the area around Paradise Street.

== Background ==
The following is an extract from the Press Account on the Centenary of St Peter's in 1888, and explains some of the history of Catholic churches in Liverpool leading up to the founding of St Peter's:

"In 1701, Father Gillibrand, S. J., Chaplain of the Squire of Crosby, established the first religious services held in the city for Catholics for upwards of a century. In 1707, he came to reside permanently in Liverpool. In 1736, Father Hardisty, S. J., built the first Catholic Chapel, in Edmund Street. It was demolished by a mob in 1746. While a new chapel was being built, under the guise of a warehouse, by a wealthy merchant, named Pippard, the Catholics met stealthily for worship in the house of a Mr. and Mrs. Green in Dale Street, and the only friends of the proscribed ones were two large-hearted and tolerant Presbyterians who lived in adjoining houses, and who helped the Papists to gain, without observation, access to their temporary place of meeting. The Mission was and is still called St. Mary's.

In 1783, it passed out of the hands of the Jesuits into those of another learned Order, that of St. Benedict. In 1758, the chapel in Edmund Street had been destroyed during a riot, and a new building took its place in Lumber Street, of which no trace remains, its place now being held in Highfield Street by the fine Church planned by Augustus Welby Pugin, when that great designer's influence was beginning to be felt in the revival of Gothic architecture. Father Archibald MacDonald, O.S.B., was the first Benedictine attached to St. Mary's, in 1783, and it was he, who in 1788, founded St. Peter's. One hundred years ago, the site of St. Peter's, now pressed by closely clustered dwellings, factories and warehouses, had a rural environment. The choice of the spot on which to build the new church incurred for the zealous monk the mild displeasure of his superiors, who suggested it was too far out of town. Still, there St. Peter's was built, and there it still stands to-day.

Prominent on the church are white marble memorials of departed Priests, who have ministered there.

On the Founder's monument we read: "In the vaults of this chapel are deposited the remains of the Rev. Archibald MacDonald, who departed this life on the 29 July 1814, aged 78 years. The founder of this chapel, and for a period of 26 years its liberal, intelligent and revered pastor, to whose memory the Catholicks of Liverpool erect this monument.—R.I.P."

The other monuments are those of Father William Tarleton, O.S.B., who died in 1816 of typhus fever, caught while consoling the sick; Dr. James Appleton, O.S.B., D.D., who died a martyr of charity, in 1847; Father John Robinson, O.S.B, who died, deeply mourned by his flock, in 1837, and Father Vincent Glover, O.S.B, who died in 1840, aged 49.

== Anecdote ==
There is a story retold concerning Fr Basil Primavesi who was Parish Priest at St Peter's from 1929 until his death in 1937. One night during his tenure:

"The church was even threatened with destruction by a great fire which seemed likely to cross Back Seel Street. Fr Basil, roused from sleep, went down, placed a medal of St. Benedict on the church wall and returned to bed. A change of wind followed and materially aided the task of the fire-engines which had arrived."

== Historical note ==
Church Street in Liverpool takes its name from the former St Peter's Church (now demolished) which was "the first church built in Lancashire after the Reformation". Students of history should not confuse this church with St Peter's R.C. Church in Seel Street.

== 21st Century ==
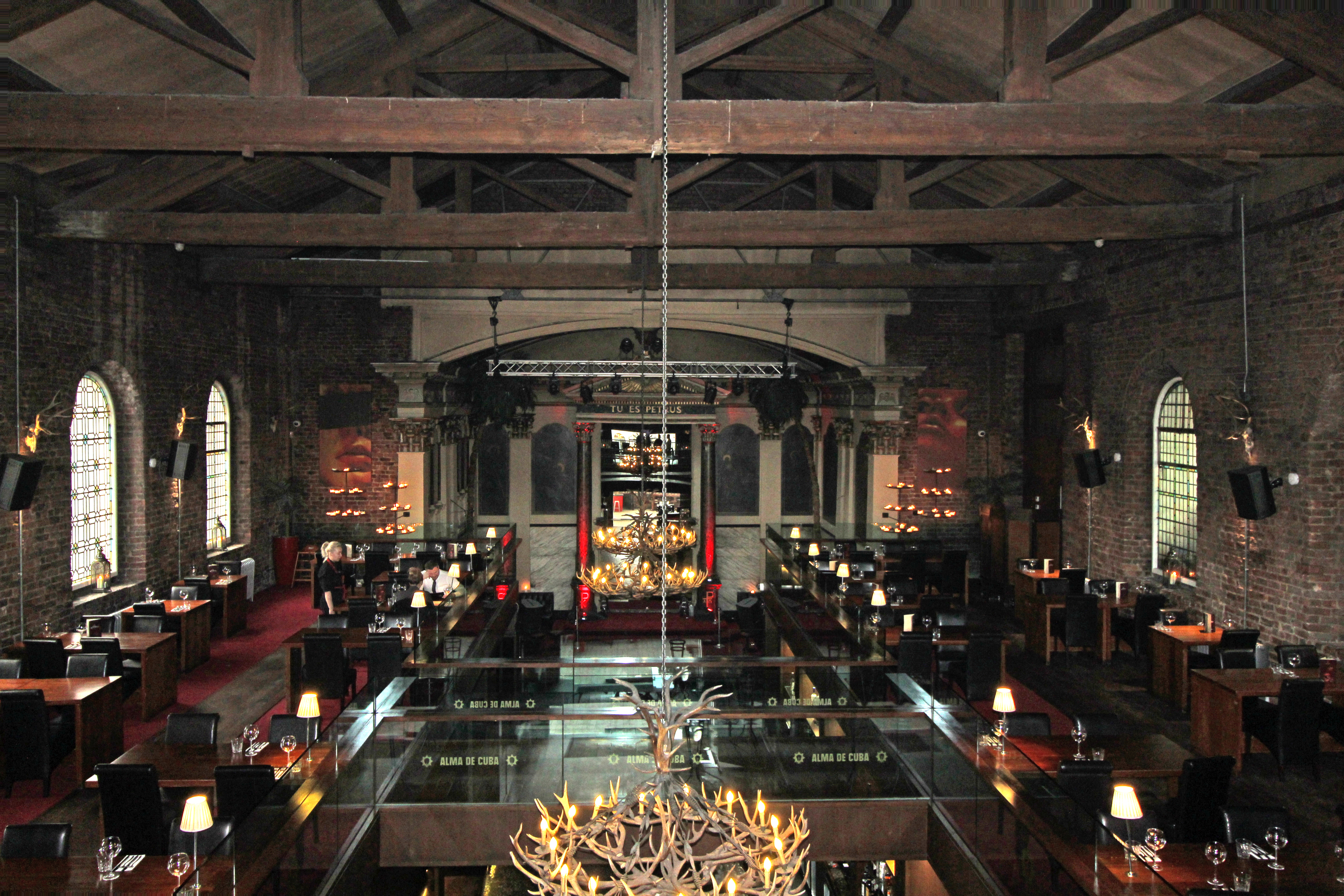
Restaurant area on the first floor of Alma de Cuba before the purchase of the site by Signature Living (and the installation of "The Vestry" Mezzanine Floor in December 2018), and before the subsequent refurbishment of the site in September-November 2024 by the 1936 Pub Company (who removed "The Vestry" floor) and its subsequent reopening as St Peter's Tavern.

St. Peter's Church became a restaurant and bar named Alma de Cuba (Spanish: "Soul of Cuba") in September 2005.

In 2024, it reopened as St Peter's Tavern.

== Art and artefacts within St Peter's Church and the Alma de Cuba ==
When St Peter's Church was converted into the Alma de Cuba, much of the interior was left as it was because of it being a Grade II Listed Building. Under the rules, if the removal of artefacts threatened damage to the integrity of the building it was forbidden. Thus much of the interior of St Peter's Church remains, as do the memorial tablets and (most significantly) the murals which were painted alongside the large picture of St Peter behind the altar.

Behind the altar in St Peter's there used to be a large picture of St Peter. This was removed from the church and is now stored at the Liverpool Metropolitan Cathedral of Christ the King. The area where the picture was located has been replaced by a large mirror in the Alma de Cuba.

The statue of St Peter which was in the church, seated (in marble and bronze) is now displayed in the Crypt Chapel at the Metropolitan Cathedral of Christ the King. This statue is a small copy of the much larger original in St Peter's in Rome.

The free standing statue of St Benedict (which was in the church) is now located with the Benedictines at St Begh's Priory in Whitehaven, Cumbria, whilst the large pieta is now installed at St Mary's Church in Chorley.

A photographic record of the interior of St Peter's during its conversion was made by Joe McLoughlin on 8 January 2004.

As mentioned above, St Peter's was dominated by a large picture of St Peter. Photographic evidence shows that the words on the pediment above the picture have changed at least three times in the last century. In 1920 the booklet produced for the Grand Bazaar shows a photograph of the church with the wording on the pediment as "I am the Good Shepherd". A newspaper cutting from the Catholic Times from 4 March 1932 shows a sketch of the Sanctuary with the words "CHRIST THE KING" appearing on the pediment, and these words were certainly still in place for the 150th Anniversary in 1938 (as is evidenced by the photos taken by Fr D’Andria at the time). These specific words remain until at least the 1960s, and possibly beyond. Exactly when the wording changed to "TU ES PETRUS" (You are Peter) is not clear. The words "TU ES PETRUS" still appear on the pediment in the Alma de Cuba today. It is not clear if the words have changed more than the three times referenced, and evidence for further changes is being sought.

== The puzzles of the Church Extensions ==
There appears to be no clear account of when the main extension to the church (listed as 1845 above) actually took place. This is remarkable as it is such a notable change in the Parish history. The situation is neatly summed in "A Century and a Half - Notes on St. Peter's (Seel Street) 1788-1938" by an author who clearly has access to the Parish Records:

"Even the year (of the extension) has been variously stated. Allanson says 1845." (Fr Allanson wrote volumes on the English Benedictine History, and these were made available to the author by the then Abbot of Ampleforth). "The Centenary Commemoration says 1843. A note made about 1850 in a private account book mentions 1845. The Seel Street Guide (1868) gives 1846. However, the Church Notices book seemed decisive. On the last Sunday of Pentecost, 1845, the following was read: 'After to-day there will be no Mass either on Sundays or week-days in this chapel until the Sunday before Christmas when it will be again reopened for Divine Service...The Vestry will be opened every Sunday afternoon at 3 o'clock as usual for baptisms.' The next notices are dated 4th Sunday of Advent, 1845. So between November 23 and December 21 is the time of the building of the new sanctuary."

The "Official Handbook" of the Grand Bazaar (1920) makes no note of an extension around 1845, though this could just be an omission.

The "Official Handbook" of the Grand Bazaar also mentions an apparently earlier extension: "1817 - Opening of New extension of St Peter's, previously a part of Presbytery. Sermon preached by Father Baines, O.S.B., of Bath, regarded as principal pulpit orator of his day (Burke, p. 35)." In "A Century and a half..." the author states that Fr Robinson, O.S.B.'s, tenure (which began in 1816) saw many changes to the parish. "In his second year" therefore 1818 " the church was 'enlarged' according to several brief notices, but judging by the picture of 1810, this can only mean the addition of the porch and of the gallery. However, the alteration was important enough to cause a solemn reopening on November 27, 1812...". The date here of 1812 makes no sense, so is likely to be a typo for 1818. The author of "A Century and a half..." is unaware of any part of the Presbytery being used for the 1818 extension, though the authors of the Bazaar Handbook may have simply have made an error. It is also worth noting that the author of "A Century and a half..." again quotes Allanson's volumes regarding the extension around 1818 which state that "gallery enlarged and organ built over the altar."

It would appear then that there are at least two extensions to the church, one ~ 1818, and a later more significant one ~ 1845. However, the lack of clarity in the documents available and those referenced by the authors is a puzzle.

== See also ==
- Grade II listed buildings in Liverpool-L1

== Sources ==
- The Official Handbook of the Grand Bazaar (held 14–16 October 1920);
- A Century and a Half - Notes on St. Peter's (Seel Street) 1788-1938. Although no author is listed for this publication it appears to have been printed in 1938 by O.H. Bateman & Co. Ltd, and to have been written by Fr Louis Joseph D'Andria, O.S.B. D'Andria himself referred to this booklet as "The Century".
- Coping With The Blitz - St Peter's, Seel Street, Liverpool 1940-41. Letters from Louis Joseph D'Andria O.S.B. to Kevin Herbert Byrne O.S.B., Abbot of Ampleforth, Published by North West Catholic History Society, 2000, and edited by John Davies. ISBN 0953102076.
