= Great George Street Congregational Church =

Coordinates: 53.3993°N 2.9768°W

- The Black-E
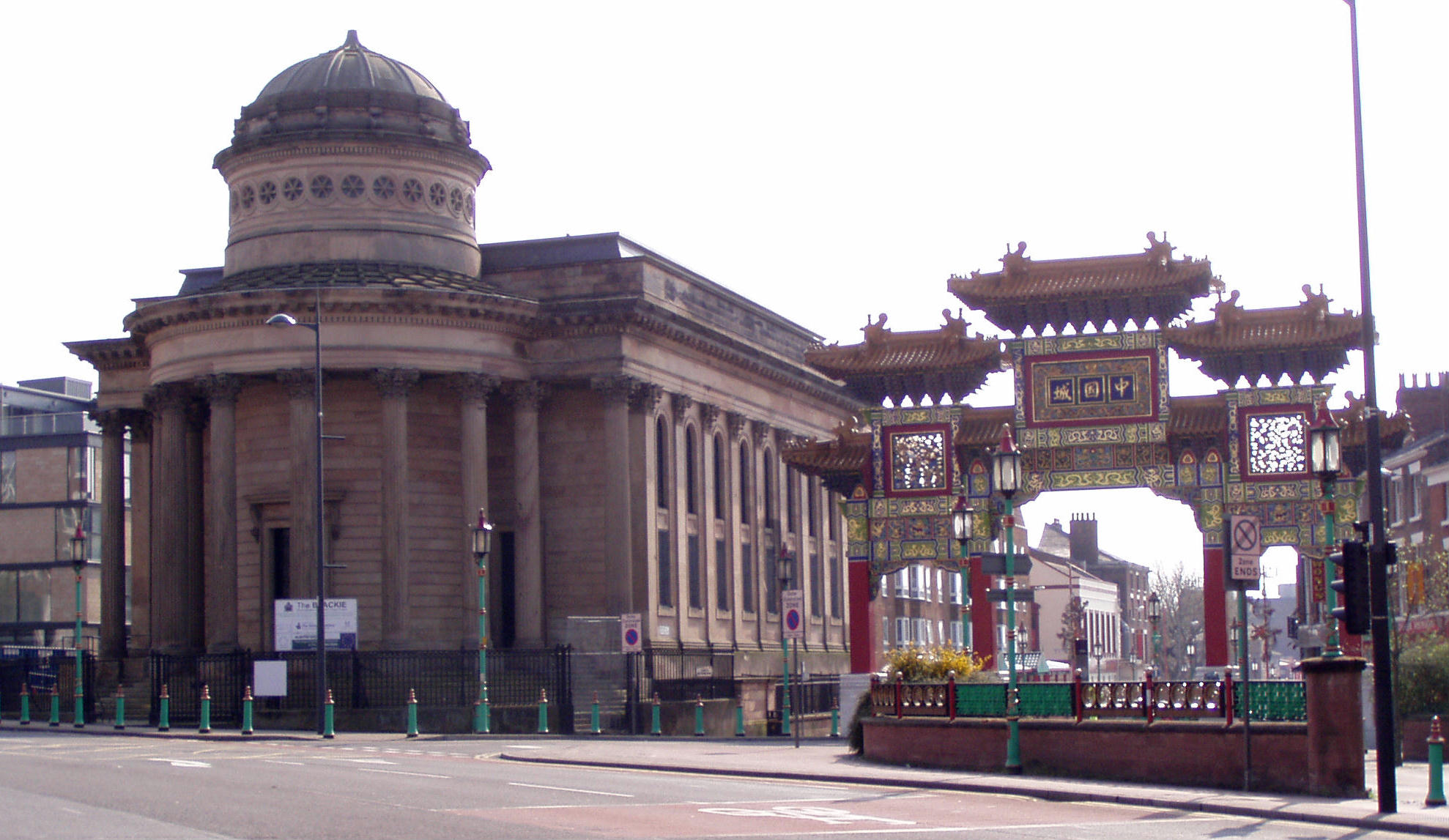
- The Black-E and the Chinese Arch

- Location in Liverpool
- OS grid reference: SJ 352,896
- Location: Great George Street, Liverpool, Merseyside
- Country: England
- Denomination: Congregational
- Website: The Black-E

Architecture
- Heritage designation: Grade II
- Designated: 28 June 1952
- Architect: Joseph Franklin
- Architectural type: Church
- Style: Neoclassical
- Groundbreaking: 1840
- Completed: 1841
- Closed: 1967

Specifications
- Materials: Stone

Great George Street Congregational Church is on the corner of Great George Street and Nelson Street, Liverpool, Merseyside, England. It is no longer in use as a Congregational church, and has been converted into a community arts centre. Formerly nicknamed The Blackie, it has since been officially named The Black-E. The former church is recorded in the National Heritage List for England as a designated Grade II listed building.

== History ==
The first chapel on the site was built in 1811. The foundation stone was laid in April 1811, and the chapel was opened for worship on 27 May 1812. It cost about £13,000 (equivalent to £910,000 in 2025), and provided seating for nearly 2,000 people. The chapel was destroyed by fire on 19 February 1840. Plans for a new church were drawn up and provided free by Joseph Franklin, the city architect. The foundation stone for the new church was laid on 7 July 1840, and it opened on 21 October 1841. Its cost was £13,992, and again it seated almost 2,000 people. Worship continued in the church until the last service, which was held in February 1967. The building was acquired later that year by the Peter Moores Foundation. Work then began to convert it into the first community arts project in the United Kingdom, combining a contemporary arts centre with a community centre. In 1975 the interior was remodelled by Kingham Knight Associates, removing all the fittings, and dividing it into two floors. By the 1960s the exterior of the church had become darkened by atmospheric pollution, and was nicknamed "The Blackie". Although the exterior was cleaned in the 1980s, it retained this name until it was formally changed to "The Black-E".

== Architecture ==
The building is constructed in stone, and is in two storeys with a basement. There are nine bays along the sides. At the junction of the two streets is a semicircular portico, with fluted monolithic Corinthian columns carrying a recessed circular tower. Around the tower is a band of small circular windows, and on the top is a shallow dome. Along the sides of the church are Corinthian unfluted pilasters, between which are two tiers of windows; the windows in the upper storeys have round heads, and those below have square heads. The only remaining internal feature from the original design is the double staircase with iron balusters under the dome. The interior of the dome is coffered. Outside the building are ornamental iron railings.

== See also ==
- Grade II listed buildings in Liverpool-L1
