= North Western Hotel, Liverpool =

Building in Liverpool, England

North Western Hotel
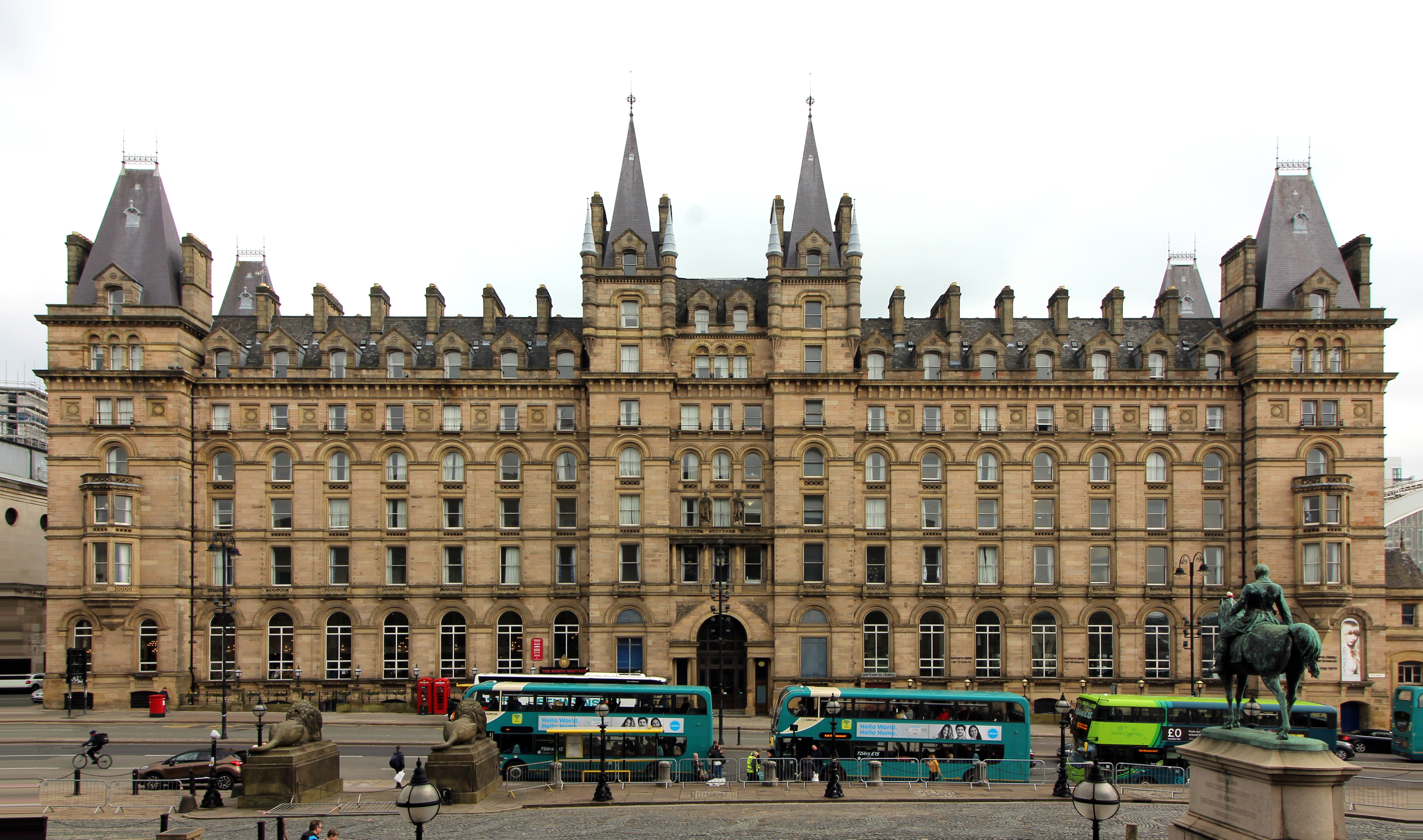
- North Western Hotel

- Location in Merseyside
- 53.40827°N 2.97881°W
- OS grid reference: SJ 350 906

History
- Built: 1871
- Built for: London and North Western Railway

Site notes
- Architect: Alfred Waterhouse
- Architectural style: French Renaissance
- Governing body: John Moores University

Listed Building – Grade II
- Designated: 28 June 1952
- Reference no.: 1084209

The former North Western Hotel is a historic building in Liverpool, England. It is located on the east side of Lime Street, fronting Lime Street railway station. Opened in 1871, it more recently served as office space and student accommodation. It was restored from 2018 to 2022; the upper floors are currently a Radisson RED Hotel, while the ground floor houses a pub and a restaurant. The building is recorded in the National Heritage List for England as a designated Grade II listed building.

== History ==
Opened as a railway hotel in 1871 by the London and North Western Railway the hotel served Lime Street railway station. The design was by Alfred Waterhouse, containing 330 rooms. The hotel closed in 1933, subsequently becoming Lime Street Chambers for a while before closing once again. In 1994 the building was bought by John Moores University and, at a cost of £6 million, was converted into a hall of residence for students, opening in 1996. In 2000 the ground floor (north end) was opened as the Head of Steam pub, and in 2008 the south end opened as the Barbara Daley Hair & Beauty salon.

It was announced on 28 September 2018 that the upper floors would be restored as a hotel by the Marcus Worthington Group at a cost of £30m. The Radisson RED Liverpool Hotel opened on 13 December 2022. In 2013 the Head of Steam closed and the site re-furbished as The NorthWestern, a Wetherspoons pub; in 2022 Barbara Daley's moved to new premises and the site converted to the Stoke brasserie.

== Architecture ==
The building is constructed in stone with a slate roof in the Renaissance Revival style resembling a French château. The Baroque details are in the Second Empire style, common for this time period. It has five storeys, a basement and an attic, and is in 21 bays. The end bays and the bays flanking the three-bay centre are carried up into towers. The central entrance is round-arched, and is flanked by Doric columns. The entrance hall features granite columns, a period fireplace and a grand staircase.

== See also ==
- Grade II listed buildings in Liverpool-L1
