= Lime Street, Liverpool =

Major thoroughfare in Merseyside

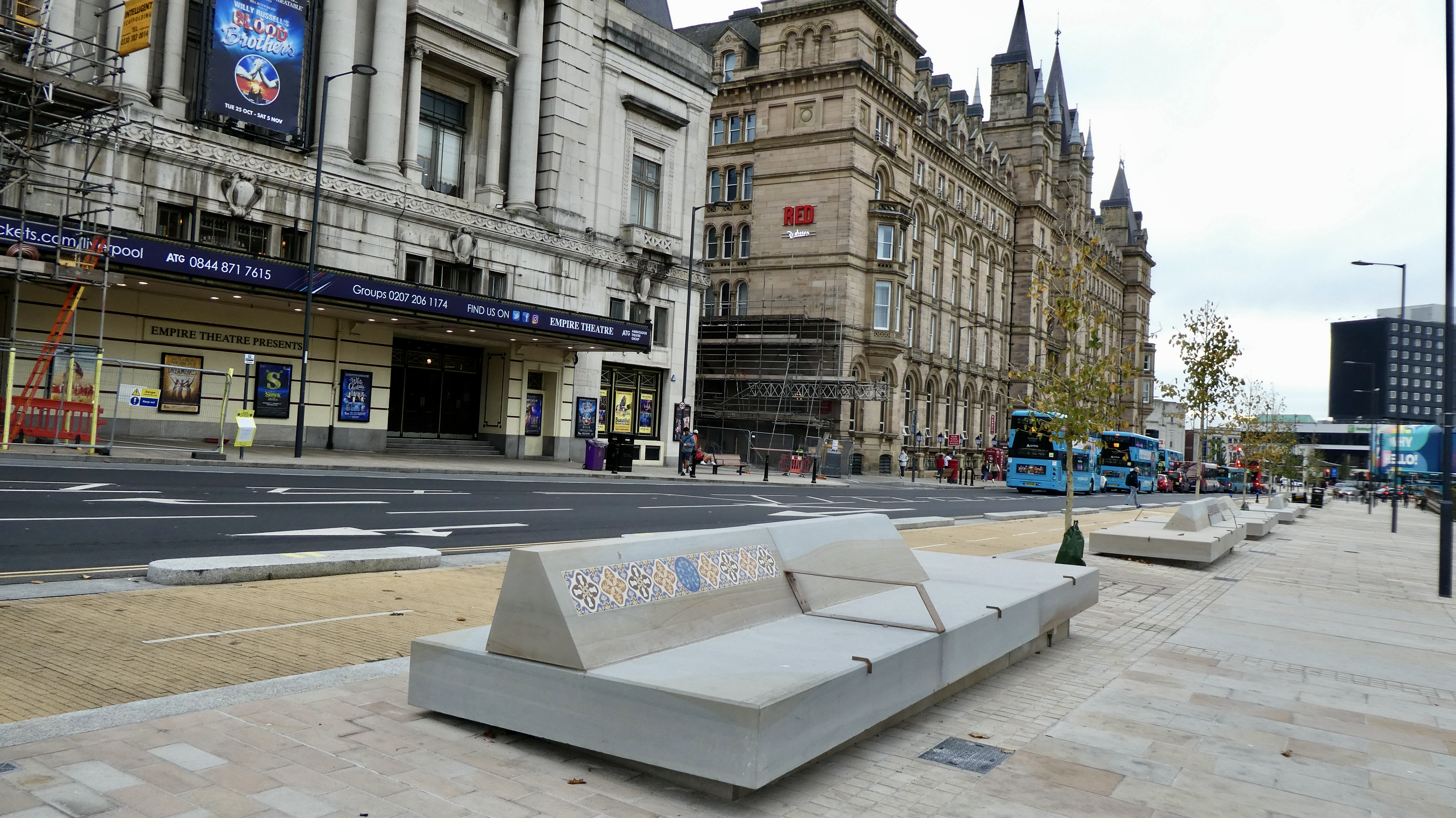
- Lime Street in 2024, looking south from Liverpool Empire Theatre towards St Johns Shopping Centre

- Location within Liverpool
- Location: Liverpool city centre
- Postal code: L1
- Coordinates: 53.408°N 2.979°W

Other
- Known for: Empire Theatre, St George's Hall, Liverpool Lime Street

Lime Street in Liverpool, England, was created as a street in 1790. Its most famous feature is Lime Street railway station. It is part of the William Brown Street conservation area.

== History ==
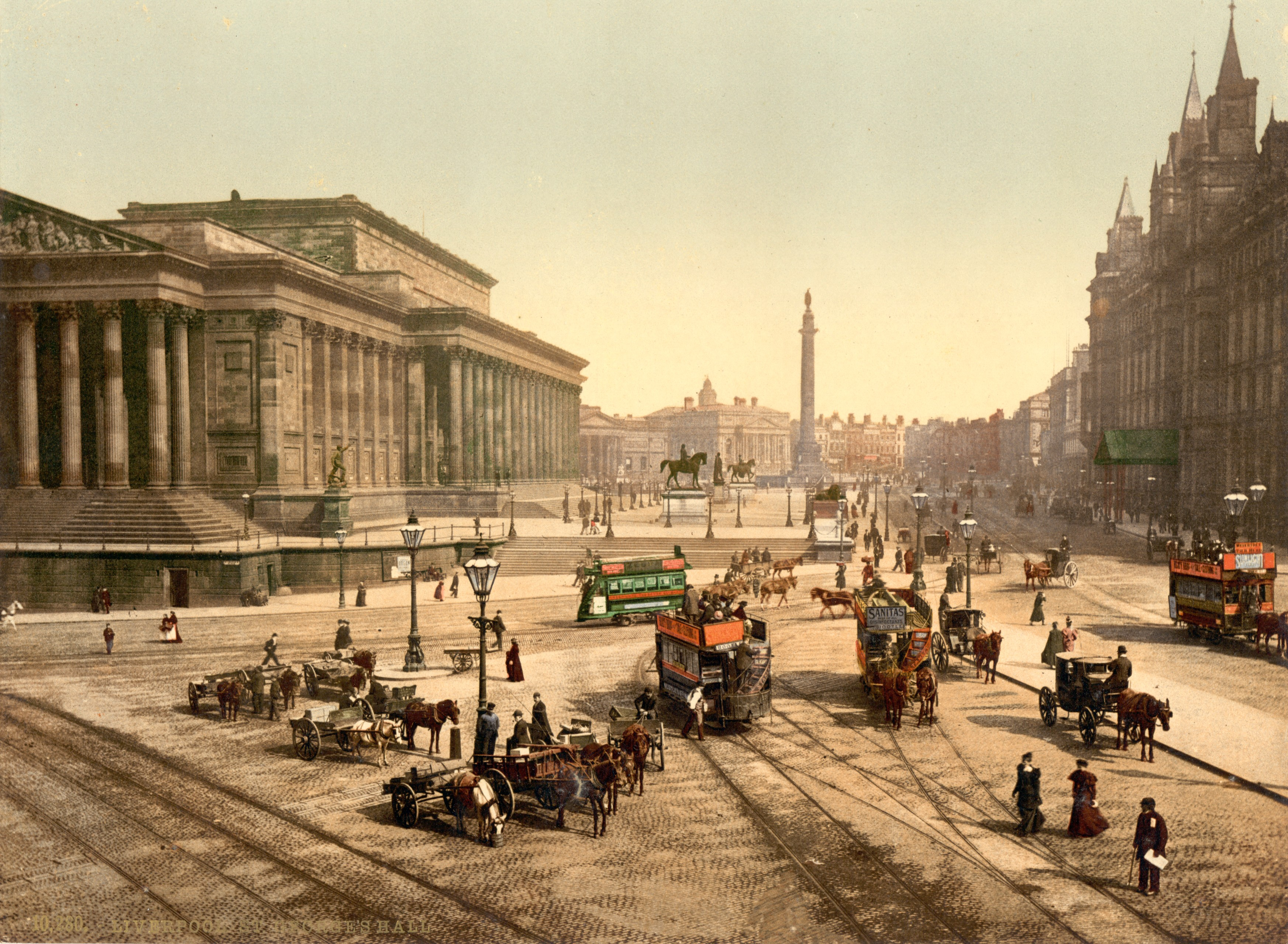
Lime Street in the 1890s, with St. George's Hall on the left and the Great North Western Hotel on the right. Wellington's column is visible in the distance

The street was named after lime kilns owned by William Harvey, a local businessman. The lime kilns were situated close to Lord Nelson Street. Before the street was laid out, the land was home to four windmills in the 1770s. The street was first known as 'Limekiln Lane' before taking its current name. When the street was laid out in 1790 it was outside the city limits, but by 1804 the lime kilns were causing problems at a nearby infirmary (situated where St Georges Hall now sits). The doctors complained about the smell, and so the kilns were moved away, but the street name remained unchanged. During the 1800s, the street was the site of several roperies.

With the arrival of the railway line in 1836, the street moved from a marginal to a central location in the city, a position that confirmed by the creation of St George's Hall, on the side of the street opposite the railway station, in 1854. Wellington's Column, a monument to the Duke of Wellington was built to mark one end of the street, at the corner with William Brown Street. In 1871 the North Western Hotel opened and is now operated by Radisson.

The modern street is part of the A5038 road. The Lime Street name ends at the crossroads marked by the Adelphi Hotel, though, as Renshaw Street, the road continues directly uphill to St Luke's Church.

The Futurist Cinema operated on Lime Street from 1912, until the cinema's closure in 1982. The building was demolished in 2016.

The Empire Theatre opened on Lime Street in 1925, and was the second theatre to be built on the site. The first theatre had opened in 1866, and was demolished in 1924. The theatre has the largest two-tier auditorium in Britain.

In 1970, the Churchill Way Flyovers were opened, linking Lime Street to Dale Street and Tithebarn Street. Built as part of an inner-city ring road project that was never fully completed, the flyovers were demolished in 2019 having been deemed unsafe.

== Reference to the street ==
The street is mentioned as the favourite haunt of prostitute "Maggie May" in the Liverpool folk song of that name, most famously recorded by the Beatles on the album Let It Be.

The name has been used in many novels and plays, including Alun Owen's No Trams to Lime Street and Helen Forrester's autobiographical Lime Street at Two.

In 2012, the farce A Nightmare on Lime Street was performed at the Royal Court Theatre, Liverpool, starring David Gest as Frankenstein's monster, being recreated in the bowels of Lime Street railway station.

The 2015 song Lime St. by Welsh rock bank Neck Deep references Lime Street in Liverpool.

== Gallery ==
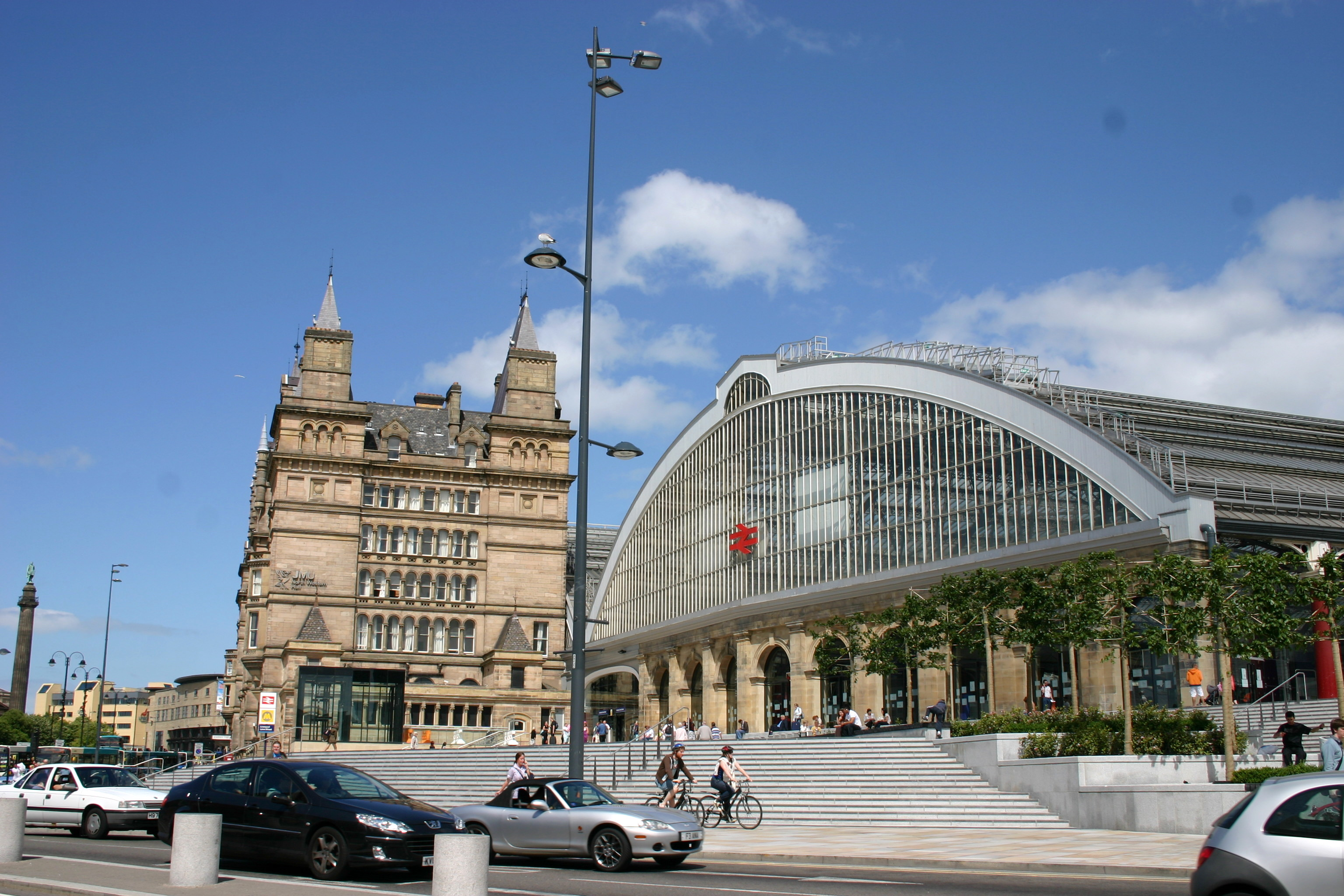
Lime Street railway station in 2010

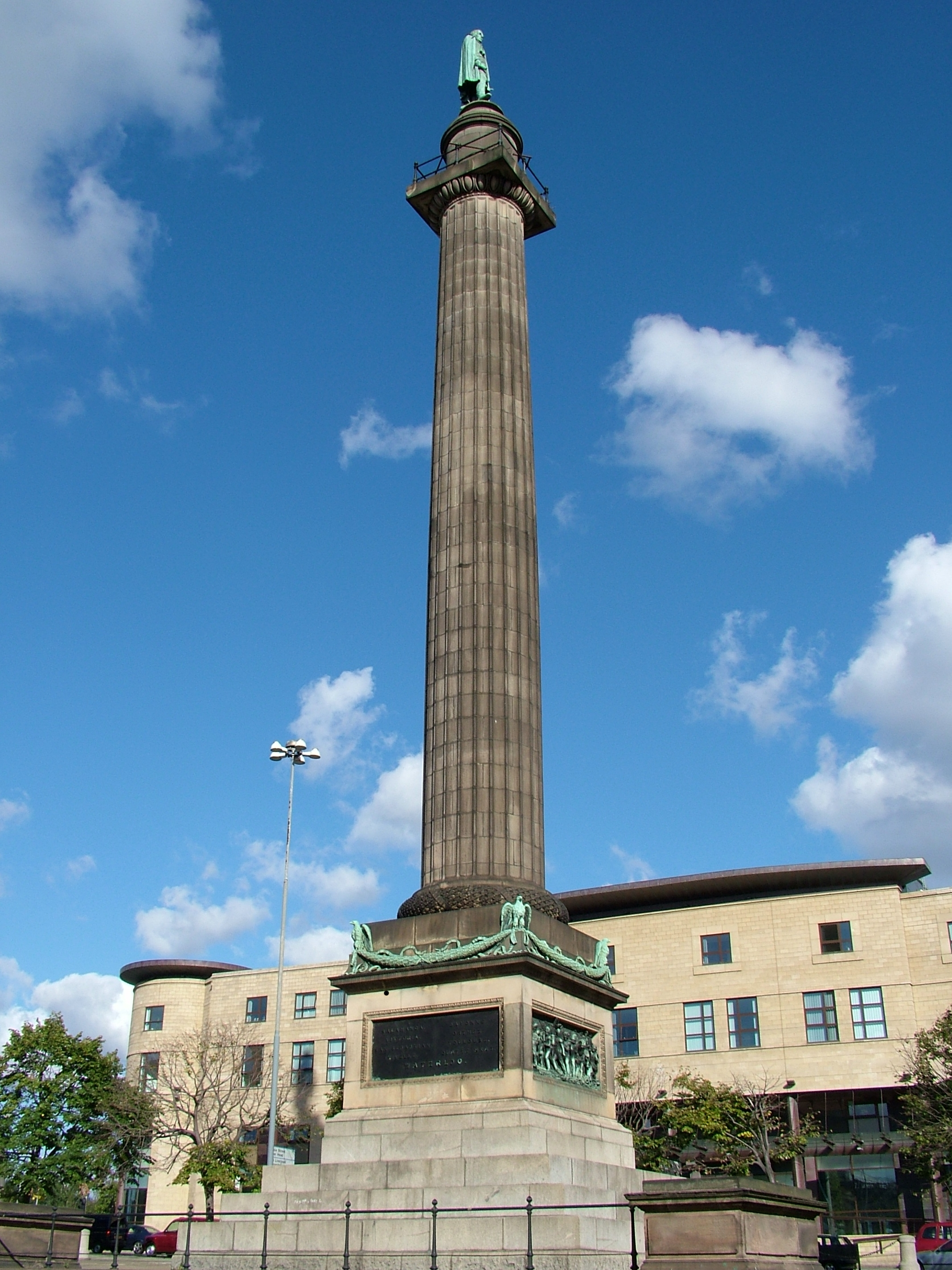
Wellington's column, marking the end of the street.

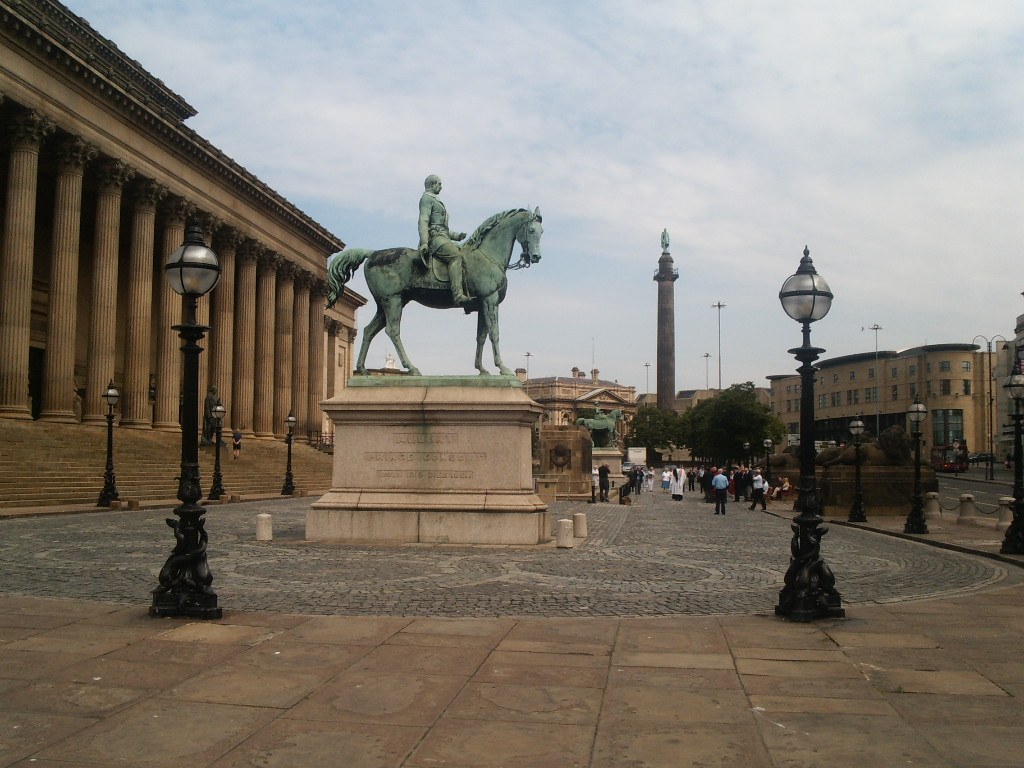
Equestrian statue of Prince Albert, by Thomas Thornycroft

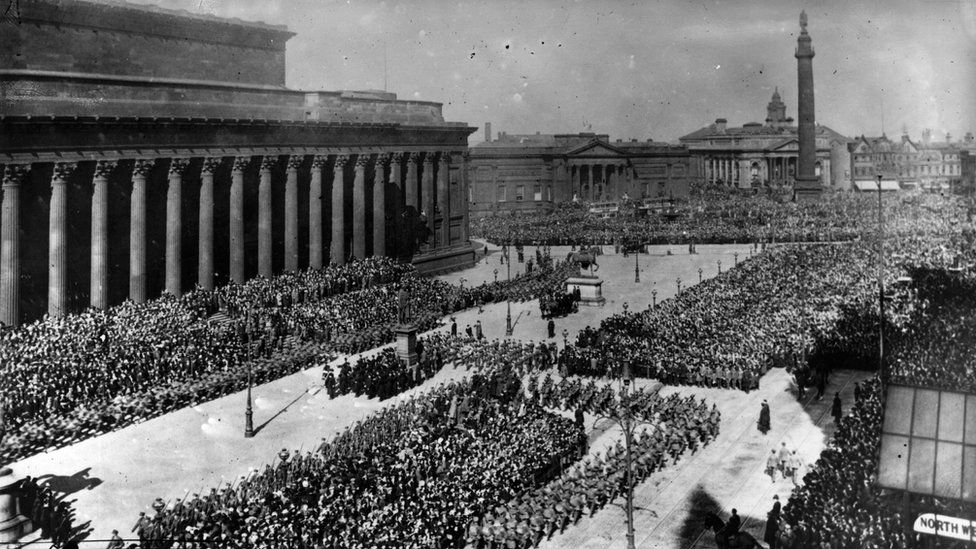
Inspection of the Liverpool Pals regiment on Lime Street by Lord Kitchener in 1915

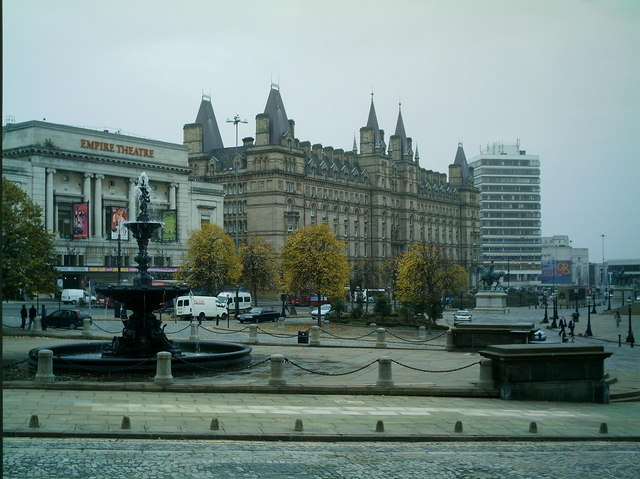
Lime Street viewed from William Brown Street
