= Liverpool Resurgent =

Artwork by Jacob Epstein

Coordinates: 53°24′19″N 2°58′42″W

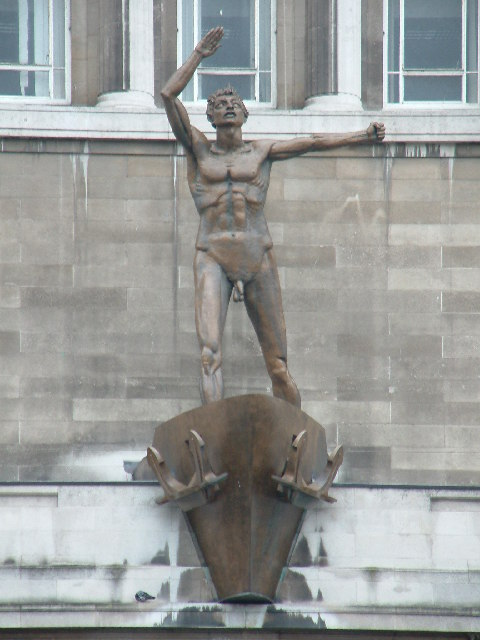
Liverpool Resurgent (1956) by Jacob Epstein

Liverpool Resurgent is an artwork by Jacob Epstein, mounted above the main entrance to the former Lewis's department store building in Ranelagh Street, Liverpool. It comprises a large bronze statue and three relief panels.

The current Lewis's Building was constructed for Lewis's in 1947 by Fraser, Sons and Geary to designs by Gerald de Courcy Fraser: he had also designed the previous 1920s Lewis's store that had been destroyed by bombing in the Second World War.

The main 18-foot-high (5.5 m) bronze statue stands on the portico above the entrance. It depicts a naked man standing on a plinth shaped like the prow of a ship projecting from the façade of the building, with left arm stretched out and right arm raised as if calling or signalling. It symbolises Liverpool's resurgence following the war, but it is nicknamed locally as either "Nobby Lewis" or "Dickie Lewis".

Below the statute is a modern Egyptian-style portico in Portland stone with four giant order square columns rising three floors, framing three entrance doors. Above each door is a ciment fondu relief panel also by Epstein, installed in 1955, representing the new generation who will benefit from the rebuilding: one of children fighting, another of a baby in a pram beside a dog, and the third depicting children playing. The children are modelled on Epstein's children and grandchildren.

The work was unveiled on 20 November 1956 to celebrate the centenary of Lewis's and the completion of its reconstruction works. The statue became known as a meeting place, and was mentioned in the 1962 song "In My Liverpool Home" by Peter McGovern:

We speak with an accent exceedingly rare,
Meet under a statue exceedingly bare

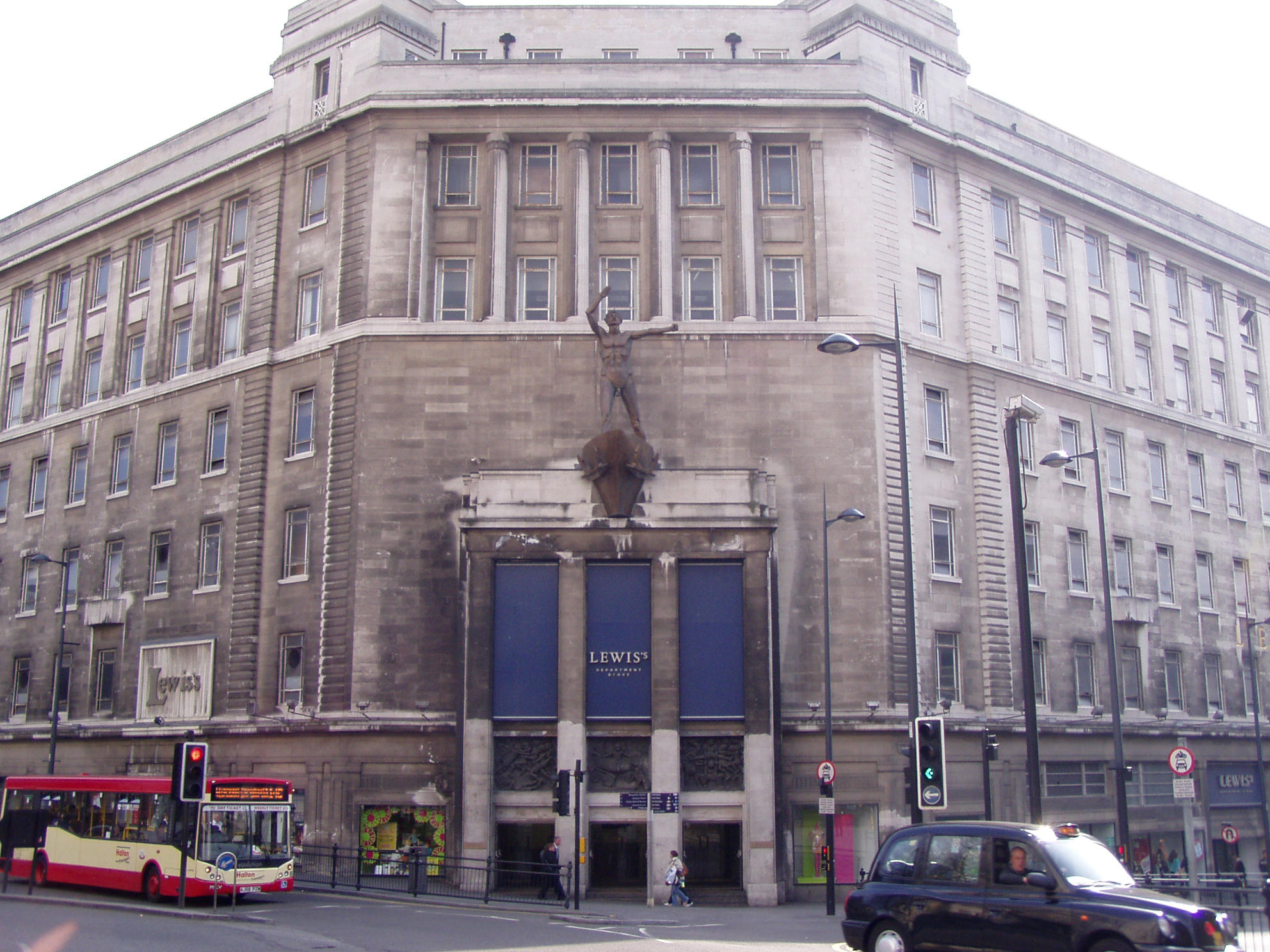

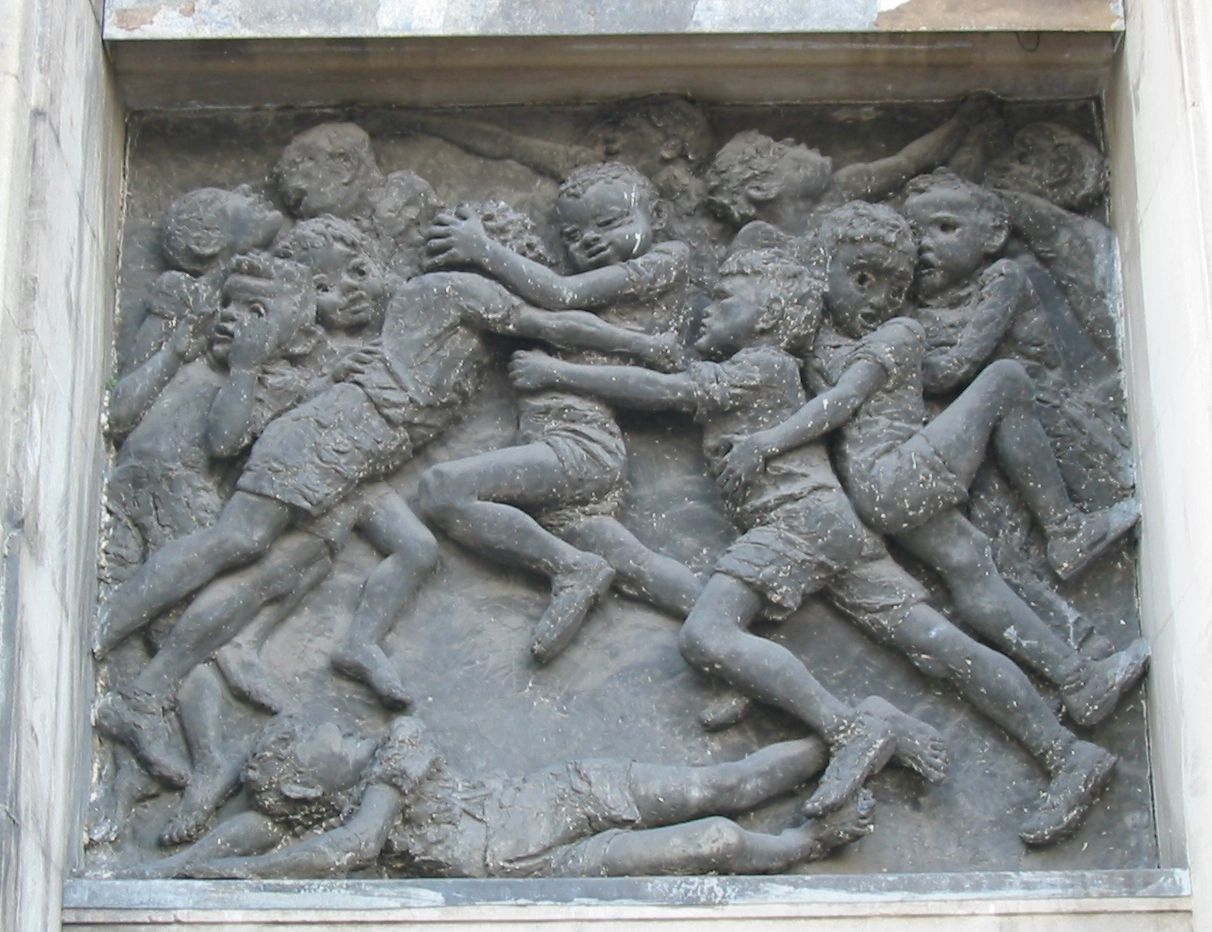

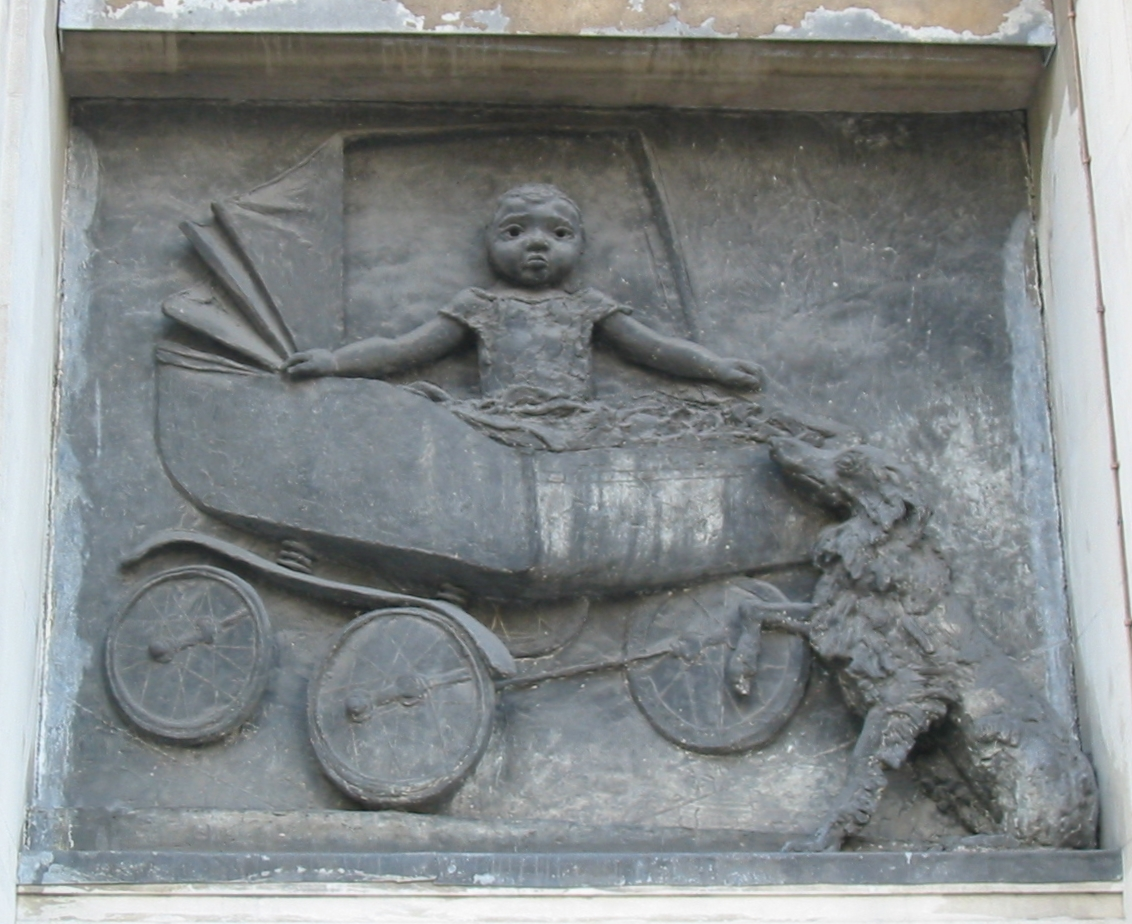

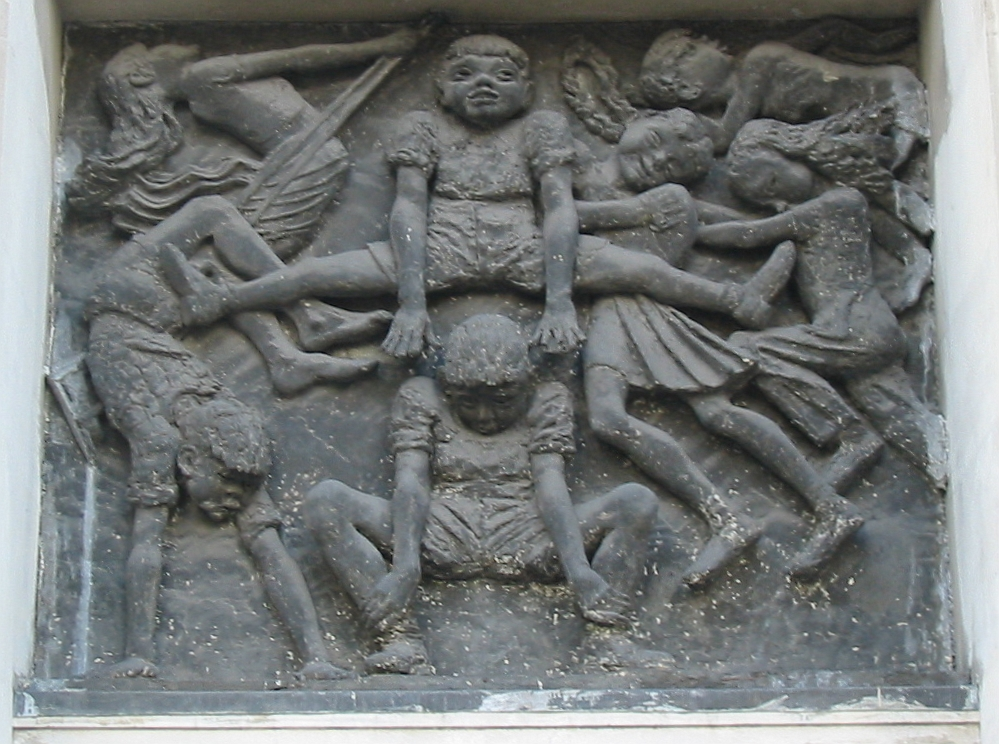

The store closed in 2007 and the building was being redeveloped as Central Village, with retail units, a hotel and gymnasium, though the project was never finished. It is a Grade II listed building.

== See also ==
- List of sculptures by Jacob Epstein
