= List of schools in Cheshire East =

This is a list of schools in Cheshire East, a unitary authority in Cheshire, England.

== State-funded schools ==
=== Primary schools ===
- Acton CE Primary Academy, Acton
- Adlington Primary School, Adlington
- Alderley Edge Community Primary School, Alderley Edge
- Alsager Highfields Community Primary School, Alsager
- Ash Grove Academy, Macclesfield
- Ashdene Primary School, Wilmslow
- Astbury St Mary's CE Primary School, Astbury
- Beechwood Primary School and Nursery, Crewe
- The Berkeley Academy, Wistaston
- Bexton Primary School, Knutsford
- Bickerton Holy Trinity CE Primary School, Bickerton
- Black Firs Primary School, Congleton
- Bollinbrook CE Primary School, Macclesfield
- Bollington Cross CE Primary School, Bollington
- Bollington St John's CE Primary School, Bollington
- Bosley St Mary's CE Primary School, Bosley
- Brereton CE Primary School, Brereton Green
- Bridgemere CE Primary School, Bridgemere
- Brierley Primary School, Crewe
- Broken Cross Primary Academy and Nursery, Macclesfield
- Buglawton Primary School, Congleton
- Bunbury Aldersey School, Bunbury
- Calveley Primary Academy, Calveley
- Chelford CE Primary School, Chelford
- Christ the King RC and CE Primary School, Macclesfield
- Cledford Primary School, Middlewich
- Cranberry Academy, Alsager
- Daven Primary School, Congleton
- Dean Valley Community Primary School, Bollington
- The Dingle Primary School, Haslington
- Disley Primary School, Disley
- Edleston Primary School, Crewe
- Egerton Primary School, Knutsford
- Elworth CE Primary School, Elworth
- Elworth Hall Primary School, Elworth
- Excalibur Primary School, Alsager
- Gainsborough Primary and Nursery School, Crewe
- Gawsworth Primary School, Gawsworth
- Goostrey Community Primary School, Goostrey
- Gorsey Bank Primary School, Wilmslow
- Handforth Grange Primary School, Handforth
- Haslington Primary Academy, Haslington
- Havannah Primary School, Congleton
- Hermitage Primary School, Holmes Chapel
- High Legh Primary School, High Legh
- Highfields Academy, Nantwich
- Hollinhey Primary School, Sutton Lane Ends
- Holmes Chapel Primary School, Holmes Chapel
- Hungerford Primary Academy, Crewe
- Hurdsfield Community Primary School, Macclesfield
- Ivy Bank Primary School, Macclesfield
- Kettleshulme St James' CE Primary School, Kettleshulme
- Lacey Green Primary Academy, Wilmslow
- Leighton Academy, Crewe
- Lindow Community Primary School, Wilmslow
- Little Bollington CE Primary School, Little Bollington
- Lostock Hall Primary School, Poynton
- Lower Park School, Poynton
- Mablins Lane Community Primary School, Crewe
- Manor Park Primary School, Knutsford
- Marlborough Primary School, Tytherington
- Marlfields Primary Academy, Congleton
- Marton & District CE Primary School, Marton
- Middlewich Primary School, Middlewich
- Millfields Primary School and Nursery, Nantwich
- Mobberley CE Primary School, Mobberley
- Monks Coppenhall Academy, Crewe
- Mossley CE Primary School, Congleton
- Mottram St Andrew Primary Academy, Mottram St Andrew
- Nantwich Primary Academy, Nantwich
- Nether Alderley Primary School, Nether Alderley
- Offley Primary Academy, Sandbach
- Parkroyal Community School, Macclesfield
- Pear Tree Primary School, Stapeley
- Pebble Brook Primary School, Crewe
- Peover Superior Endowed Primary School, Knutsford
- Pikemere School, Alsager
- Pott Shrigley Church School, Pott Shrigley
- Prestbury CE Primary School, Prestbury
- Puss Bank School and Nursery, Macclesfield
- The Quinta Primary School, Congleton
- Rainow Primary School, Rainow
- Rode Heath Primary School, Rode Heath
- Ruston CoFE first School, Macclesfield
- St Alban's RC Primary School, Macclesfield
- St Anne's RC Primary School, Nantwich
- St Anne's Fulshaw CE Primary School, Wilmslow
- St Benedict's RC Primary School, Handforth
- St Gabriel's RC Primary School, Alsager
- St James' CE Primary School, Audlem
- St John the Evangelist CE Primary School, Macclesfield
- St John's CE Primary School, Sandbach Heath
- St Mary's RC Primary School, Congleton
- St Mary's RC Primary School, Crewe
- St Mary's RC Primary School, Middlewich
- St Michael's Community Academy, Crewe
- St Oswald's Worleston CE Primary School, Aston juxta Mondrum
- St Paul's RC Primary School, Poynton
- St Vincent's Catholic Primary School, Knutsford
- Sandbach Primary Academy, Sandbach
- Scholar Green Primary School, Scholar Green
- Shavington Primary School, Shavington
- Smallwood CE Primary School, Sandbach
- Sound and District Primary School, Sound
- Stapeley Broad Lane CE Primary School, Stapeley
- Styal Primary School, Styal
- Underwood West Academy, Crewe
- Upton Priory School, Macclesfield
- Vernon Primary School, Poynton
- Vine Tree Primary School, Crewe
- Warmingham CE Primary School, Warmingham
- Weaver Primary School, Nantwich
- Weston Village Primary School, Weston
- Wheelock Primary School, Sandbach
- Whirley Primary School, Macclesfield
- Willaston Primary Academy, Willaston
- The Wilmslow Academy, Wilmslow
- Wincle CE Primary School, Wincle
- Wistaston Academy, Wistaston
- Wistaston Church Lane Academy, Wistaston
- Woodcock's Well CE Primary School, Mow Cop
- Worth Primary School, Poynton
- Wrenbury Primary School, Wrenbury
- Wybunbury Delves CE Primary School, Wybunbury

=== Secondary schools ===
- All Hallows' Catholic College, Macclesfield
- Alsager School, Alsager
- Brine Leas School, Nantwich
- Cheshire Studio School, Knutsford
- Congleton High School, Congleton
- Crewe Engineering and Design UTC, Crewe
- Eaton Bank Academy, Congleton
- The Fallibroome Academy, Macclesfield
- Holmes Chapel Comprehensive School, Holmes Chapel
- Knutsford Academy, Knutsford
- The Macclesfield Academy, Macclesfield
- Malbank School and Sixth Form College, Nantwich
- Middlewich High School, Middlewich
- The Oaks Academy, Crewe
- Poynton High School, Poynton
- Ruskin Community High School, Crewe
- St Thomas More Catholic High School, Crewe
- Sandbach High School and Sixth Form College, Sandbach
- Sandbach School, Sandbach
- Shavington Academy, Crewe
- Sir William Stanier School, Crewe
- Tytherington School, Tytherington
- Wilmslow High School, Wilmslow

=== Special and alternative schools ===
- Adelaide Heath Academy, Knutsford
- Adelaide School, Crewe
- The Axis Academy, Crewe
- The Fermain Academy, Macclesfield
- Church Lawton School, Church Lawton
- Oakfield Lodge School, Crewe
- Park Lane School, Macclesfield
- Springfield School, Crewe

=== Further education ===
- Reaseheath College, Nantwich
- Cheshire College – South & West, Crewe

== Independent schools ==
=== Primary and preparatory schools ===
- Pownall Hall School, Wilmslow
- The Ryleys School, Alderley Edge
- Terra Nova School, Holmes Chapel
- Wilmslow Preparatory School, Wilmslow

=== Senior and all-through schools ===
- Beech Hall School, Tytherington
- King's School, Macclesfield, Prestbury

=== Special and alternative schools ===
- Aidenswood, Congleton
- Aurora Summerfields School, Wilmslow
- Compass Community School Cheshire, Middlewich
- Cornerstone Academy, Crewe
- David Lewis School, Little Warford
- Eden School, Macclesfield
- Esland Daven School, Congleton
- High Peak School, Disley
- Lavender Field School, Crewe
- Norbury Court School, Poynton

=== Further education ===
- David Lewis Centre, Little Warford
