= List of songs about Liverpool =

This is a list of songs referencing or written about the city of Liverpool, England:

- "100 Miles to Liverpool" - Lindisfarne
- "Blow the Man Down" - traditional sea shanty
- "Capaldi’s Cafe" - Deaf School
- "Does This Train Stop on Merseyside?" - Amsterdam
- "Faulkner and Hope" - Deaf School
- "Fearless" - Pink Floyd
- "Ferry Cross the Mersey" - Gerry & the Pacemakers
- "Go to Sea Once More" - traditional sea shanty
- "Going Down to Liverpool" - The Bangles
- "Johnny Todd" - traditional sea shanty
- "I Wish I Was Back In Liverpool" - The Dubliners
- "In My Liverpool Home" - Peter McGovern, The Scaffold, The Spinners
- "In Liverpool" - Ringo Starr
- "In Liverpool" - Suzanne Vega
- "Kardomah Cafe" - The Cherry Boys
- "Leaving of Liverpool" - traditional folk song, performed by The Pogues, The Dubliners
- "Let's Dance to Joy Division" - The Wombats
- "Liverpool" - Cherry Vanilla
- "Liverpool 8" - Ringo Starr
- "Liverpool 8" - Deaf School
- "Liverpool 8" - The Real Thing
- "Liverpool Blues" - The Vipers
- "Liverpool Drive" - Chuck Berry
- "Liverpool Docks" - Smokie
- "Liverpool Girl" - Ian McNabb
- "Liverpool Lullaby" - Judy Collins, Cilla Black
- "Liverpool Lou" - Dominic Behan, The Scaffold
- "Liverpool Rain" - Racoon
- "Liverpool Revisited" - Manic Street Preachers
- "Long Haired Lover from Liverpool" - Jimmy Osmond
- "Maggie May" - traditional song, not to be confused with "Maggie May" by Rod Stewart
- "Mathew Street" - Orchestral Manoeuvres in the Dark
- "Off to Sea" - The Longest Johns
- "On The Boat To Liverpool" - Nathan Carter
- "OHM" - Pardon Us
- "Penny Lane" - The Beatles
- "Rock Ferry" - Deaf School
- "Roll, Alabama, Roll" - traditional sea shanty
- "Rotterdam (Or Anywhere)" - The Beautiful South
- "Santianna" - traditional sea shanty
- "Sealand" - Orchestral Manoeuvres in the Dark
- "Strawberry Fields Forever" - The Beatles
- "Streets of Kenny" - Shack
- "The Other Side Of Liverpool" - Ringo Starr
- "The Skipper's Lament" - John Haines
- "Villiers Terrace" - Echo and the Bunnymen
- "Whiskey on a Sunday" - written by Glyn Hughes, covered by The Dubliners, Danny Doyle
