= Lewis's Building =

Former department store building in Liverpool, England

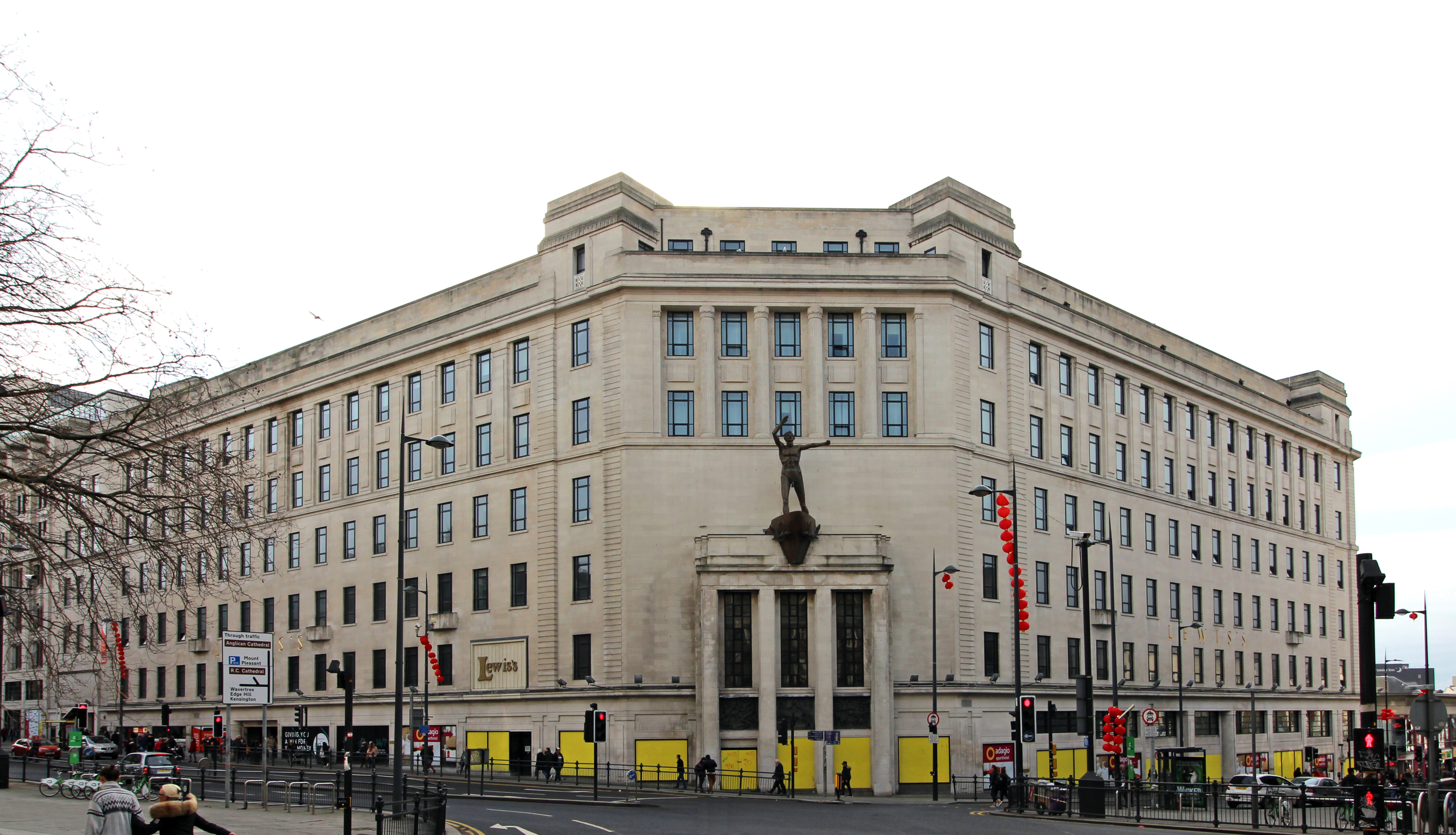
- Interactive map of the Lewis's Building area

General information
- Type: department store
- Location: Liverpool, England, United Kingdom
- Coordinates: 53.4049°N 2.9785°W
- Completed: 1940s/1950s

Technical details
- Floor count: 9
- Floor area: 420,000 sq ft (39,000 m^{2})

Design and construction
- Architect: Gerald de Courcy Fraser
- Main contractor: Fraser, Sons & Geary

The Lewis's Building is a 20th-century Grade II listed building in Liverpool, England. Purpose-built as the flagship store for the now defunct Lewis's department store chain, the building was set to be redeveloped as part of redevelopment project Central Village.

== History ==
In 1856, men's and boys' clothing store Lewis's began trading from a 19th-century building on the current site. This building was eventually replaced in the 1910s and 1920s with a design by Gerald de Courcy Fraser which incorporated the adjacent Watson Building. During the Liverpool Blitz the building was mostly destroyed by bombs, requiring a rebuild which was again taken by Gerald de Courcy Fraser in 1947. The newly constructed nine-storey 420,000 sq ft store opened in 1956 and operated until 29 May 2010.

Since the demise of Lewis's, the building has remained vacant apart from a branch of PureGym currently occupying the basement floor since 2015. The building was set to be redeveloped under a new project called Central Village whereby the new site would consist of 26 units with an average floor space of 620 m^{2} (6,700 sq ft) (although the largest unit covers 2,240 m^{2} or 24,100 sq ft). This would bring the total retail and leisure space in Central Village to around 24,000 m^{2} (260,000 sq ft), effectively making it the third largest shopping centre in Liverpool city centre behind only Liverpool One and St. John's Shopping Centre. Large amounts of office space and a 125-room Adagio hotel were to occupy the remaining floors.

== Sculpture ==
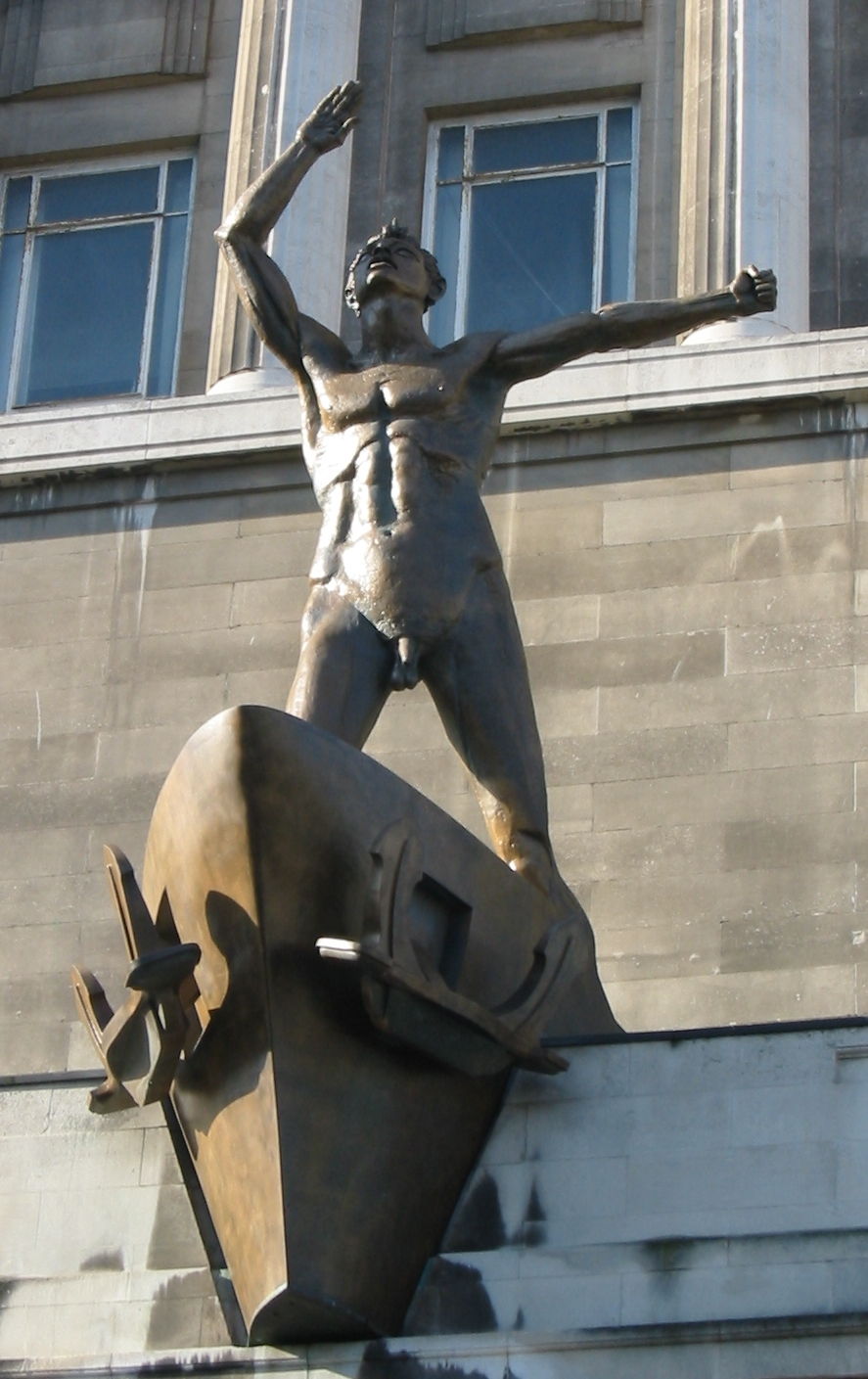
Liverpool Resurgent (1956) by Jacob Epstein

To symbolise Liverpool's resurgence following World War II a statue made by Sir Jacob Epstein of a nude man was added above the building's main entrance. Its official title is Liverpool Resurgent but is nicknamed locally as either 'Nobby Lewis' or 'Dickie Lewis'. The statue was unveiled for Lewis's Centenary celebrations in 1956, which came as the blitzed store had completed rebuilding. It is a well-known local meeting place, and was immortalised in the 1962 anthemic song In My Liverpool Home by Peter McGovern:

"We speak with an accent exceedingly rare,
Meet under a statue exceedingly bare"
