= Littlewoods Pools building =

Building in Liverpool, England

Coordinates: 53.408°N 2.939°W

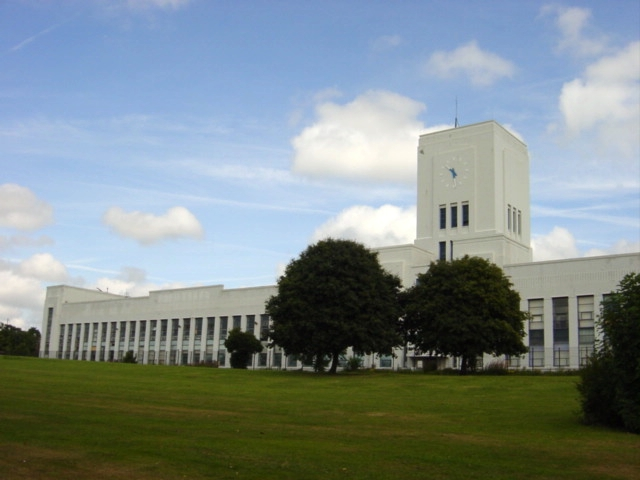
Littlewoods Pools Building

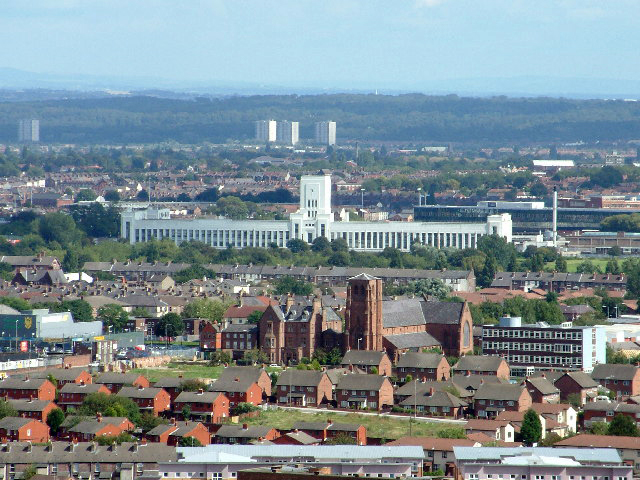
A view of the Littlewoods Building from the Liverpool Anglican Cathedral

The Littlewoods Pools building, located in Liverpool, England, was built in 1938 to serve as the headquarters of the Littlewoods football pools enterprise. It overlooks Edge Lane and Wavertree Botanic Park, and its design makes it a prominent landmark.

The building was requisitioned by the government during World War II to house the postal censorship department, and was later used for the manufacture of floors for Halifax bombers. After returning to Littlewoods' ownership, the site was eventually closed in 1994, and now stands empty. A fire in 2018 caused damage to a large part of the interior. However, plans are underway to convert the building into a film studio, which will be tenanted by Twickenham Studios and Liverpool John Moores University.

== Operational history ==
Littlewoods was a football pools company founded by John Moores in 1923. The company rapidly expanded throughout the 1930s, and the Littlewoods Pools building, opened in 1938, was purpose-built to provide more space for its operations. Designed in the Art Deco style, by architect Gerald de Courcy Fraser, the building is an imposing white-rendered structure consisting of a central clock tower and two long wings terminated by pavilions.

In September 1939, immediately after the outbreak of World War II, the building was requisitioned by the government, becoming the home of the postal censorship department. Its printing presses were also used to print National Registration forms. Later in the war, the building was put to various other uses, including the manufacture of floors for Halifax bombers. In November 1945, the building was handed over to the war casualties department, and was finally released to Littlewoods the following year.

Littlewoods Pools continued to operate out of the building until November 1994, at which time the site was closed and its staff redeployed or made redundant. This was concurrent with the launch of the National Lottery, which immediately became a major rival to the pools industry; the closure of the Edge Lane site was carried out in anticipation of reduced profits as a result of this new competition.

== Regeneration project ==
In May 2016, the two pavilions facing Edge Lane were decorated with large art murals in celebration of Liverpool's creative industry.

In June 2018, developers Capital & Centric announced plans to convert the abandoned Littlewoods building into a studio complex for film and television, with Twickenham Studios expected to take over part of the space. On 2 September, a fire broke out inside the building, causing damage to the roof and upper floor of the west wing. The structure of the building remained sound, however, and Capital & Centric said that the regeneration project would go ahead. Further delay was caused by the need to establish training systems for potential employees. In 2020, Liverpool John Moores University was signed up as the education partner for the new studio, and its second permanent tenant.

In July 2020, the developers secured an £11 million grant from the Liverpool City Region Combined Authority for the creation of two temporary studios on the land adjoining the Littlewoods building. Known as "The Depot", these studios were opened in October 2021.

Remediation work on the main buildings commenced in December 2023, in lieu of work in summer 2024 which will see the creation of two new 20,000 square foot studios on site. In June 2024, the landmark clocktower was demolished for safety reasons, with plans to rebuild.
