= Ruskin High School, Crewe =

Ruskin High School

Location
- Ruskin Road; Crewe, Cheshire, CW2 6UP; England; 53°05′25″N 2°26′50″W

Information
- Type: Community school
- Motto: "High Standards, High Achievers"
- Established: 1902 (1909)
- Local authority: Cheshire East
- Department for Education URN: 111417 Tables
- Ofsted: Reports
- Chair of Governors: John Rhodes
- Headteacher: Dean Postlethwaite
- Gender: Coeducational
- Age: 11 to 16
- Enrolment: 651 pupils
- Website: http://www.ruskinhighschool.co.uk/

Ruskin Community High School is a coeducational comprehensive secondary school in Crewe, Cheshire, England, for pupils aged 11 to 16 years.

== History ==
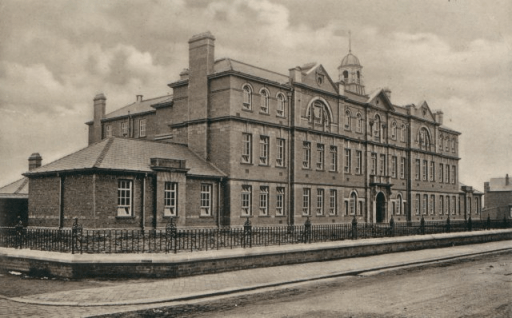
Crewe County Secondary School 1919

The school was opened in 1902 as Crewe County Secondary School in rooms at the then Technical College in Flag Lane, and moved to the new Ruskin Road building in 1909. The name changed to Crewe County Grammar School after the Education Act 1944. The last CCGS reunion was held in 2012 for pupils who entered the school in 1971 or 1972. When secondary education in Crewe was reorganised the school became fully comprehensive as the Ruskin County High School in 1978. It achieved specialist school status in 2002 after an application to the Specialist Schools Trust and fund-raising.

== Recent developments ==
The school specialises in sport, and briefly modern foreign languages. The refurbished sports hall was opened in October 2005, whilst a new dining hall was completed in spring 2006. When the school was awarded Sports College Status, five floodlit tennis courts were built at a cost of almost £250,000.

Ruskin celebrated its centenary year on the Ruskin Road site in 2009. The celebrations officially began on Friday, 9 January 2009, with an assembly involving pupils and staff, ex-staff, ex-pupils and government officials. Assembly was followed by a tree planting service and concluded with a memorial service, during which a bench was dedicated to each of the three pupils who lost their lives while pupils at the school.

Ruskin also built a Dance and Drama studio as an extension to the sports hall and it has been opened since February 2025.

== Alumni ==
- Blaster Bates, explosives and demolition expert and raconteur
- Ian Butterworth, defender for Norwich City
- William Cooper (pseudonym of H.S. Hoff), novelist
- Alan Gibbons, children's author
- Norman Hughes, Olympic bronze medallist hockey player in the 1984 Olympics
- Mark Price, Baron Price, managing director of Waitrose between 2007–16
- Colin Prophett, footballer
- Chloe Lloyd, model
- David "Steve" Jones, DJ, musician and TV presenter
- Greg Tiernan, animator and director

== See also ==
- List of places in Cheshire
- List of schools in Cheshire East
