= Alhambra, Blackpool =

Alhambra
- The Alhambra within Blackpool
- Address: Bank Hey Street; Blackpool; United Kingdom
- Coordinates: 53.81671°N 3.05539°W
- Capacity: Theatre: 3,000; Circus: 2,000; Ballroom: 3,000

Construction
- Opened: 1899
- Closed: 1902
- Demolished: 1961
- Architects: Wylson & Long

The Alhambra was an entertainment complex in Blackpool, Lancashire, England, from 1899 to 1903. A financial disaster, the building was bought by the Blackpool Tower Company and reopened in 1904 as the Palace. The building was demolished in 1961 to make way for Lewis's department store.

== Construction ==
The land on which the Alhambra was built was originally the site of the Prince of Wales Theatre and Baths, which had opened in 1877. The Alhambra (Blackpool) Limited company was formed, with support from local publican and former acrobat Henry Brooks. £220,000 was authorised for the build and shares in the company were offered to the general public in 1897. They sold out immediately; 3/5 of the shareholders came from Lancashire, and 1/8 from Blackpool. Against competition from Frank Matcham and C. J. Phipps, architects Wylson & Long of London won the design contract. The foundation stone was laid on 18 December 1897 and the building work, undertaken by Whitehead & Son of Blackpool, took two years to complete.

=== Architecture and features ===
Externally, the Alhambra's facade was designed in the French Renaissance style, with decorations in Burmantofts terracotta. It was a four-storey building with twin conical domes on the roof.

The completed building contained three large spaces; a 3,000-seat theatre, a 3,000-capacity ballroom and a 2,000-seat circus, as well as a winter roof garden and restaurants. These were very similar to the facilities provided by the Blackpool Tower buildings. The three-tiered circus took up one side of the building and the ballroom occupied the floor above it. The four-tiered theatre was on the other side of the building. Between the circus and the theatre was a large central entrance hall with staircases leading to restaurants.

== Early years ==
The Alhambra was opened in the middle of the 1899 season, before its construction was complete. It was immediately a financial disaster. Although it was popular with visitors, the company was unable to recoup the costs of the land and construction (£382,000), and the artistes employed. In 1900, its first full season, approximately £50,000 of share capital was written off and the Alhambra closed two years later. According to John K. Walton, the problems were due to financial mismanagement. It was the first development in Blackpool to face such financial failure.

== Palace ==
The Blackpool Tower Company took over the Alhambra in 1904 and employed Frank Matcham to redesign the interior. It was reopened as the Palace in 1904 and was far more successful than its predecessor. The new building had one of the first moving staircases in the world. A cinema was added in 1911 and in 1914, an underground passage was built that connected the Palace to the Tower buildings. The Palace was demolished in 1961 to make way for Lewis's department store, which was later replaced by Woolworths.

== Legacy ==
The building may have been demolished in 1961, but its name lives on by means of the Palace Shield, a league competition for cricket teams in the Blackpool, Preston, and surrounding districts of Lancashire. This competition, initially the Alhambra Shield was founded in 1902, becoming the Palace Shield from 1907, with the championship shield and medals being provided by the owners of the Alhambra complex.
