= Beatties =

Former British department store chain

- Type: Subsidiary of House of Fraser
- Industry: Retail
- Genre: Department store
- Founded: Wolverhampton (1877)
- Fate: Remaining stores trading as House of Fraser & Frasers
- Headquarters: Wolverhampton, West Midlands, England
- Products: Clothing, cosmetics, housewares
- Parent: House of Fraser
- Website: Beatties (archived version); House of Fraser

Beatties was a small British department store group located primarily in the Midlands of England. In 2005, when it had 12 stores, the group was acquired by House of Fraser. On 14 January 2006, the Birmingham store closed, because a similar House of Fraser store, Rackhams, was not far away. In August 2007, the Telford store was rebranded, along with the Solihull and Sutton Coldfield stores. The group gradually rebranded all its branches under the House of Fraser name. In January 2010 the Dudley branch was closed.

On 7 June 2018, it was announced that the last branch which had retained the Beatties name, the former head office in Wolverhampton, was to close in 2019. Former Beatties-branded House of Fraser stores in Aylesbury, Birkenhead, Telford and Worcester were also announced to close.

Despite the CVA, Mike Ashley started saving stores on the basis of whether they could cut rent to achieve a specific margin. The Telford branch proposed closure was repealed on 23 August 2018, the first to be repealed. As of December 2018, all ‘Beatties’ currently trading are announced to be remaining open.

== History ==
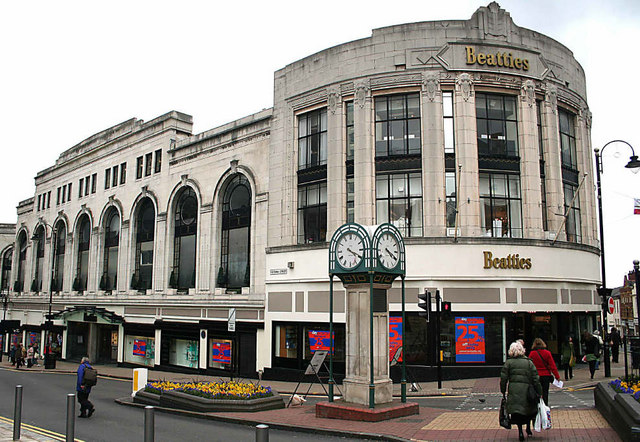
The first Beatties store in Wolverhampton.

Beatties was founded in 1877 and had grown from a small family drapery business in Wolverhampton to a department store with an excellent reputation for customer service. The first store on Victoria Street, Wolverhampton, was rebuilt in a neo-classical style by the architect Gerald de Courcy Fraser in 1929. The Company Policy (known as the Four Corners of Responsibility) stated that the responsibility to the customer was

"To provide the customer with a good range of well chosen, good value merchandise. To offer this to the public in attractive surroundings, backed by pleasant and effective service, and in an atmosphere of complete integrity and responsibility. To demonstrate at all times a genuine desire to please".

On joining Beatties, each member of staff (known as a "Member") was presented with a "Members' Guide" to provide members with information about the company and its policies, the condition of service offered, the facilities available and the rules to be followed.

== Staff structure ==
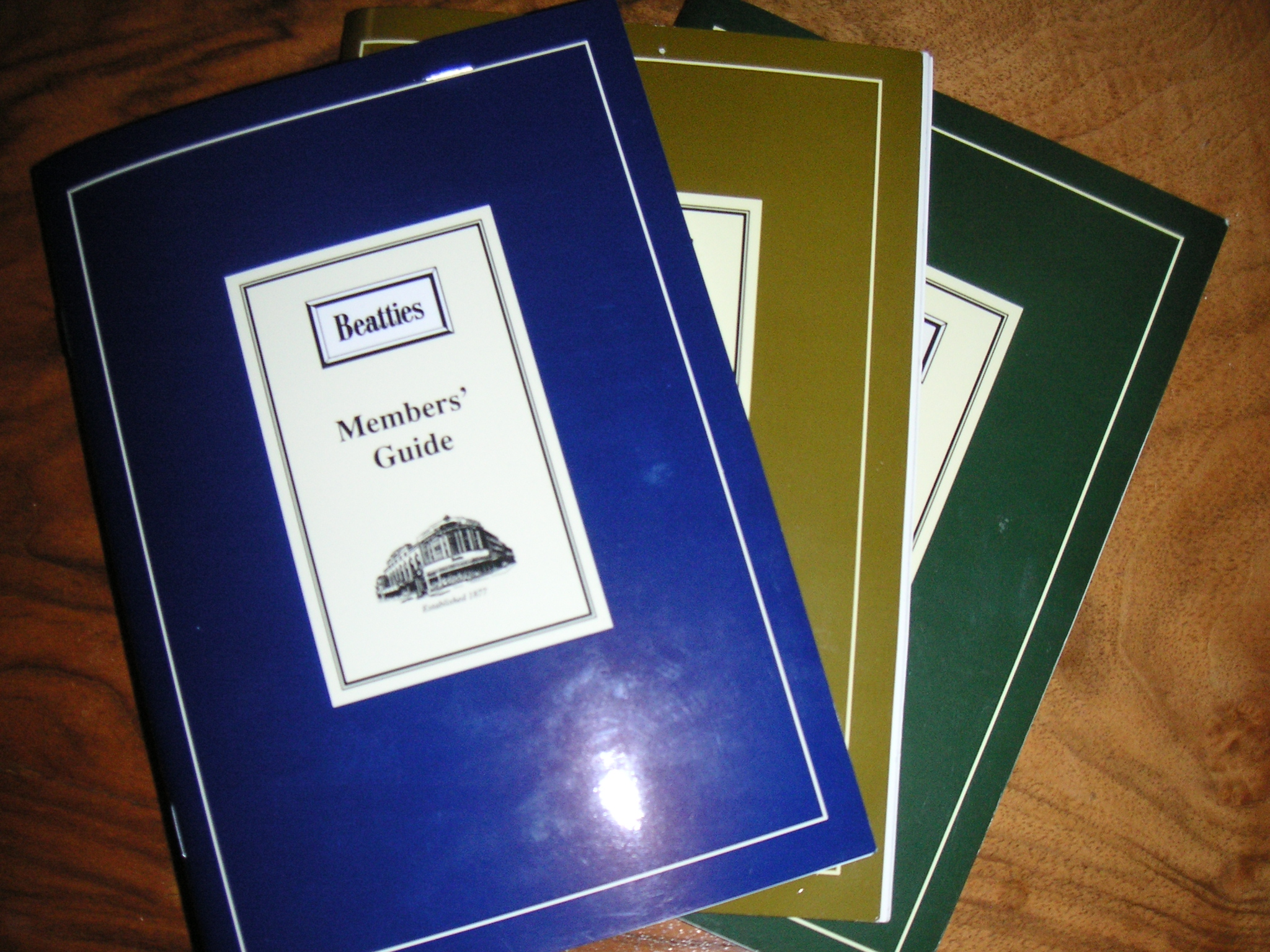
Members' Guide books issued to staff on joining Beatties

General Manager (GM), Assistant General Manager (AGM), Personnel Manager (PM), Department Sales Manager (DSM), Assistant Sales Manager (ASM), Loss Prevention Officer (Plain Clothes Security), Sales Assistants, Deck Service Personnel (Warehouse and Delivery), Catering Personnel (for Staff and Customer Restaurant)

Managers at Department level and above were known as Grade 1 members. Managers at Assistant Manager level were known as Grade 2 members.

As well as Beatties own staff the store also employed concession managers and staff. The majority of these were in Perfumery and Ladies fashions but there were also a number of Jewellery concessions.

== Department store locations ==
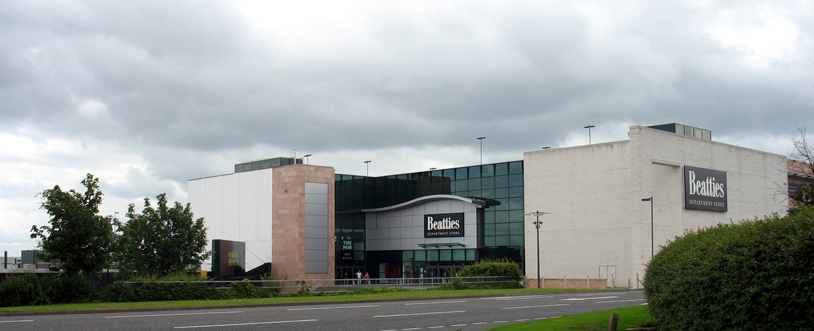
The Beatties department store in Telford prior to August 2007 rebranding to House of Fraser.

All stores now trade as House of Fraser, except the former Wolverhampton flagship store which is currently empty following the opening of Frasers in the former Debenhams department store in the Mander Centre.

- Aylesbury, Buckinghamshire
- Sutton Coldfield, West Midlands
- Telford, Shropshire ( Now a Frasers Department Store)
- Worcester, Worcestershire

=== Former locations ===
- Birmingham, West Midlands (closed January 2006)
- Burton upon Trent, Staffordshire (closed September 2012)
- Dudley, West Midlands (closed January 2010; building now partly occupied by Iceland)
- Northampton, Northamptonshire (closed 2014; building now occupied by Next and Primark)
- Birkenhead (closed March 2020)
- Huddersfield, West Yorkshire (closed August 2022)
- Solihull, West Midlands (closed 28 August 2023)
- Wolverhampton, West Midlands (Closed and relocated as Frasers Department Store in Mander Shopping Centre)
