= David Lewis (English merchant) =

British merchant and philanthropist

David Lewis (19 December 1823 – 4 December 1885), was a British merchant and philanthropist. The founder of Lewis's department store in Liverpool, in 1879 he conceived the idea of what is claimed to be the world's first Christmas grotto, entitled 'Christmas Fairyland'. This first is listed in the Guinness Book of Records.

== Biography ==
Lewis was born in London in 1823, the son of Wolfe Levy, a Jewish merchant. Settling in Liverpool in 1840 and changing his surname from Levy to Lewis, he worked for the tailors and outfitters Benjamin Hyam & Co. By 1856 he had accumulated enough capital to start his own business as a boys' clothier in Ranelagh Street. Subsequently, he opened a second establishment in Bold Street; and thereafter he gradually developed one of the largest retail businesses of the kind in England, erecting an establishment of the "Universal Provider" or department store class (Lewis's). Similar stores were founded by him in Manchester, Sheffield, Leeds, and Birmingham.

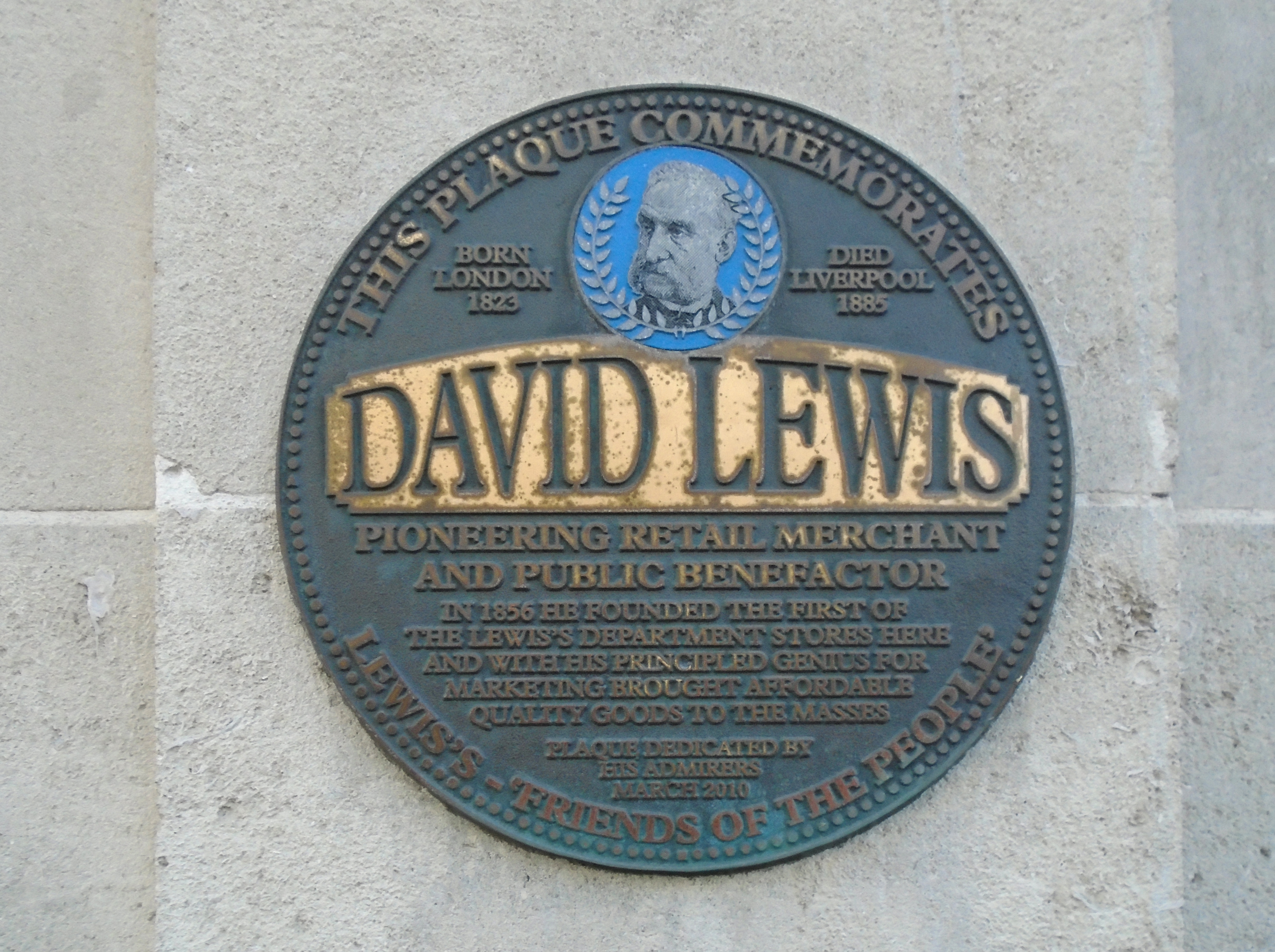
Commemorative plaque on the wall of Lewis's store in Ranelagh Street, Liverpool

== Philanthropy ==
Lewis's ample means were freely given in aid of charitable and philanthropic works. He headed the local subscription list for the persecuted Jews of Russia with a donation of £1,000 ($5,000), and gave large sums in support of the synagogue. For many years he held the position of warden and treasurer of the Old Hebrew Congregation, Liverpool.

He died in 1885 and is buried next to his wife Bertha in Deane Road cemetery, Kensington, Liverpool.

At his death he bequeathed very large sums (nearly a half-million sterling) for the erection of hospitals and other philanthropic institutions, which constitute some of the most important in Liverpool.

== Legacy ==
The David Lewis Centre based in Little Warford, Cheshire, a charity providing residential accommodation for people with epilepsy and other neurological conditions, continues to operate under the David Lewis name, having been established with the funds from his estate.

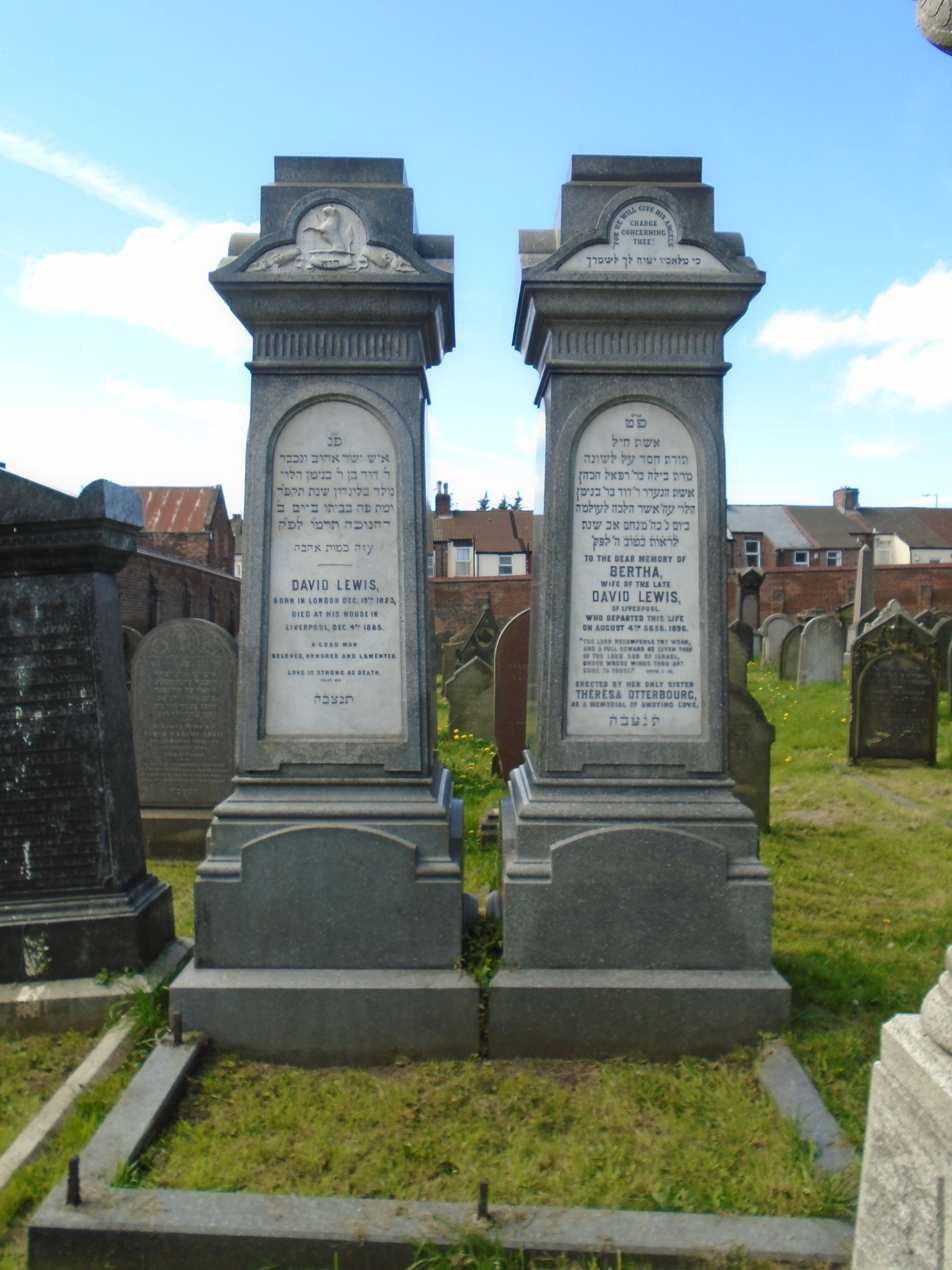
Graves of David and Bertha Lewis in Deane Road cemetery

David Lewis Street in central Liverpool, connecting Gradwell and Fleet Streets, is named after him.

== See also ==
- Lewis's

== Sources ==
- Jewish Chronicle, 11 Dec. 1885, p. 12.
- Liverpool Leader, 6 Dec. 1875.
- Asa Briggs, Friends of the People: The Centenary History of Lewis's (London: B.T. Batsford, 1956).

This article incorporates text from a publication now in the public domain: Singer, Isidore; et al., eds. (1901–1906). "Lewis, David". The Jewish Encyclopedia. New York: Funk & Wagnalls.
