= Little Warford =

Village in Cheshire, England

Coordinates: 53.287148°N 2.286387°W

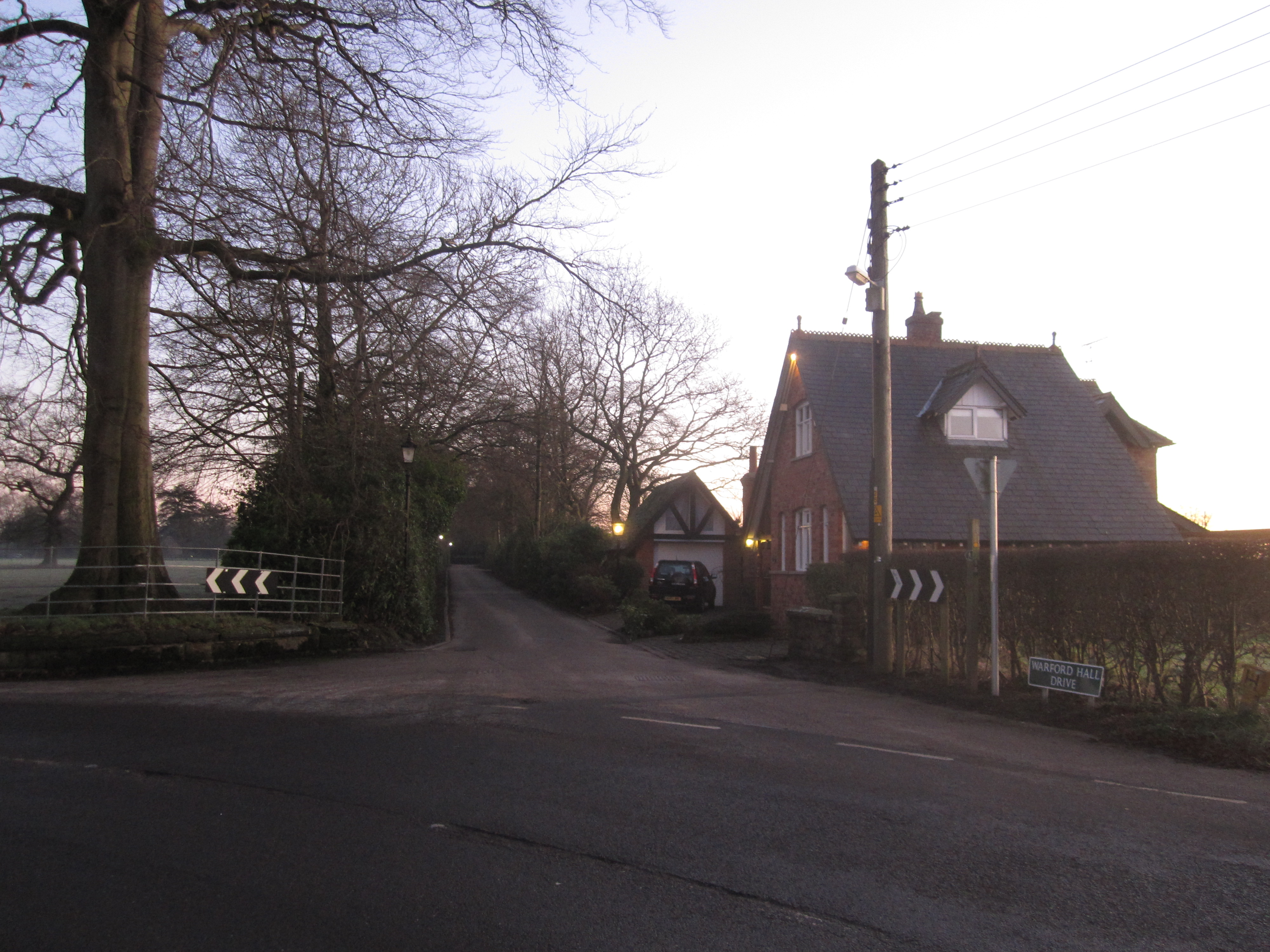
- Warford Hall Drive, Little Warford

- Location within Cheshire
- Population: 275 (2001)
- OS grid reference: SJ810767
- Civil parish: Little Warford
- Unitary authority: Cheshire East
- Ceremonial county: Cheshire
- Region: North West
- Country: England
- Sovereign state: United Kingdom
- Post town: STOCKPORT
- Postcode district: SK9
- Dialling code: 01565
- Police: Cheshire
- Fire: Cheshire
- Ambulance: North West
- UK Parliament: Tatton

Little Warford is a village and civil parish in the unitary authority of Cheshire East and the ceremonial county of Cheshire, England. It has a population of 275. The parish contains the David Lewis Centre, a charity set up by David Lewis, the founder of Lewis's. It is a registered charity which aims to provide medical, educational, residential and assessment services for people with epilepsy and other neurological conditions.

== Governance ==
Little Warford civil parish was created in 1951 when the civil parish of Marthall cum Warford was abolished and divided into two parts: Little Warford and Marthall civil parishes. It was in Bucklow Rural District until 1974, after which it was served by Macclesfield Borough Council; this in turn was succeeded on 1 April 2009 by the new unitary authority of Cheshire East.

Marthall cum Warford had been a township in Rostherne ancient parish, and had been created a separate civil parish in 1866. It had been in Bucklow Hundred. From 1836 to 1895 it had been in Altrincham Poor Law Union, when it was transferred to Bucklow Poor Law Union until 1930. It was also in Altrincham Rural Sanitary District. From 1894 to 1895 it had been in Altrincham Rural District, and from 1895 to 1951 it had been part of Bucklow Rural District.

Little Warford is in the Tatton constituency for the UK parliament, although the area had previously been in Knutsford constituency (1885–1983), the Mid Cheshire (1867–1885), the North Cheshire (1832–1867), and the Cheshire (1543–1832) constituencies.

== Listed building ==
The parish contains one listed building, a house from the 17th century known as The Wheelwright's Shop. It is listed at Grade II, the lowest of the three listings designated by English Heritage, which is applied to "buildings of national importance and special interest".

== Notes and references ==
=== Bibliography ===
- Harris, B. E., ed. (1979). The Victoria history of the county of Chester. (Volume II). Oxford: Oxford University Press. ISBN 0-19-722749-X.
- Youngs, F. A. (1991). Guide to the local administrative units of England. (Volume 1: Northern England). London: Royal Historical Society. ISBN 0-86193-127-0.
