= Rapid Discount Outlet =

Former DIY retailer in Liverpool, England

Coordinates: 53.4025°N 2.9761°W

Rapid Hardware Ltd
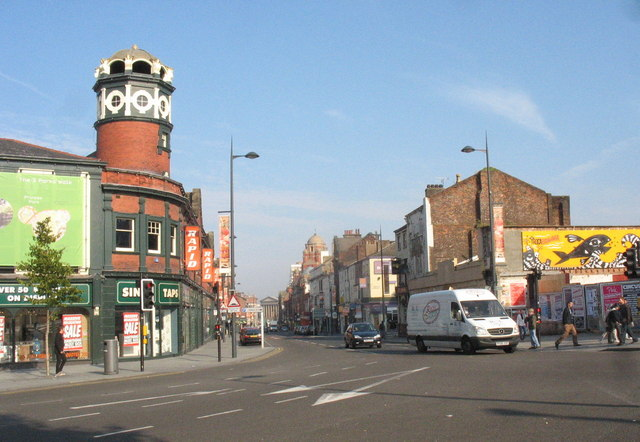
- St Luke's Place showing the original location of Rapid Hardware, September 2008
- Formerly: Rapid Discount then later on Rapid Hardware Ltd
- Type: DIY Retailer
- Industry: Retail
- Founded: 1971; Renshaw Street, Liverpool
- Founder: Hugh Doherty
- Defunct: 30 May 2017
- Fate: Administration
- Headquarters: Basnett Street, Liverpool
- Number of locations: 1
- Products: DIY Home improvement tools Gardening supplies and plants
- Number of employees: 100
- Parent: Rapid Group Holdings

Rapid Discount Outlet, formerly known as Rapid Hardware, was a Liverpool local DIY and home improvement retailing company. The company was run by Martin Doherty and Daniel Doherty between 2008 and 2017.

== History ==
Rapid Hardware was opened by its founder Hugh Doherty in 1971, with one small store on Renshaw Street. It grew to over 200,000 sq ft of retail selling space employing over 300 people. In 2009 Rapid featured in the BBC TV series The Apprentice, in which all the candidates from the series had to pitch their ideas to store managers.

In 2009, the retailer relocated to the former George Henry Lee store, as the company grew. In the new building, Rapid expanded its product range to include home and garden, kitchens, lighting, bathrooms, indoor and outdoor furniture and homeware and hardware products.

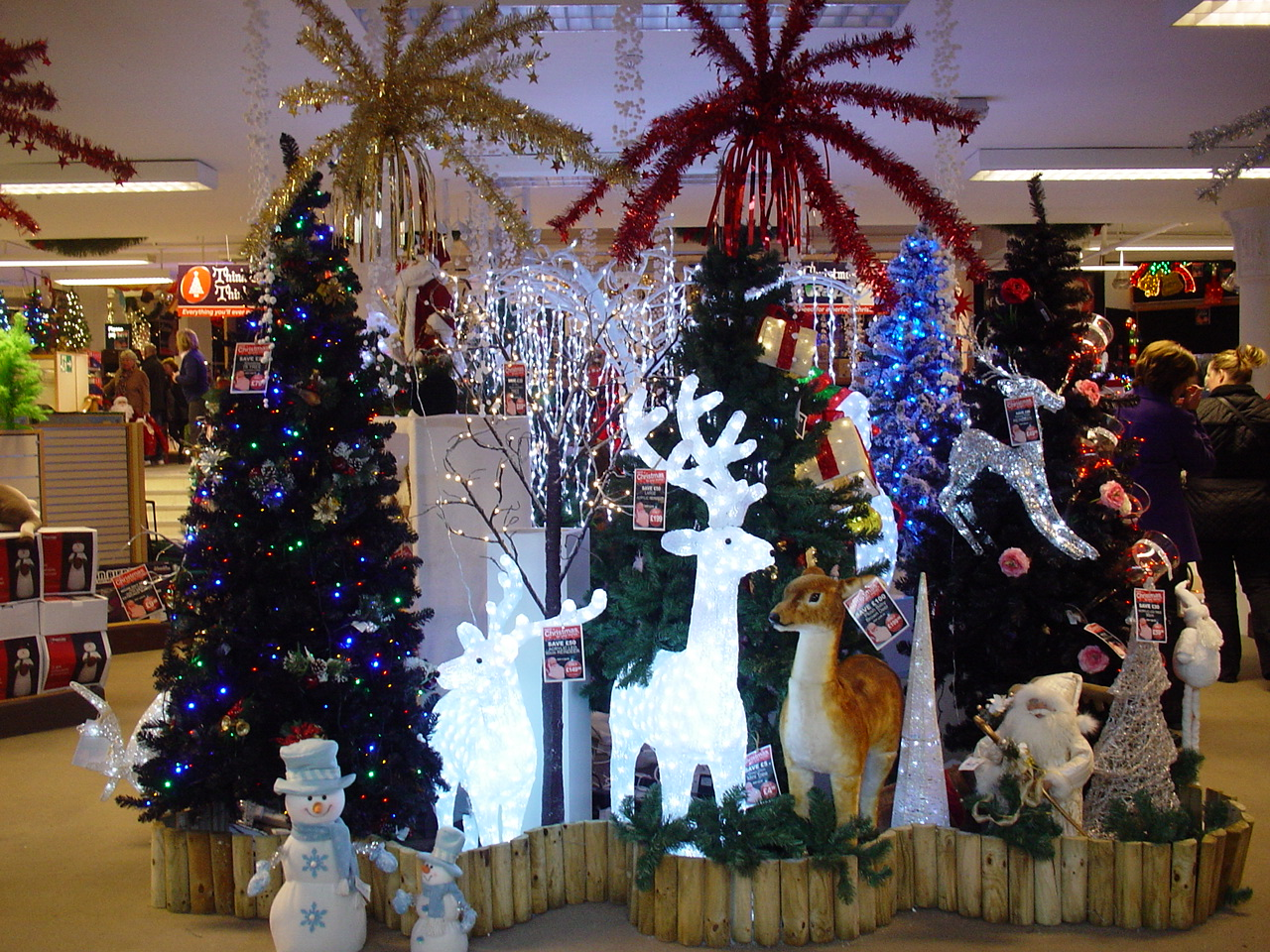
Christmas display inside Rapid Hardware, Liverpool (2012).

In February 2013, Rapid Hardware went into administration. The administration was handled by Duff & Phelps. When the company went into administration it owed £2.97m.

The store re-opened in the same premises, with the name Rapid Discount Outlet, in May 2013. The company then went into administration for the second time in May 2017 with the store closing on 30 May.
