= Lewis's =

Former British department store chain

Coordinates: 53°24′18.1″N 2°58′45.2″W

- Type: Department store
- Industry: Retail
- Founded: Liverpool, 1856; 170 years ago
- Founder: David Lewis
- Defunct: 29 May 2010; 16 years ago
- Fate: Lease unable to be renewed, brand name bought, grotto re-opened
- Successor: Lewis's Home Retail
- Headquarters: Liverpool, England
- Key people: David Thompson; Sir Philip Green; David Lewis; Louis Cohen; Rex Cohen; Lord Woolton
- Parent: LHR Holdings Ltd
- Website: lewiss.co.uk

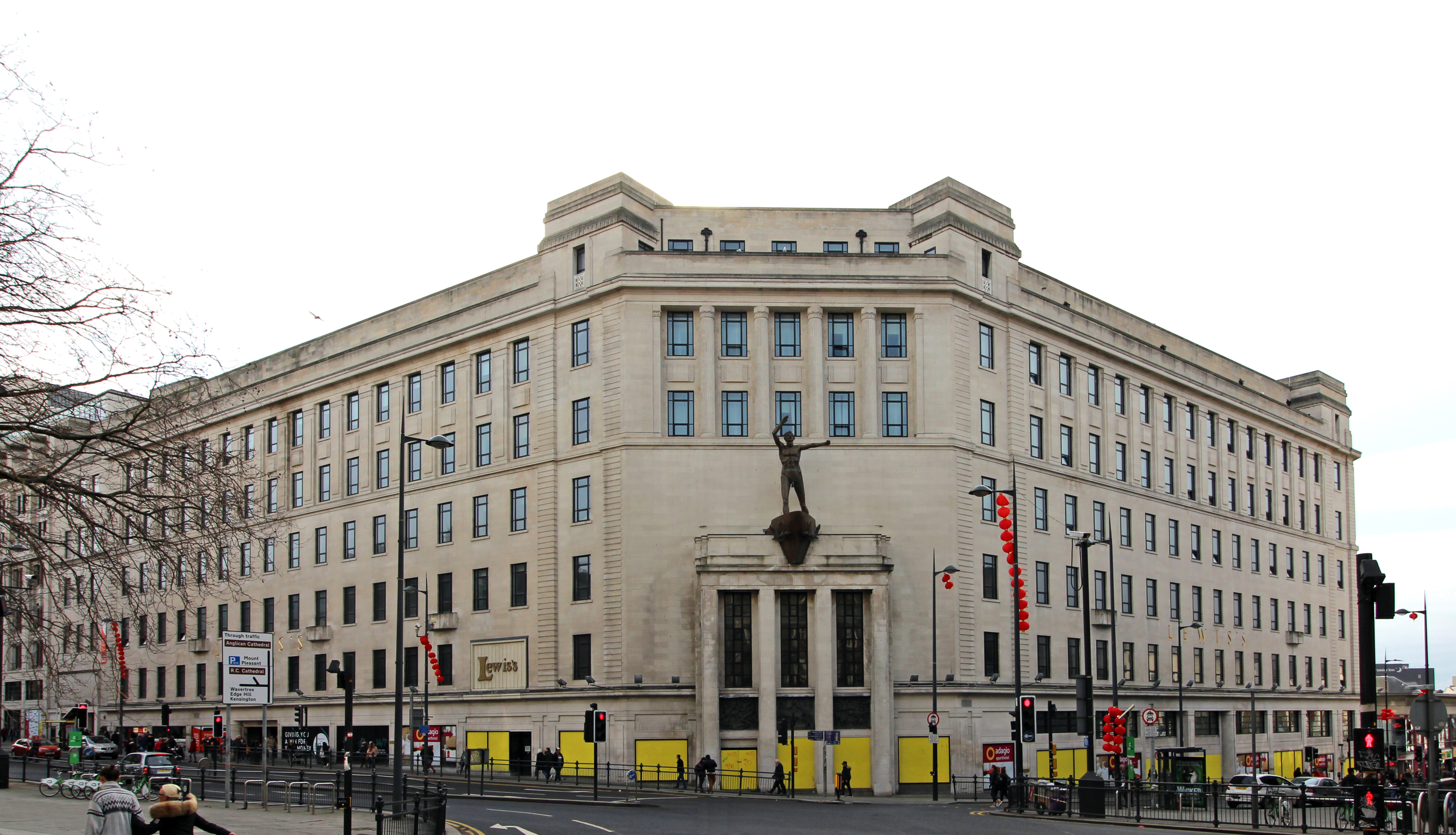
Lewis's Building, Liverpool

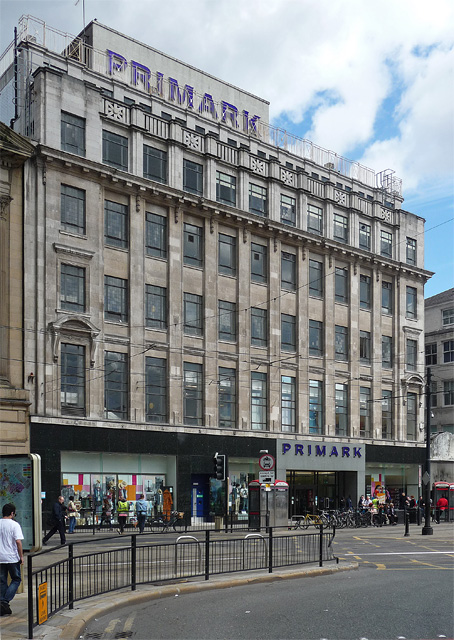
Former Lewis's Department Store, Market Street, Manchester (as Primark, in 2008)

Lewis's is an online retailer and homeware brand. It was also a chain of British department stores that operated from 1856 to 2010. The owners of Lewis's went into administration several times, including in 1991. The first store, which opened in Liverpool city centre, became the flagship of the chain. Several stores in the chain were bought in 1991 by the company Owen Owen and continued to operate under the Lewis's brand name for several years, but after the closure of the Manchester store in 2001, only the original Liverpool store continued to trade under the Lewis's name. This store was sold in 2007 to Vergo Retail Ltd and closed in 2010.

Lewis's was briefly a member of the International Association of Department Stores, from 1951 to 1953.

== History ==
The first Lewis's was opened in 1856 in Liverpool by entrepreneur David Lewis, as a men's and boys' clothing store, mostly manufacturing his own stock. In 1864, Lewis's branched out into women's clothing. In the 1870s, the store expanded and added departments, including shoes in 1874, and tobacco in 1879. His motto was Friends of the People, and he intended the shopping experience to be inclusive.

The first Lewis's outside Liverpool opened in nearby Manchester in 1877. Another store was opened, at the suggestion of Joseph Chamberlain, on the new Corporation Street in Birmingham in 1885. The Manchester store included a full scale ballroom on the fifth floor, which was also used for exhibitions. Buying offices were also located on the fifth floor until a takeover by Liverpool-based competitor Owen Owen (see below). A fourth store opened in Sheffield in 1884 but proved unprofitable and closed in 1888.

After the death of Lewis in 1885, his nephew Louis Cohen took over the business, and oversaw a period of consolidation. After Cohen's death in 1922, control passed to Harold and his younger brother Rex Cohen, who took the company public in 1924. Harold was the first chairman of the new public liability company until his death in 1936. New stores were once again opened, in Glasgow (1929), Leeds (1932), Hanley in Stoke-on-Trent (1934) and Leicester (1936), many of which were designed by the company architect, Gerald de Courcy Fraser. Lewis's were generally among the largest department stores in their cities.

Frederick James Marquis dominated the company after Rex Cohen's death in 1928. When he joined the board in 1920, aged 37, he was the first member of the board outside of the family. He became director in 1928 and chairman in 1936. Between 1929-1939 the company continued to expand against a difficult national economic background.

Lewis's took over the Royal Welsh Warehouse—the company that started large-scale mail order—in 1938. The company responded to the Anschluss with a total boycott of goods imported from Nazi Germany, despite pressure from the pro-appeasement National Government of Neville Chamberlain.

In 1951, the Lewis's group purchased the famous London department store Selfridges, expanding that brand by adding Moultons of Ilford in 1962 and rebranding it Selfridges. In 1965, Lewis's became part of the Sears Group headed by Charles Clore. In 1966, the group launched Miss Selfridge fashions, which later became a store chain in its own right.

A branch was opened on Blackpool promenade, next to Blackpool Tower, in 1964 on the site of the Alhambra. The building had a distinctive 1960s design, with a turquoise tiled exterior. After it closed in 1993, building work was undertaken to remove some of the upper floors and the redeveloped site housed a Mecca bingo hall, with part of the ground floor space being subsequently occupied by Woolworths, and later by Poundland, Harry Ramsden's and a variety of smaller retail units.

The company's Manchester store was one of several targets attacked by the Provisional Irish Republican Army (IRA) on 27 January 1975.

=== Christmas grotto ===
The world's first Christmas grotto opened in Lewis's in 1879, entitled 'Christmas Fairyland'; a concept devised by the store's founder David Lewis, this first is listed in the Guinness Book of Records. A staple of Liverpool's festive season, many generations first visited Father Christmas here, with the final displays covering over 10,000 square feet (930 m^{2}). In 2010, the Lewis's grotto manager, display team and staff moved the Lewis's Christmas Grotto to the fourth floor of Rapid Hardware, in the former George Henry Lee (John Lewis) building.

=== Decline ===
The company went into administration in 1991 as a result of a combination of problems, including the early 1990s recession and failing to compete effectively. This resulted in Liverpool competitor Owen Owen buying up several branches of Lewis's (but retaining the Lewis's brand name on those purchased stores). Sir Philip Green revived the selling of toys on a large scale, by launching the brand Kids HQ in four Lewis's Owen Owen stores, including those in Liverpool and Manchester. The Leicester branch traded independently for a short while, following a management buyout, as 'Lewis's of Leicester', before eventually closing. Other branches, including the Birmingham store, closed down.

After the 1996 Manchester bombing by the IRA, trading space in Lewis's was rented to Marks & Spencer and other smaller retailers displaced following heavy damage to the Corn Exchange. Marks & Spencer and the small retailers moved into new accommodation in 1999; Lewis's suffered from a smaller footfall thereafter, and attempted to remain in business by reinventing itself as partially a 'discount retailer'. In a final attempt to arrest the decline, the remainder-clothing retailer TK Maxx was invited to trade from the basement floor. In 2001, the Manchester branch ceased trading; the premises are now occupied by a branch of Primark.

The last store to trade as Lewis's was the Liverpool original. This followed the sale of other branches of Lewis's from Owen Owen to other operators, including Debenhams and Allders, during the 1990s.

On 28 February 2007, the Liverpool store went into liquidation. On 23 March 2007, it was sold as a going concern to Vergo Retail Ltd., enabling the store to continue to trade as Lewis's. The store closed permanently on 29 May 2010 as the lease could not be renewed. Until it closed the building retained its original lifts, controlled by a lift operator rather than users.

== Rebirth ==
After Vergo Retail went into administration in 2010, the rights to the Lewis's name were bought by Lewis's Home Retail Ltd. They intended to open a home store in Bury later that year, and have since bought out six branches of TJ Hughes, including the Liverpool branch, which was also the first branch of Owen Owen.

Lewis's Home Retail purchased seven Paul Simon Homeware stores in 2014 and relaunched them under the Lewis's brand. This coincided with the launch of TJ Hughes 'Lewis's' branded homeware goods. The items are tagged 'Established 1856', referencing the historic store. Lewis's Home Retail also owns Lewis's related brand names including 'Kids HQ' and 'Owen Owen'.

== Former branches ==
- Ranelagh Street, Liverpool (1856–2010) – now part of the Central Village development, partially occupied by PureGym and Adagio Aparthotel
- Bold Street, Liverpool (1859-c. 1878)
- Bon Marché, Basnett Street, Liverpool (1877-1950s)
- Manchester (1877–2001) – now Primark
- Sheffield (1884–1888), store selling tea at 15 Waingate, then moved to Pinstone Street
- Birmingham (1883–1991) initially a tea warehouse in New Street, expanded into the whole block bounded by Corporation Street, Bull Street and Corporation Square – now offices, shops, restaurants and County Court
- Argyle Street, Glasgow (1929–1991) – became Debenhams, now vacant
- The Headrow, Leeds (1932–1996) – became an Allders, now Broadgate Office and retail units including Sainsbury's
- Hanley, Stoke-on-Trent (1934–1998) – Lamb Street until 1963 when moved to new building on north side of Lamb Street, which became Debenhams in 1998 until Debenhams became defunct.
- Humberstone Gate, Leicester (1936–1993) – demolished (except the original high tower at the western end of M&S now a city landmark)
- Bristol (1958–1981) – bought by John Lewis, subsequently occupied by Bentalls, House of Fraser, and then Primark
- Blackpool (1964–1993) – became Mecca Bingo and Woolworths
- Weston Favell (Supa-Centre) (1975–1985)
- Newcastle upon Tyne (1985–87) – replaced by Hamleys, then Mark One and HMV, now JD Sports
- Preston (1980s-1990s) – former Owen Owen store.
- Oxford (1989–1996) – originally G R Cooper, bought by Selfridges in 1966. Original store demolished 1973 as part of Westgate development and replaced with new store. Subsequently Allders 1996-2005, later Primark 2006-2016 when they relocated to a larger unit in the extended part of the centre; original store partially demolished in 2016, now smaller units
- Lakeside Shopping Centre (1989-1991)
- London (Selfridges)
- Ellesmere Port (Supa-Centre)
- Planned store in Cheadle, Greater Manchester

== Current branches ==
There are non-original stores owned and operated by Lewis's Home Retail Limited, and are former Paul Simon Stores rebranded under the Lewis's name in Chelmsford and Harlow in Essex.

== Lewis's Bank ==
From 1928, Lewis's included a banking department in each store. It was incorporated as a subsidiary limited company in 1934, and was owned by Martins Bank from 1958 to 1967 when it was bought by Lloyds Bank. It continued to operate into the 1980s.

=== Lewis's Bank under Martins' ownership ===
Details of the nine year ownership 1958 - 1967 of Lewis's Bank by Martins Bank are published within the Martins Bank Archive. Lewis's retained its name and operated as a separate entity to Martins throughout. Martins Bank Archive maintains a Lewis's Bank staff database covering the nine years, and family tree researchers can enquire about new entrants, transferred and/or promoted staff, marriages, retirements and deaths.

== Popular culture ==
- The store gave rise to the well-known phrase "Standing there like one of Lewis's". As a popular meeting place for dating couples, 'standing like one of Lewis's' referred to being 'stood up'. It has also been described as being due to idle staff, the statues by Jacob Epstein (Liverpool Resurgent) at the Liverpool branch, and The Man of Fire at the Hanley branch, or the reputation of the Lewis's Arcade at the Manchester store (as popularised in the 1960 film: Hell is a City)
- The 1990 claymation of Terry Pratchett's Truckers has short interior scenes shot at the Manchester branch of Lewis's, as appears in the credits.
- The line "Meet under a statue exceedingly bare" in the chorus of the folk-style song "In my Liverpool Home" is a reference to the naked male statue "Liverpool Resurgent", by Jacob Epstein, on the outside of the Liverpool Lewis's building, standing over the main entrance portico. It referred to the custom of Liverpudlians who were planning to meet in town to agree to 'meet under the man'.

== See also ==
- Sears Group (Sears plc) (unrelated to Sears of the USA)
- Bill Smith (fell runner)
- Blacklers (another Liverpool Department Store)
- David Lewis Centre
