= David Lewis Centre =

British health and disability foundation

David Lewis (also known as the 'David Lewis National Epilepsy Centre', David Lewis School and 'The David Lewis Centre' is a health foundation based in Little Warford, Cheshire. It provides residential accommodation, education and health services to people with epilepsy, autism learning and physical disabilities.

It is a registered charity under English law and in 2007–8 had a gross income of over £27 million, the majority of which comes from local authorities. David Lewis employs over 800 staff.

It was founded in 1893 by the estate, and to continue the work, of the Victorian philanthropist David Lewis (1823–1885) of Liverpool who had founded the Lewis's retail stores.
