= The Spinners (English band) =

British folk music group

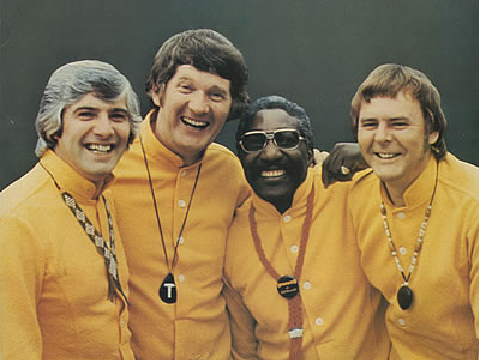
- The Spinners; From left to right: Mick Groves, Tony Davis, Cliff Hall, Hughie Jones

Background information
- Origin: Liverpool, England
- Genres: Folk music, skiffle
- Years active: 1958–1989
- Labels: Philips, EMI
- Past members: Tony Davis; Mick Groves; Cliff Hall; Hughie Jones; Jacqueline MacDonald

The Spinners were a folk group from Liverpool, England, who formed in September 1958. They variously had four albums in the UK Albums Chart between September 1970 and April 1972. One of them, Spinners Live Performance (1971), spent three months in the listing and peaked at No. 14.

== Career ==
The band began as a skiffle group with a mainly American repertoire, until they were prompted by Redd Sullivan, a seaman, to include sea shanties and English folk songs. They started out as the Gin Mill Skiffle Group, which included guitarist Tony Davis and washboard player Mick Groves. The group played the Cavern Club in Liverpool for the first time on 18 January 1957, with the Muskrat Jazz Band and the Liverpool University Jazz Band. They played there on a number of occasions during that summer. In September 1958, they became the Spinners. They founded a folk club in Liverpool, the Triton Club (whilst they were still called 'The Liverpool Spinners'), but soon were performing in London at places such as The Troubadour coffee house. Their first album, Songs Spun in Liverpool (released under the group name of 'The Liverpool Spinners'), was recorded by Bill Leader from live performances. In 1962 Peter Kennedy of the English Folk Dance & Song Society recorded an album with them called Quayside Songs Old & New. In 1963 Philips Records signed them, and they recorded eight more albums over the next eight years. They signed with EMI Records in the early 1970s.

The band became popular by singing folk music and singing new songs in the same vein. Although sounding like traditional English folk songs, some of their material was in fact composed by Jones, such as "The Ellan Vannin Tragedy" and "The Marco Polo". One of their best known songs, particularly in their native Liverpool, was "In My Liverpool Home", written by Peter McGovern in 1962. Cliff Hall also introduced traditional Jamaican songs to their repertoire. One of their albums was called Not Quite Folk.

They produced over 40 albums, and made numerous concerts and TV appearances. In 1965, after seeing the group perform in Liverpool, BBC producer Trevor Hill invited them to appear in a new BBC1 series titled Dance and Skylark, aboard an old sailing barque that was owned by presenter and bosun Stan Hugill. In 1970 they were given their own television show on BBC1, which ran for seven years. The Spinners Christmas Special attracted large audiences. They also had their own show on BBC Radio 2. They retired in 1988, after thirty years together, although they led the community singing at the 1989 FA Cup final and played some Christmas shows in the early 1990s. Mick Groves and Hughie Jones still occasionally performed, although Cliff Hall retired to Australia, where he died in 2008. Tony Davis returned to playing jazz after retiring from the group, and also hosted Tony's Tradtime on Jazz FM. He died in 2017.

The group's version of the Ewan MacColl song "Dirty Old Town" was included in Terence Davies's 2008 memoir/documentary of Liverpool, Of Time and the City. A biography of the group, Fried Bread and Brandy-O (the title of their signature tune), was written by Liverpool journalist David Stuckey (with a foreword by Pete Seeger and an introduction from Deryck Guyler) to coincide with their 25th anniversary. It was published by Robson Books.

In 2009, "The Liverpool Barrow Boys", from Songs Spun in Liverpool, was included in Topic Records 70-year anniversary boxed set Three Score and Ten as track 19 on the sixth CD.

The surviving members of the group, often with bass player/musical director John McCormick, continued playing at various venues such as Exeter, Buxton, London Olympia, Orpington and Liverpool as the "Spinners Legends". A plan to finish off with a two concert appearance at the Liverpool Philharmonic in spring 2020 was postponed due to the COVID-19 pandemic. But on 2 and 3 October 2021, after 63 years in showbusiness, the duo played their final concerts in the Music Room at Liverpool's Philharmonic Concert Hall.

== Band members ==
- Tony Davis (born Anthony John Davis, 1930-2017)
- Mick Groves (born Michael Groves, born 1936)
- Cliff Hall (born Clifford Samuel Hall, 1925-2008)
- Hughie Jones (born Hugh E. Jones, born 1936)
