= Central Village, Liverpool =

Abandoned development project in England

Central Village

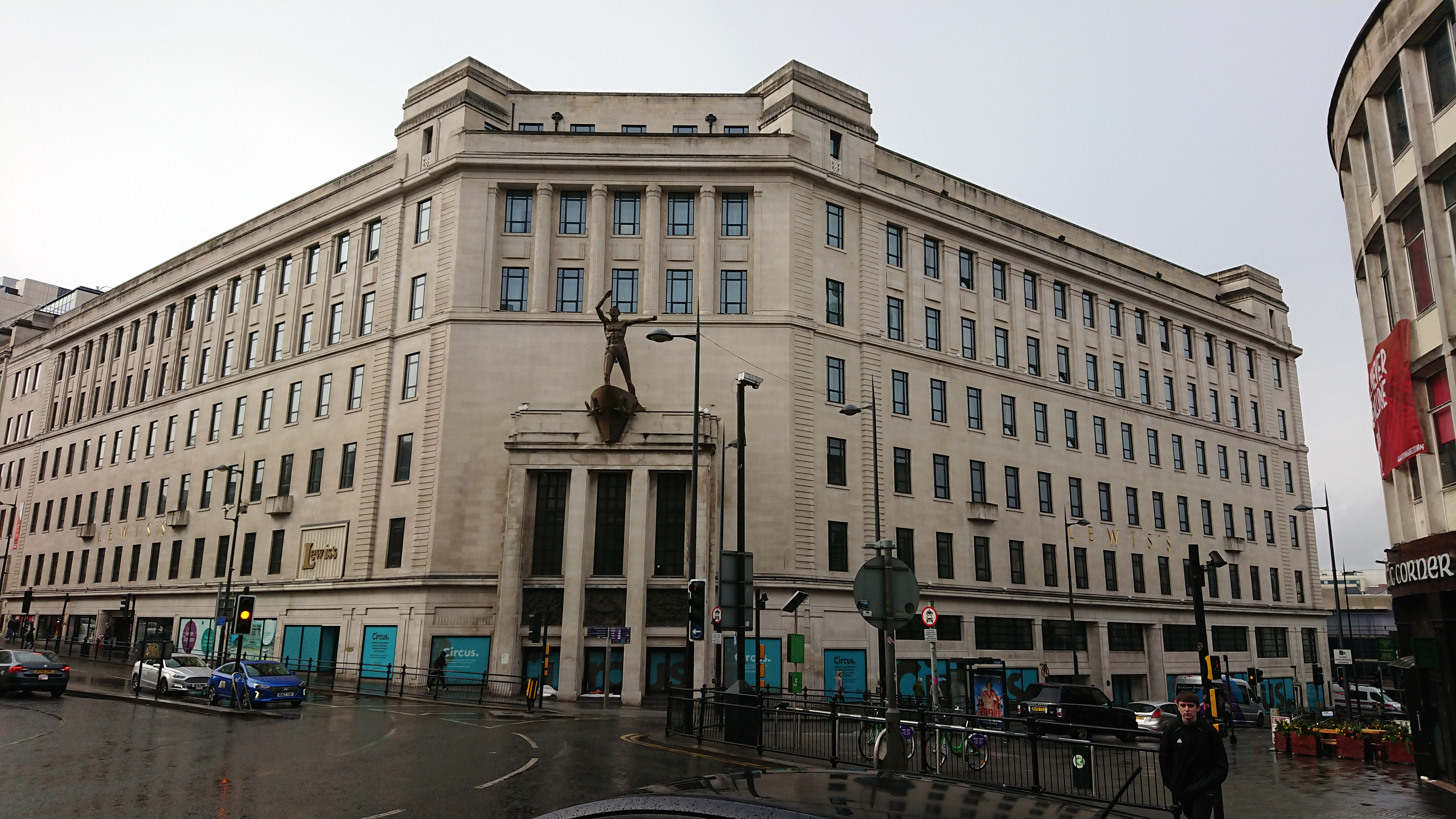
- The Lewis's building in 2019

Project
- Status: abandoned
- Developer: Merepark and Ballymore
- Architect: Woods Bagot
- Owner: Liverpool City Council
- Website: centralvillageliverpool.com

Location
- Location
- Coordinates: 53.405°N 2.979°W
- Country: England
- City: Liverpool

Central Village was a proposed shopping, leisure, commercial and residential development in Liverpool, England, United Kingdom. The complex was to cover the site of Liverpool Central railway station, and the former Lewis's department store. Planning permission was granted for the project by Liverpool City Council in May 2009, and final approval was given for construction of the entire complex to commence in February 2010. The project was never completed and the Lewis's building is now being used as offices, a hotel and a gym.

== Project timeline ==
- June 2006 - Planning permission is obtained for the development.
- October 2006 - The largely run-down site on which Central Village will be built is acquired by Merepark.
- October 2006 - In the same month as site acquisition, funding for the project is received.
- Early 2007 - Projected start date for construction, however some decisions were pending and more focus was given to the L1 development; it was delayed for a number of years.
- May 2008 - Permission is granted to build the Copthorne Hotel Liverpool within Central Village.
- October 2008 - Permission is granted to create the Millennium Hotel Liverpool in the former Watson building.
- November 2009 - To accompany the redevelopment of Central Station, money is pledged to improve and expand overall facilities within.
- February 2010 - Lewis's department store announces it will not renew the lease on the advice of Merepark.
- May 2010 - First contract awarded to McGee to design and build a £7 million 459-space car park which will become the first phase of construction in the summer of 2010.
- May 2010 - Lewis's closes its doors after 154 years of trading, after its parent Vergo Retail went into administration.
- March 2013 - Apart-hotel Adagio opens.
- 2023 - the Liverpool City Council sought tenders to redevelop Liverpool Central railway station, the site once earmarked for Central Village.

=== Liquidation ===
- June 2013 - Merepark Construction enters voluntary liquidation in June 2013 bringing development work to a halt.
- 2014 - Budget supermarket Lidl announce they plan to open a store in the Lewis's Building.
- January 2017 - Augur Liverpool take over the lease of part of the site.
- May 2017 - Lidl announce they have shelved their plans for a supermarket on the site.
- September 2017 - Augur announce plans to develop the Lewis's building into a shopping and leisure destination, to be called 'Circus'.
- May 2018 - Liverpool City Council announce plans to buy the shopping centre above Liverpool Central Railway Station and simultaneously lease it back to Augur.
- September 2018 - Augur complete the work to convert the remainder of the Lewis's building into offices in a development known as 'The Department'.

== Completed work ==
The 39,000 m^{2} (420,000 sq ft) nine-storey Lewis's building, which was Liverpool's most famous store for 154 years, closed its doors for the last time on 29 May 2010 to be redeveloped as part of the Central Village project. In 2013, an apart hotel, Adagio opened in the former Lewis's building in the side facing Ranelagh Street. In 2015, rest of the building was opened as office and retail space, called The Department.

== See also ==
- Lewis's
- Liverpool One
