= Gerald de Courcy Fraser =

English architect (1873–1952)

- Born: 25 November 1873; Bradford, Yorkshire, England
- Died: 23 November 1952 (aged 78); Formby, Lancashire, England
- Occupation: Architect
- Awards: FRIBA
- Practice: Fraser, Sons and Geary
- Design: Neoclassical, Art Deco

Gerald de Courcy Fraser FRIBA (25 November 1873 – 23 November 1952) was an architect who worked mostly in Liverpool and Birmingham. He was the company architect for Lewis's and built large department stores in a neo-classical and art deco style across the North of England in the first half of the 20^{th} century. He has been described as 'Liverpool's leading commercial architect in the interwar years' and two of his buildings, in Glasgow and Liverpool, have been designated as listed buildings for their architectural and historic interest.

== Biography ==
Gerald de Courcy Fraser was born in Bradford, Yorkshire in 1873. His parents were Robert Fraser and Barbara Ellenor Atkin Fraser. He was brought up in Hightown, north of Crosby. In 1905 Fraser married Sibyl Constance Graham in Lancashire with whom he had 7 children. They lived at Warren Mount in Freshfield, Formby, Lancashire. Fraser was a keen entomologist.

== Career as an architect ==
Fraser was articled to Walter William Thomas of Liverpool by 1891. On Thomas's retiral, Fraser took over the Liverpool practice and by 1905 it was in his own name. His offices were at 26 North John Street, Liverpool and by 1924 at 27 Dale Street, Liverpool. Fraser's work was mostly commercial buildings: department stores, warehouses, cinemas and offices for companies in the North of England. In 1910 he designed the new Dental School and Hospital in Liverpool, and in 1911 he built a Liverpool University settlement house with funds raised by Frederick Marquis, later Lord Woolton. In 1912 he started work on several shops on Church Street that transformed Liverpool city centre with 'convenient, handsome and up-to-date "stores" at which the shopper can buy almost anything': Boots (now the Premier Building), Bon Marché, William Henderson & Sons, and Cooper & Co.

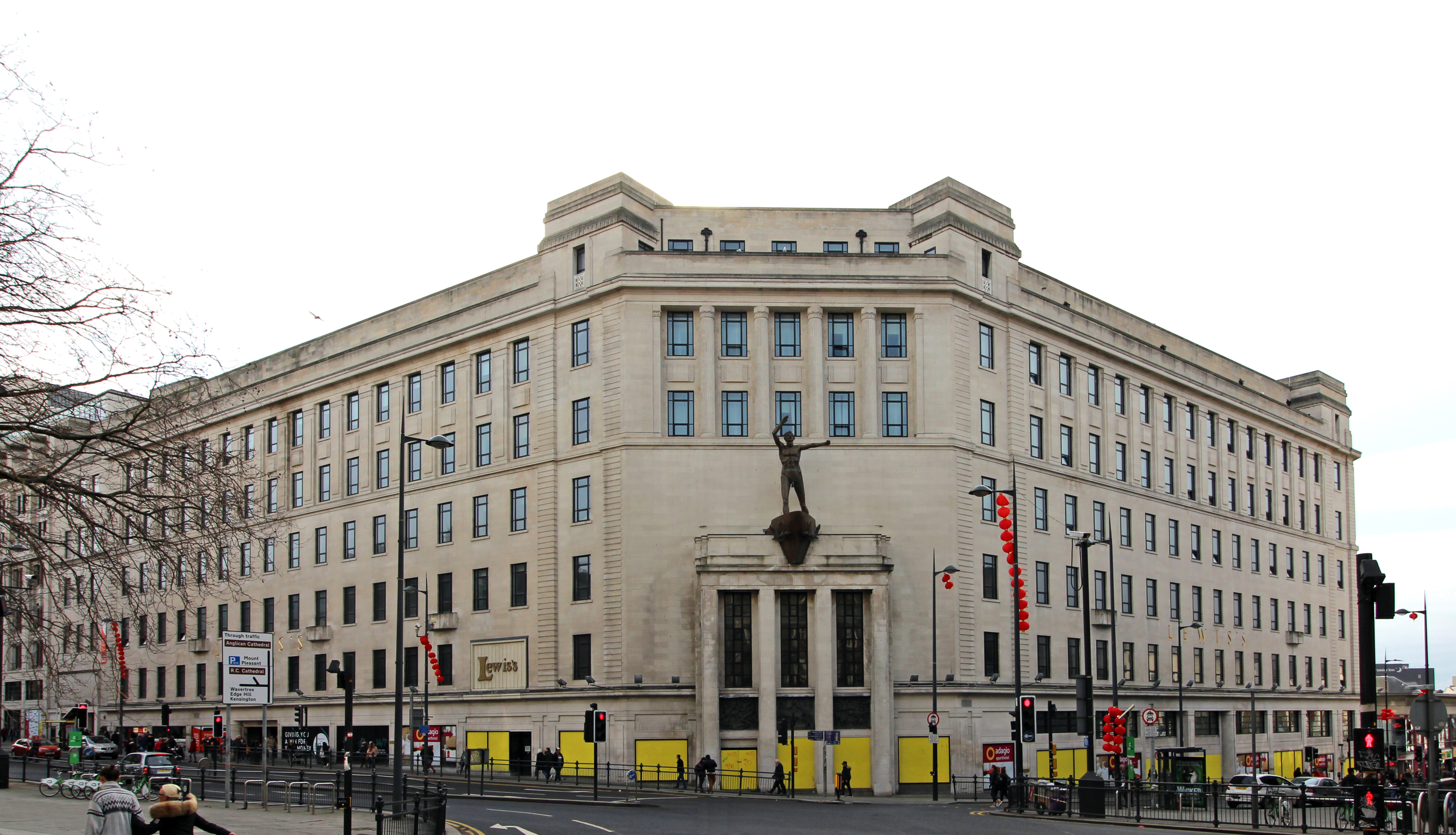
Lewis's department store, completed 1956, corner of Ranelagh Street and Renshaw Street, Liverpool

Most of Fraser's work was as the company architect for Lewis's department stores in Liverpool. He began redesigning the original shop on Renshaw Street, expanding it towards Ranelagh Street between 1910–1923 and remodelling it in 1931–32. However, he had to completely rebuild the flagship store after it was destroyed during the Liverpool Blitz in 1941. When Lord Woolton announced the reconstruction, the Liverpool Echo noted that Fraser's 'long process of reconstruction of Lewis's buildings' had 'led to the popular rumour that the directors of Lewis's had an arrangement whereby building shold never cease or Lewis's luck would cease.' Throughout the 1920-30s Fraser built Lewis's department stores in Birmingham, Glasgow and Leicester and was involved in the large civil engineering projects of Lewis's stores designed by local architects in Manchester, Leeds, Hanley and Bristol.

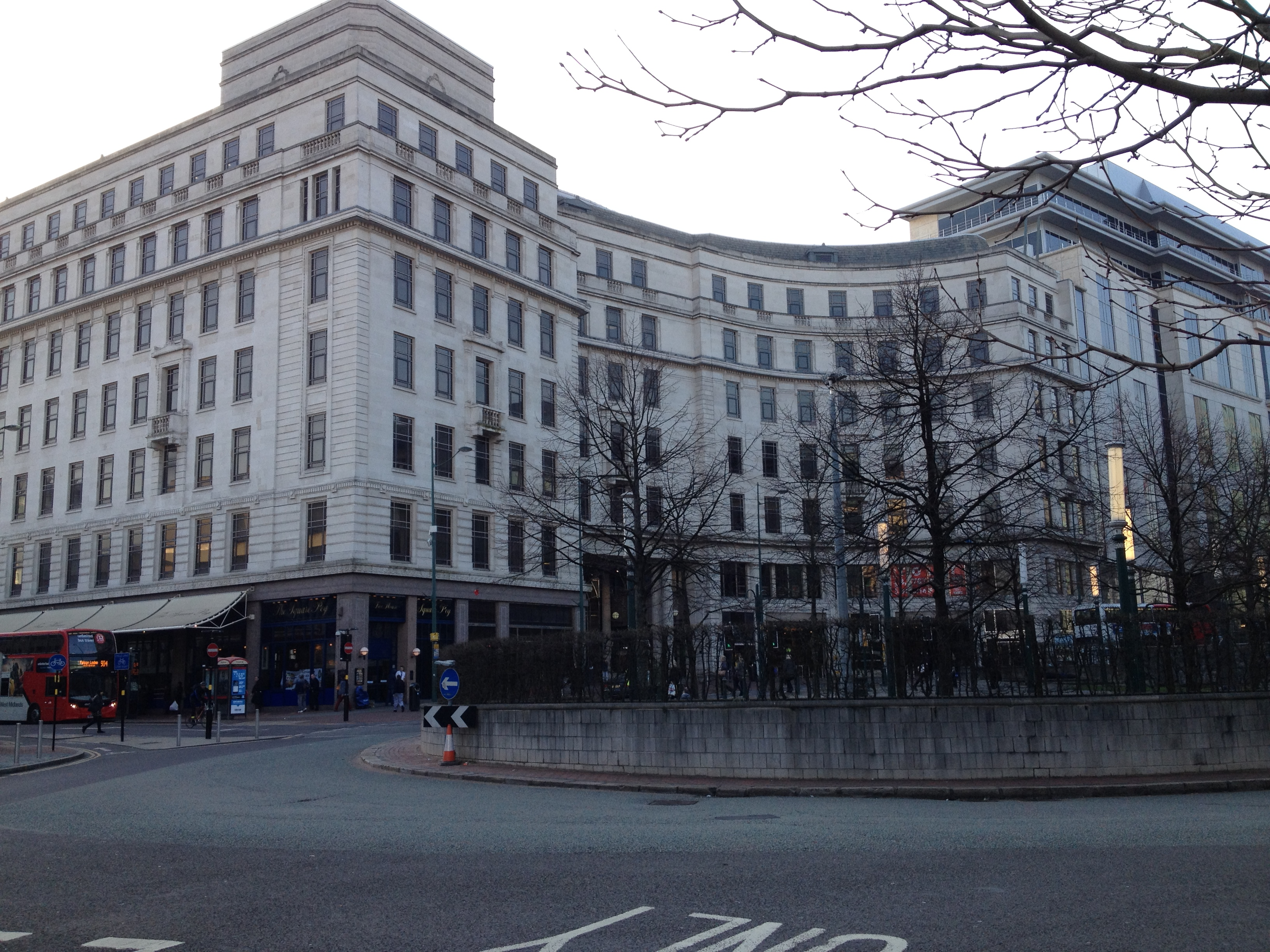
Former Lewis's, Old Square, Birmingham, completed 1928

Fraser's landmark buildings are in a classical or art deco style, often made of white Portland stone on a steel frame, with metal framed windows. Inside the department stores were restaurants, food halls, floors of clothes, haberdashery, gardening and kitchen equipment, even pets, and fondly remembered Christmas grottos. Lewis's in Leicester was partly inspired by the Queen Mary liner, with nautical art deco detailing, but all that remains is its unusual rhomboid tower topped by an observation deck. Fraser also designed department stores for Beatties in Wolverhampton, and Owen Owen in Coventry, the latter of which was destroyed in the worst night of the Coventry blitz just 3 years after opening.

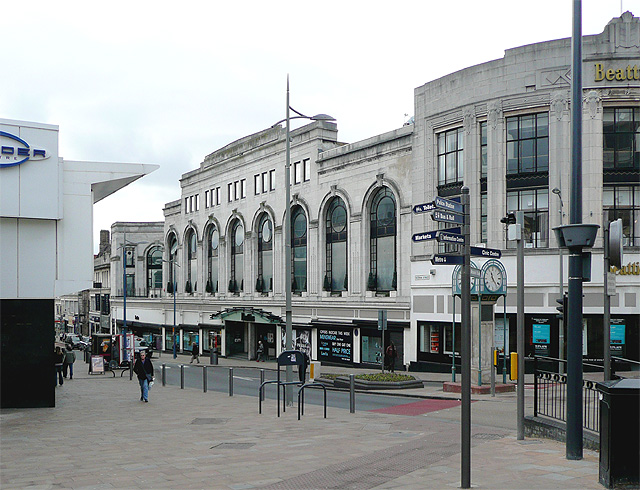
Former Beatties, Victoria Street, Wolverhampton, completed 1929

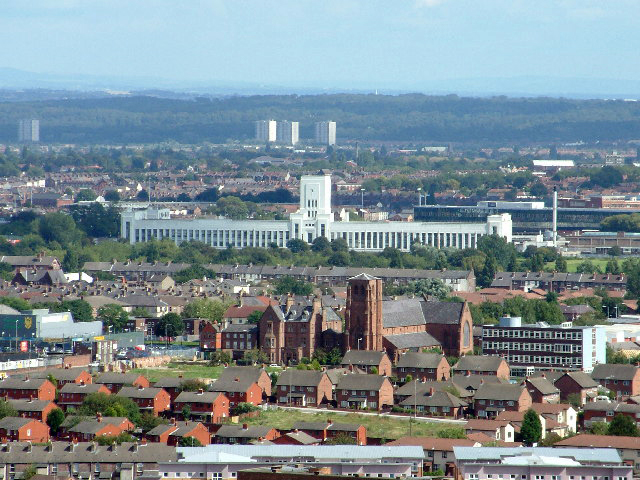
Littlewoods Pools Building, Edge Lane, Liverpool, completed 1938

Fraser also designed hotels, cinemas, housing schemes and Litherland Town Hall. His most dramatic art deco building is the Littlewoods Pools Building: two long, white buildings of 26 bays with double height windows, a fluted frieze and massive central clock tower.

Fraser was in partnership with architect Cyril Eyres Ainly (5 July 1881–1965) after World War I until 1924. In 1936 he quarrelled with David Lumsden, who claimed they were in a practice of architects and surveyors called ‘G de C Fraser and Lumsden’, at Temple Row, Birmingham, from 1924 to 1935. His own practice, Fraser, Sons and Gearey, was often named as building contractors on projects like the Lewis's stores in Liverpool.

== Notable works ==
Among his buildings are:

- Lewis's, Renshaw Street, Liverpool (1910–23), possible extension and remodelling 1931–32, destroyed by bombing May 1941 and rebuilt 1948–56. Grade II Listed
- Dental School and Hospital, Pembroke Place, Liverpool (1910), demolished 1969
- Liverpool University Settlement House, 12-14 Nile Street, Liverpool (1911–1912)
- Boots (Premier Building), Church Street, Liverpool (1912–1914)
- Bon Marché, Basnett Street, Liverpool (1912–1918)
- Willam Henderson & Sons, Church Street, Liverpool (1915)
- Cooper's, Church Street, Liverpool (1915)
- Corona Cinema, Crosby (1914–1920)
- Beresford Cinema, Park Road, Liverpool (1922)
- Casino Cinema, Prescot Road, Liverpool (1923)
- Lewis's, Old Square, Birmingham (1924–25, addition of bridges across Minories 1928)
- 66-69 New Street, Birmingham (1929)
- Beatties, Victoria Street, Wolverhampton (1929)
- Tea Factory warehouse, Wood Street, Liverpool (c.1930)
- Lewis's, Argyle Street, Glasgow (1932–1949) with Clarke, Bell and J. H. Craigie. Grade B Listed
- Lewis's, Humberstone Gate, Leicester (1935–6), demolished 1995 apart from tower
- Owen Owen, Trinity Street, Coventry (1936-37), destroyed by bombing 14 November 1940
- 41 Bull Street, Birmingham (1936–37)
- Littlewoods Pools Building, Edge Lane, Liverpool (1938)
- Litherland Town Hall, Hatton Hill Road, Litherland, Merseyside (1940)

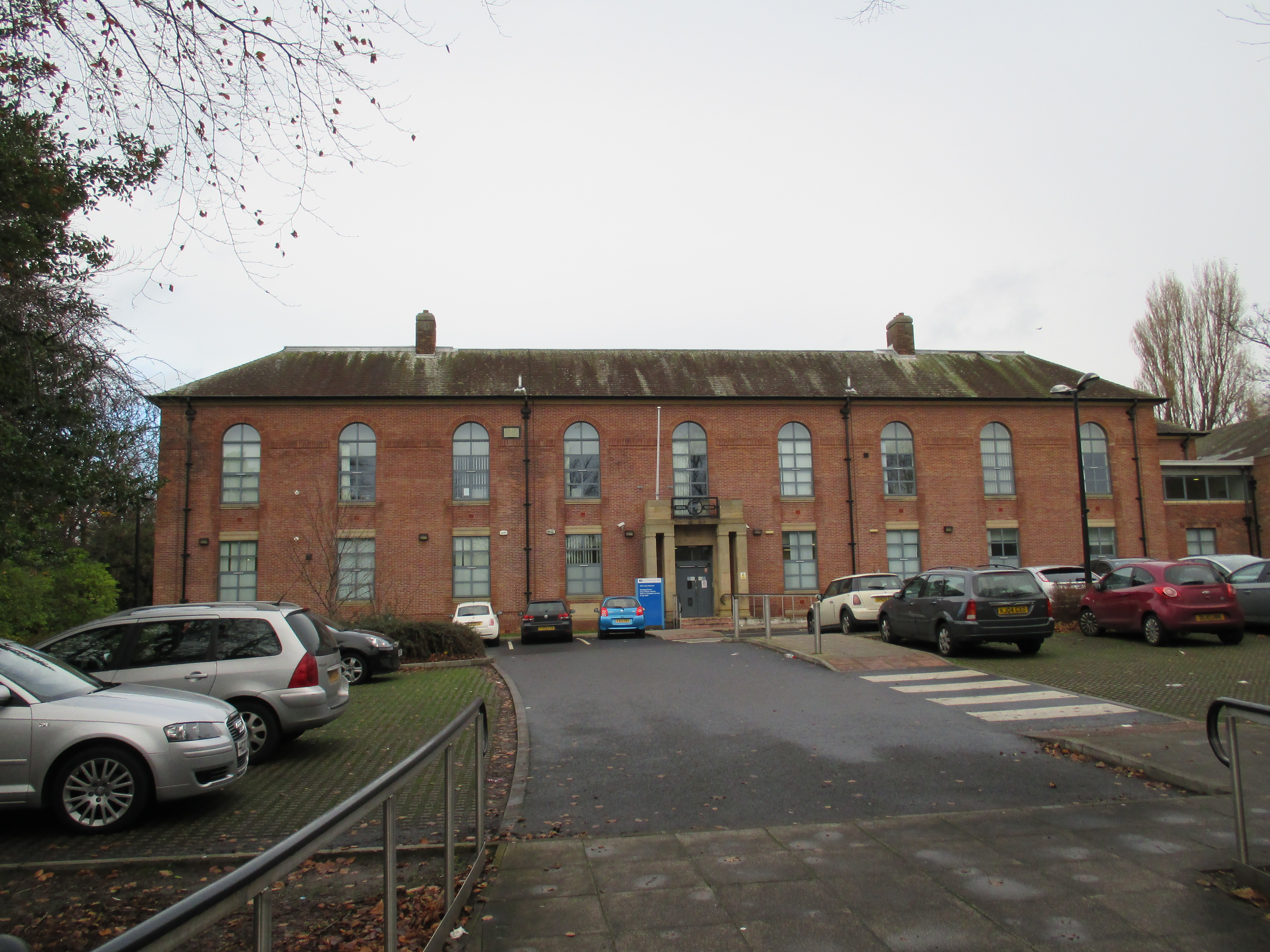
Litherland Town Hall, Hatton Hill Road, Litherland, Merseyside, completed 1940.

== Later years and death ==
From June 1931, Fraser enthusiastically re-engaged with his childhood hobby of entomology. Accompanied by his wife Sibyl, he would stride around the Formby area in his deer-stalker hat, corduroy ‘bags’ and cigarette holder clamped between his teeth. During night-time walks by the light of a petrol lamp, they would walk down Victoria Road to the sea through the sand dunes, looking for lepidoptera and coleoptera to add to his collection. The Frasers owned a small cottage in Conwy near Loggerheads Country Park, where they held entomological meetings and bughunting expeditions. In 1946 they founded The Raven Society, an Entomological and Natural History Society.

He died on 23 November 1952 in a nursing home in Formby, Lancashire. Just a few weeks before, he had been invited as Guest of Honour by the South London Entomological Society. After his death, his collection was dispersed to his friends, with a small cabinet of Formby moths to the Liverpool Museum. His eldest son Michael Graham Fraser (born 1914) was also an architect, and with his brother-in-law Keith Warren Gearey, continued the family firm Fraser, Son and Gearey, until 1967.

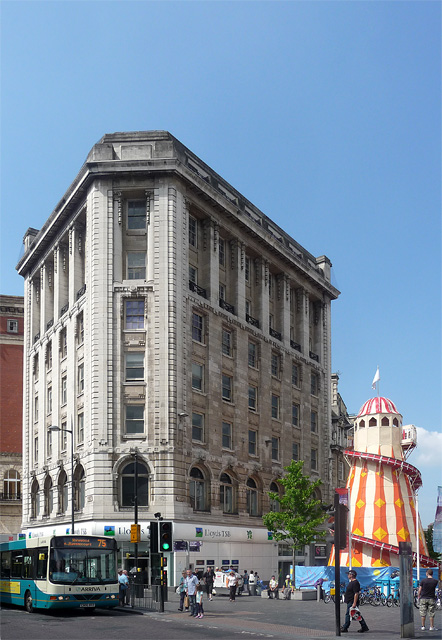
Premier Building, Church Street, Liverpool, 1912-1914

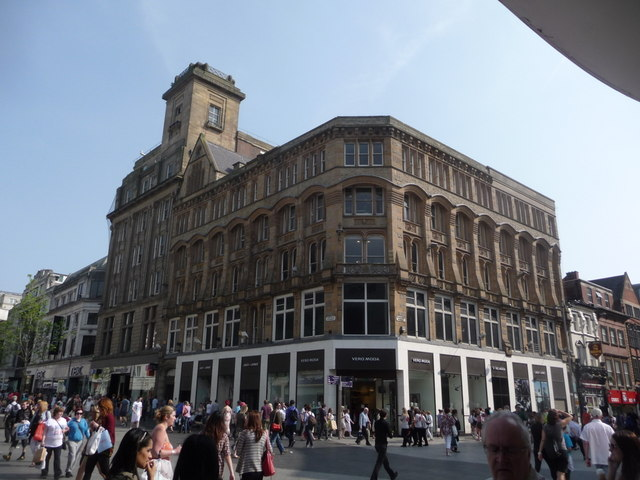
Cooper's Buildings, Church Street, Liverpool, completed 1915 (building with tower to left)

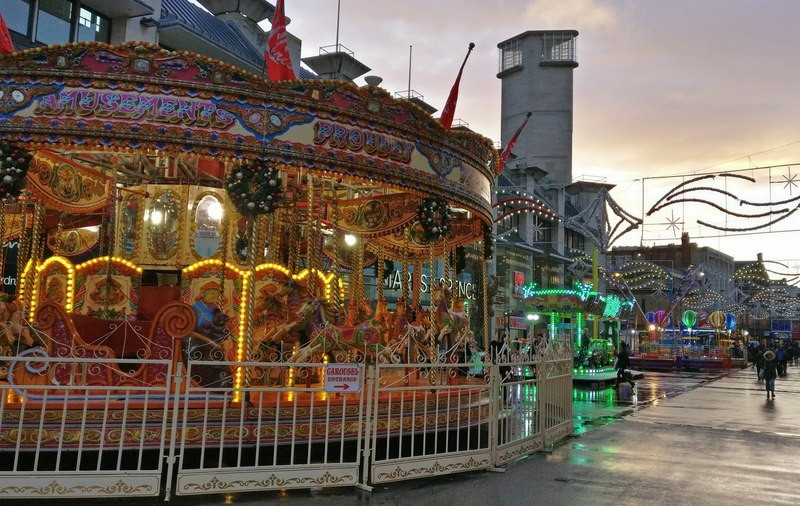
Tower of former Lewis's, Humberstone Gate, Leicester, completed 1936, demolished 1995 apart from tower to right.

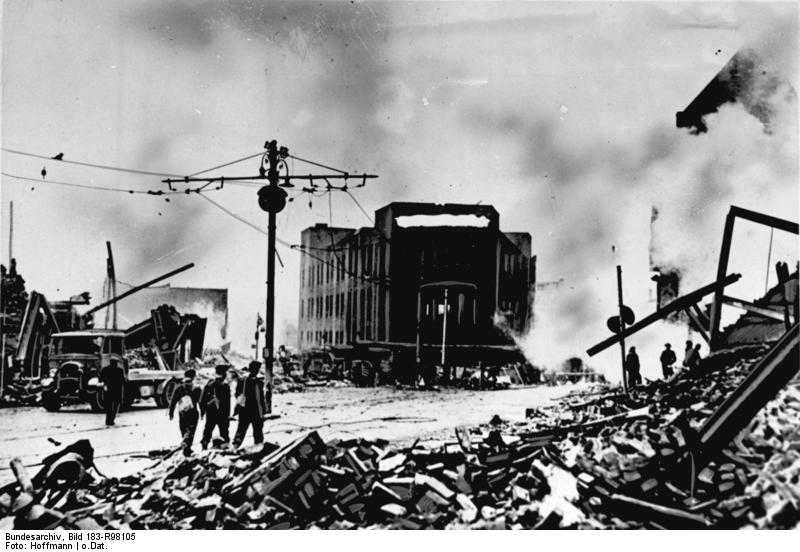
The remains of Owen Owen, Trinity Street Coventry, completed 1936, destroyed by bombing November 1940

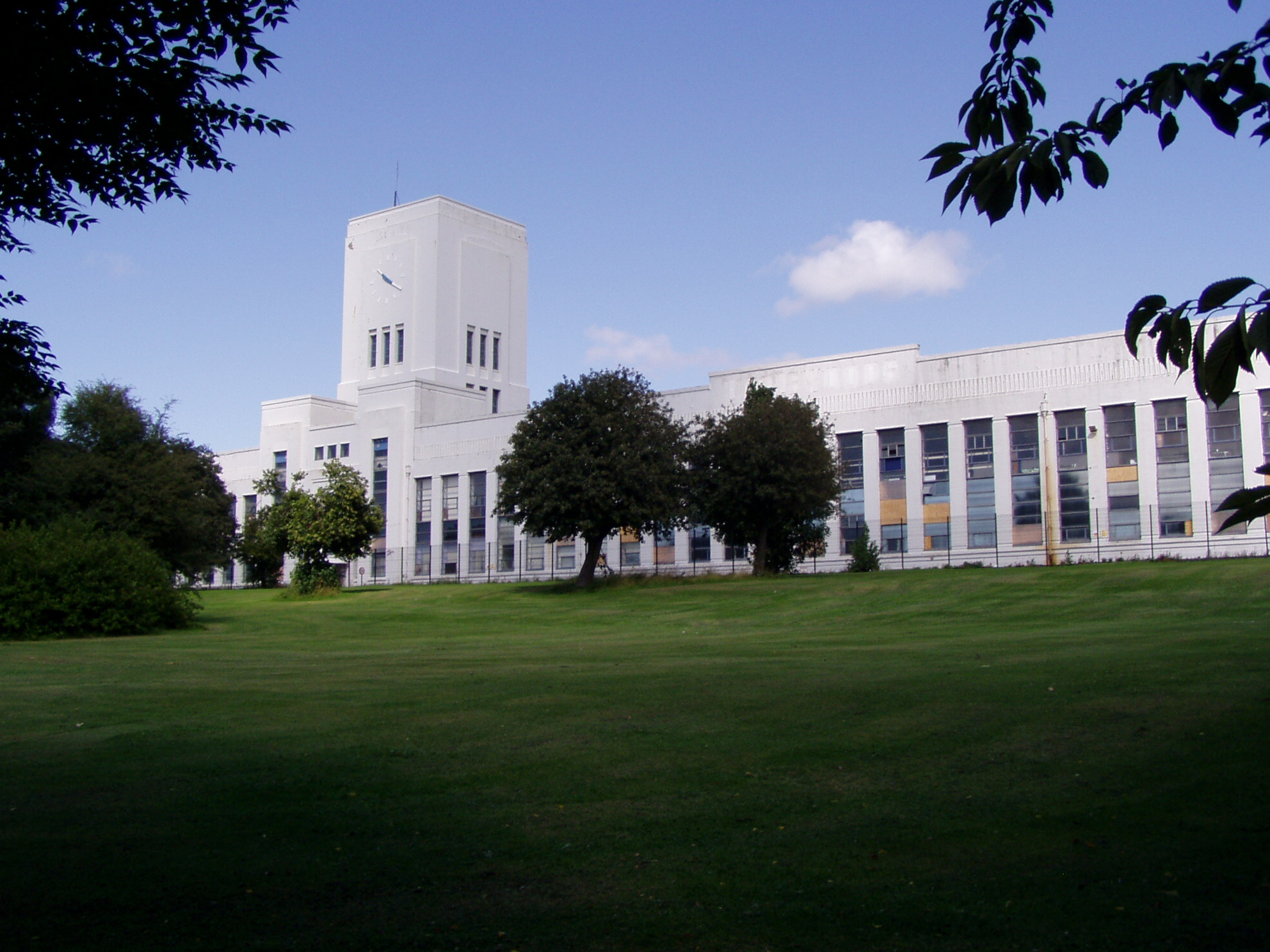
Littlewoods Pools Building, Edge Lane, Liverpool, 1938

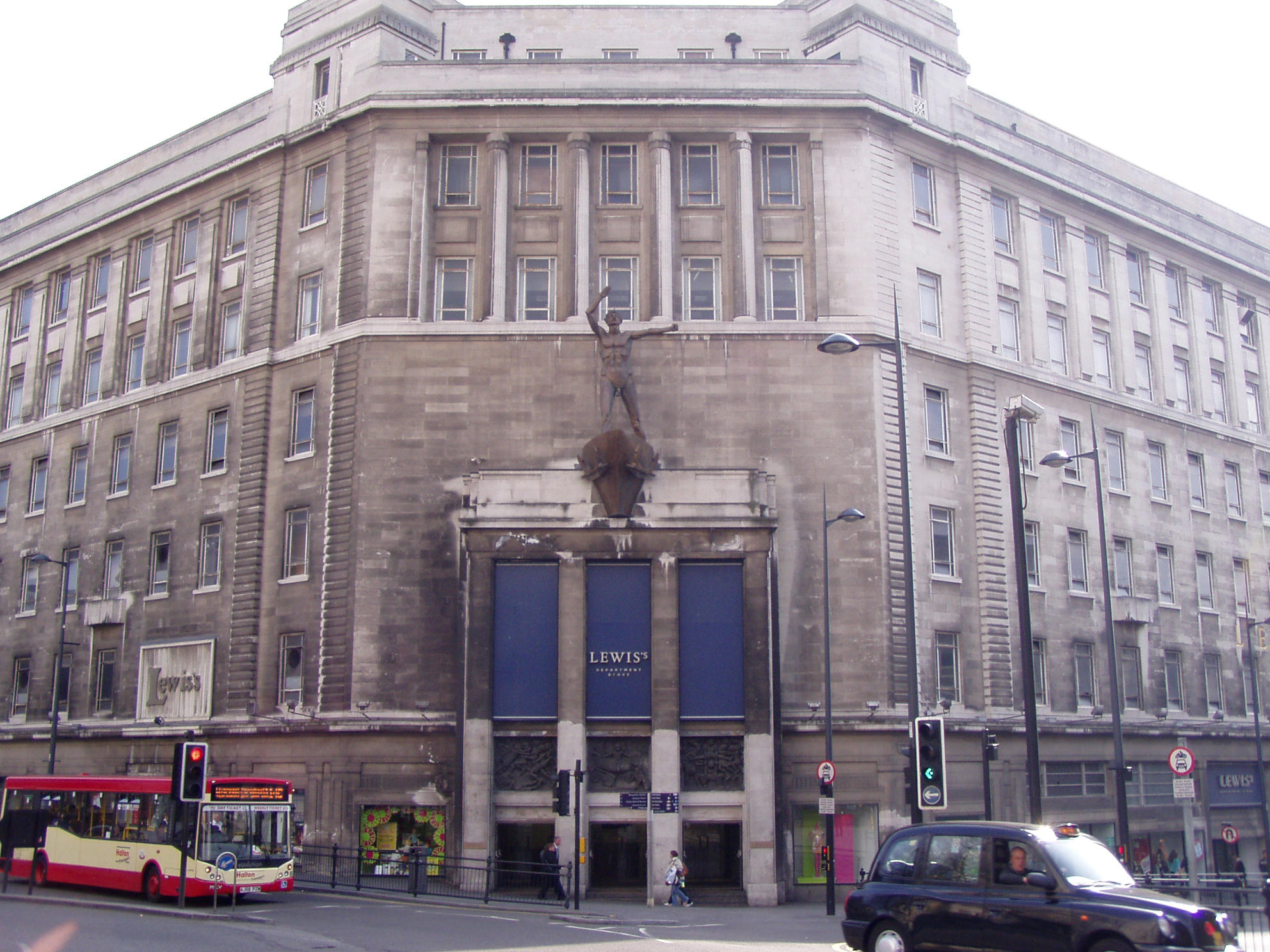
Former Lewis's, Renshaw Street, Liverpool, completed 1956

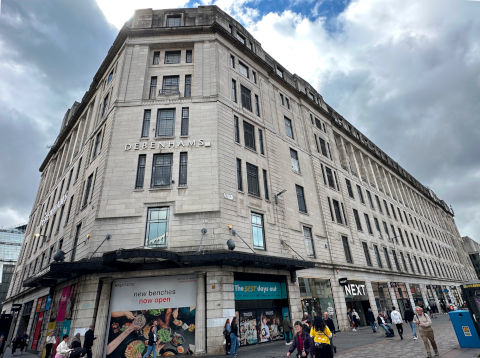
Former Lewis's department store, Argyle Street, Glasgow, completed 1949
