= Peter McGovern =

English songwriter and activist

Peter John McGovern (28 October 1927 – 1 April 2006) was an English songwriter and activist.

== Life and career ==
Pete McGovern was born in Liverpool, England, on 28 October 1927. Both of his parents were Irish. His father, Thomas McGovern, was from Collon, County Louth, Ireland and his mother, Annie Dillon, was from Galbally, County Limerick. Pete was born in Regent Street, off the dock road north of the city centre.

McGovern attended St. Edward's School, West Derby and Queen Elizabeth's School, Anfield. He worked for many years on the railways as a telecoms technician and was an active trade unionist and campaigner.

His main claim to fame is that he wrote "In My Liverpool Home", a song that has become an anthem or folk tune for the people of Liverpool. It was recorded by the folk group The Spinners.

The original version of "In My Liverpool Home" was written by McGovern in the early 1960s, but many verses have been added since.

== Death ==
McGovern died in Trawsfynydd, North Wales, on 1 April 2006. He died in his sleep having watched Liverpool beat Manchester United on Match of The Day: "McGovern had had a perfect day at his holiday home in North Wales. He had seen Liverpool win, and he was delighted that Robbie Fowler had scored, as he had written a song for Fowler's wedding. He drank a couple of glasses of Guinness, completed the crossword and went to bed. He died in his sleep."

== Family ==
McGovern's granddaughter, Alison McGovern, was elected MP for Wirral South in the 2010 general election.
