= Baltic Triangle =

Creative, leisure and nightlife district of Liverpool, England

Coordinates: 53.395831°N 2.979119°W

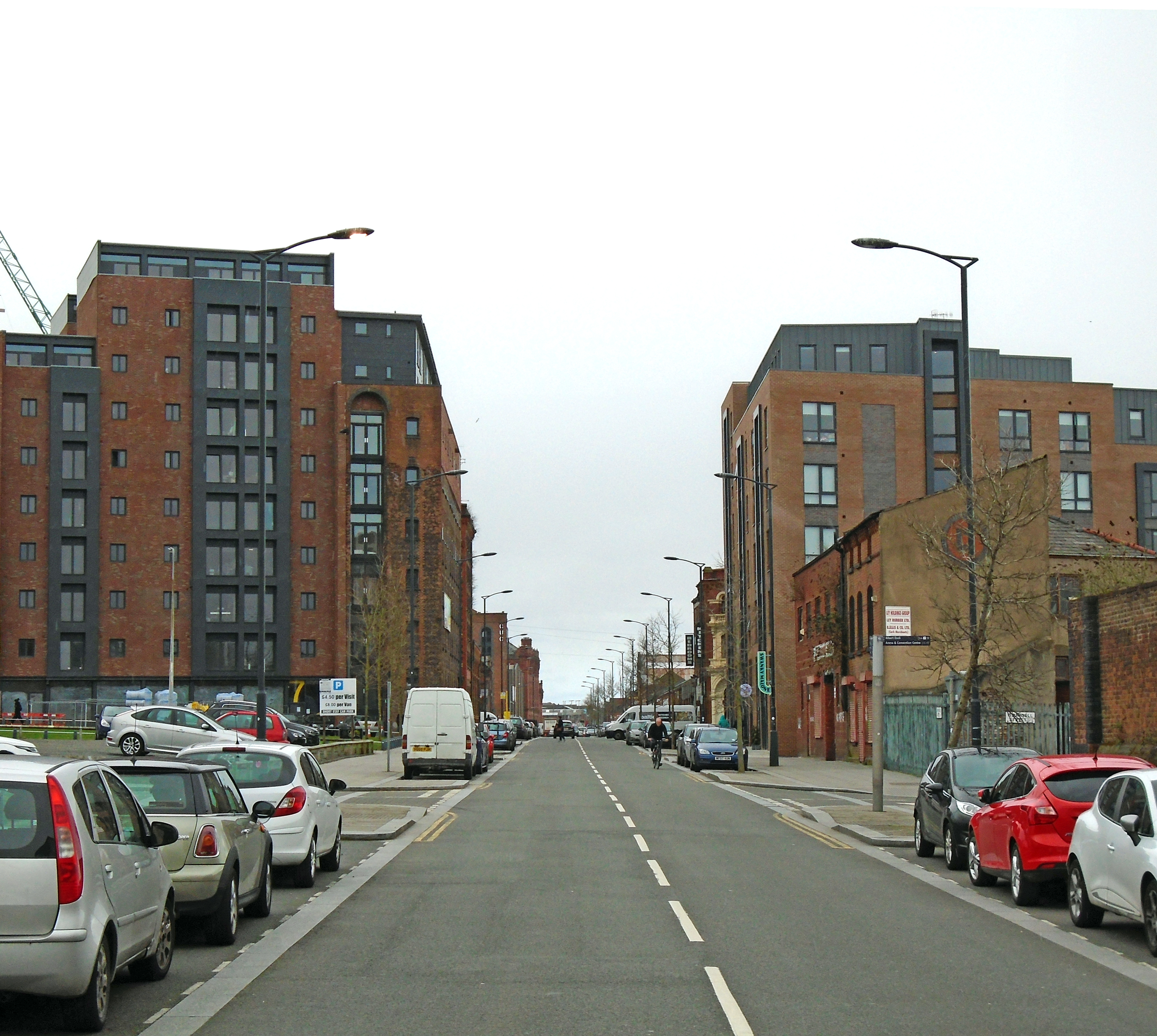
- View up Jamaica Street in the Baltic Triangle

- Location within Merseyside
- Metropolitan borough: Liverpool
- Metropolitan county: Merseyside
- Region: North West
- Country: England
- Sovereign state: United Kingdom
- Post town: LIVERPOOL
- Postcode district: L1, plus a small part of L8
- Dialling code: 0151
- Police: Merseyside
- Fire: Merseyside
- Ambulance: North West
- UK Parliament: Liverpool Riverside

The Baltic Triangle is an area of Liverpool city centre defined by Liverpool City Council as the triangular portion of the city bounded by Liver Street, Park Lane, St James Street, Hill Street, Sefton Street and Wapping.

In 2020, the area was home to over 500 businesses employing more than 3,000 people, hundreds of which are in the creative and digital sectors. The district has been nationally and internationally recognised for its bohemian character which includes independent markets, beer gardens, music venues, art spaces, workshops and design studios which coexist alongside tech businesses and new housing developments for students and young professionals.

== History ==
=== 19th century ===
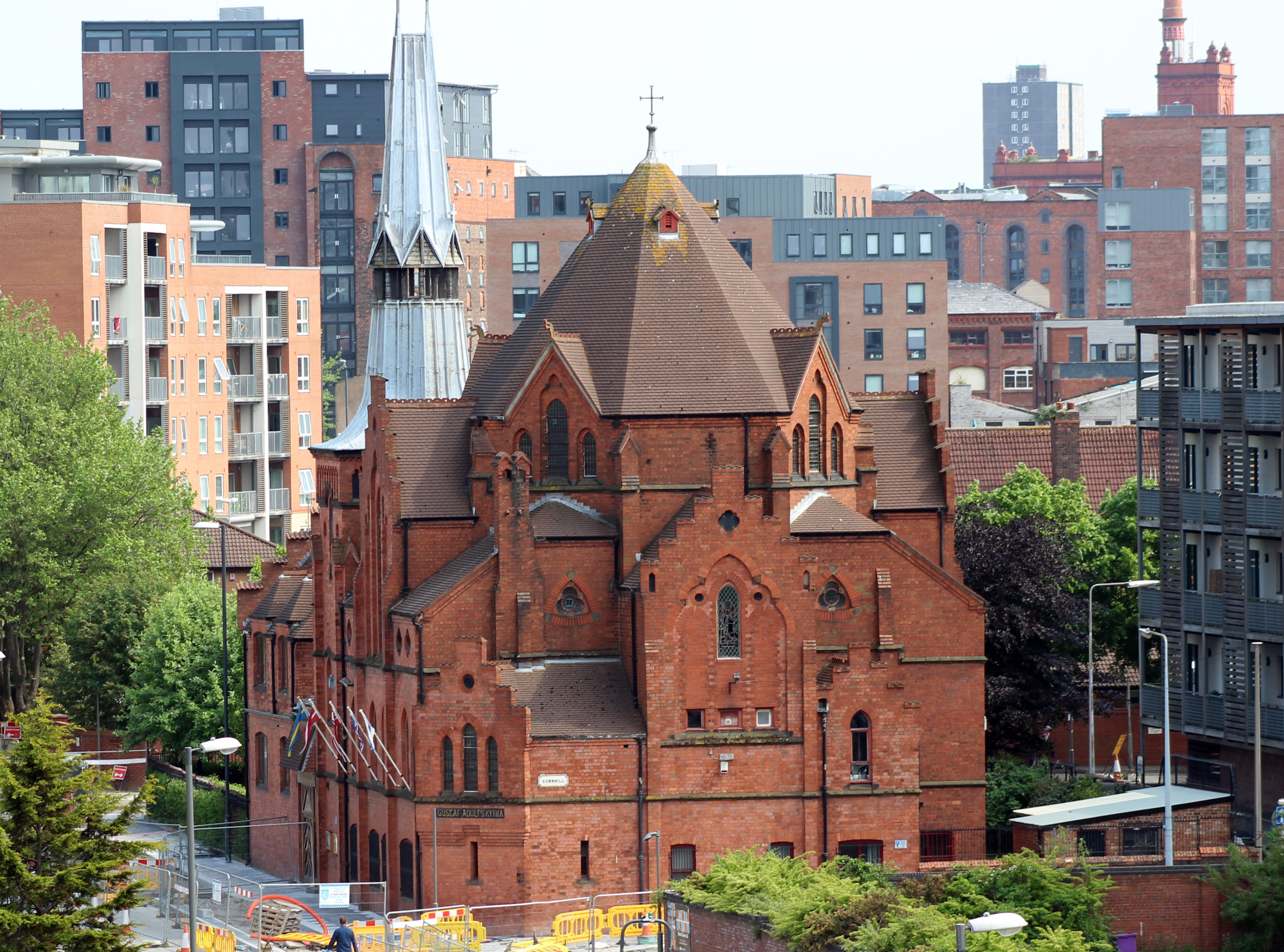
Gustav Adolf Church

At the height of Liverpool's importance as a major port in the 19th century, the area was home to timber yards and warehouses that stored wood imported from places such as Norway which was needed for major building projects around the UK. As many as 50,000 people from Sweden, Norway and nations on the Baltic Sea were passing through the city each year. Many sailors and merchants had international dealings in the timber trade, whilst many people were passing through Liverpool's port with plans to emigrate to places such as the United States. As a result of this influx and so many spending time in the city, a Scandinavian community formed in the area now known as the Baltic Triangle. Evidence of this period survives today in the Grade II* Gustav Adolf Scandinavian church and the Grade II Baltic Fleet pub, which still stand.

Other suggestions include that the area was once home to a small but lucrative whaling industry and is named after the fishing grounds. Greenland Street, for example, was named after the fishing grounds.

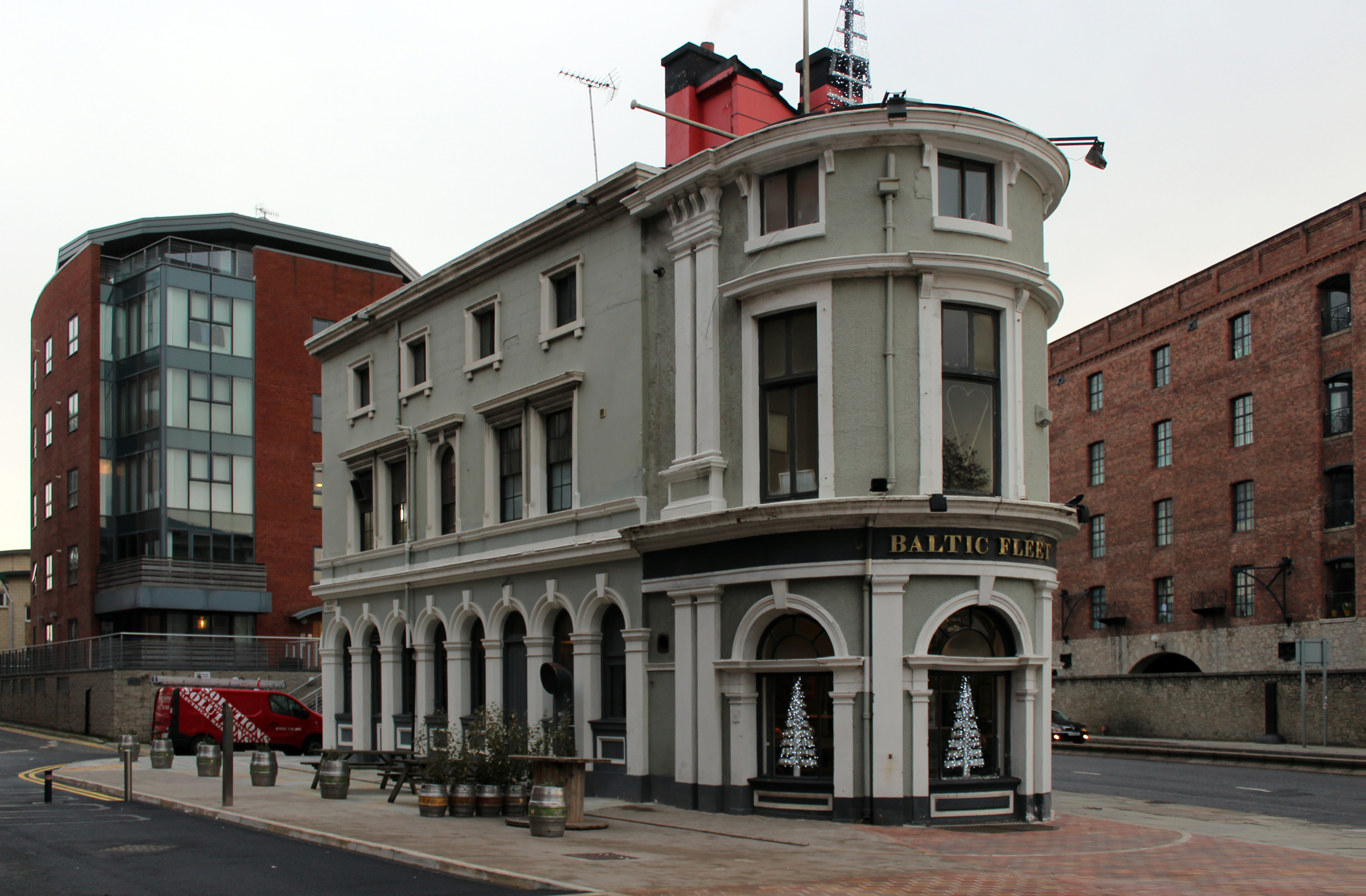
The Baltic Fleet public house, dating from the neighbourhood's Scandinavian past, still survives today

=== 20th century ===
During the Second World War, the area was heavily bombed and few of the original industrial buildings survived. A programme of post-war re-building took place which included a number of light industrial units.

=== 21st century ===
The area fell in to decline which persisted in to the mid 2000s. During its decline, the area was seen as 'forgotten', its buildings lay empty, abandoned and disused and for a period of time its poorly lit streets operated as a red-light district. In 2004, Liverpool City Council campaigned for the area based on Kempston Street and Jamaica Street to become one of the UK's first official managed zones for working prostitutes, where prostitution would be officially tolerated. However, the idea received little support from the UK central government.

=== Creative district ===
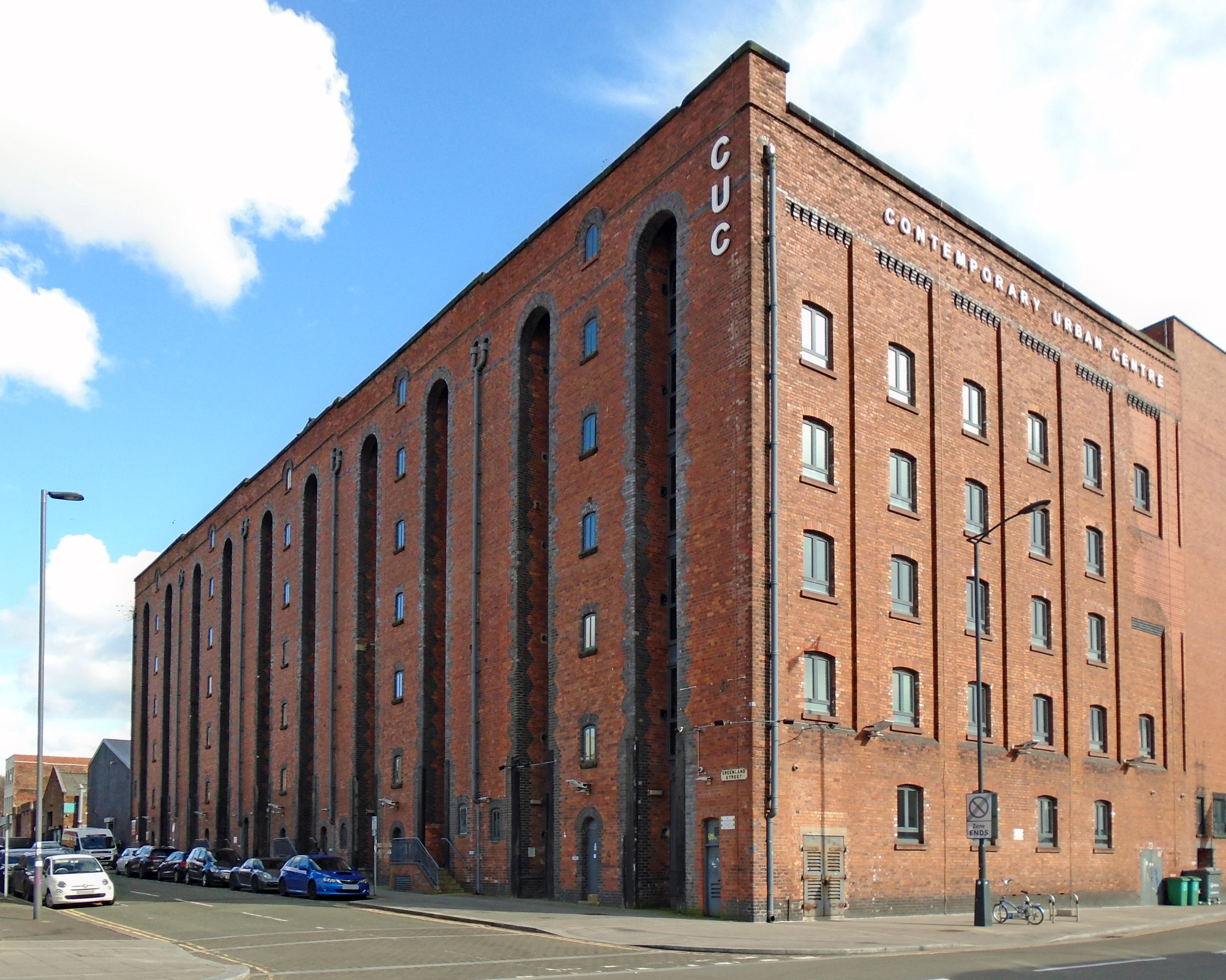
Large warehouse on corner of Jamaica Street and Greenland Street which now houses Elevator Studios

From the mid 2000s, the Baltic Triangle has attracted a wide variety of creative and digital businesses, musicians, artists, photographers, fashion designers, recording studios, architects and film makers.

Shortly after the City Council plan for a managed zone for sex workers failed to garner central government support, the focus of the Baltic Triangle began to shift. Amongst the dereliction and decaying architecture, a series of underground music gigs were taking place in some of the underused buildings. Low rents associated with rundown spaces, which were off the beaten track, provided an impetus for artists and creatives to utilise neglected warehouses. Events linked to the 2006, 2008 and 2010 Liverpool Biennials provided a catalyst for the area's renaissance as a creative district.

Jayne Casey, known locally from the city's 1970s music scene, led the campaign to bring culture in to the area, which ultimately led to the foundation of the Baltic Creative. The group was set up as a not-for-profit Community interest company to protect the interests of creative and digital businesses. Casey and her colleagues argued that once property developers saw the Baltic Triangle as an up-and-coming area, creative companies and artists run the risk of being forced out by gentrification and profit-driven developers. Baltic Creative was established in 2009 to ensure that creative businesses were able to own the property they were regenerating, thus preventing them from being displaced later by property developers. With the help of public funding and several grants, the Baltic Creative purchased and refurbished 18 warehouses and sheds in the area, and converted them into office space for creative and digital businesses. The initiative led to the opening of dozens of businesses and employment for hundreds of people.

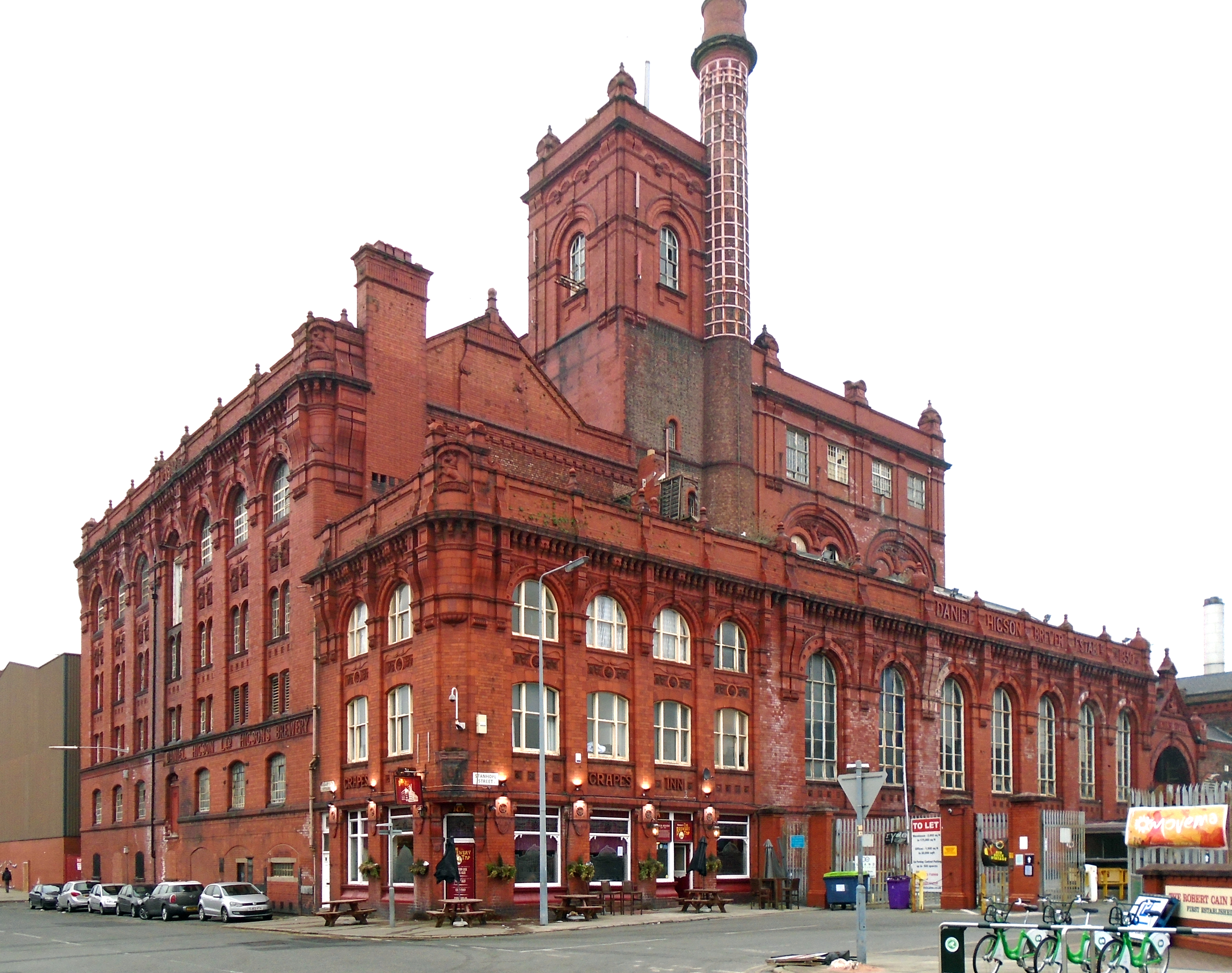
Cains Brewery Village opened in 2015 and houses workspaces, markets, food and drink venues

Elevator Studios opened in the neighbourhood in 2007 as a hub for music production, art, tech, games and marketing companies. Camp and Furnace opened in 2012 as a food and events space. 24 Kitchen Street followed in 2013 as a mixed-use event space for underground music. Cains Brewery Village opened in 2015 as a leisure destination and in 2022, Boxpark announced that they would open their first venture outside of London in the Baltic Triangle.

By 2020, more than 500 businesses were based in the Baltic Triangle employing some 3,000 people across creative and digital industries, bars, cafes, restaurants and nightclubs.

=== Regeneration initiatives ===
Liverpool City Council unveiled plans in March 2018 to extend the boundary of the Baltic Triangle to include the Dock Road, Sefton Street and Brunswick Station. The move was designed to stop an increase in the number of housing developments and protect space for businesses. The idea did not go ahead, however, in 2020, the City Council formulated a Supplementary Planning Document to guide future development proposals, planning applications and regeneration in the locality for the following 20 years. The document came in to force in 2021 and envisages the district as a bohemian base for an independent community of digital and creative businesses, which will be complemented by a growing residential community.

== List of notable landmarks ==
- Boxpark Liverpool
- Cains Brewery Village
- Church of St Vincent de Paul, Liverpool
- Gustav Adolf Church, Liverpool
- Heap's Rice Mill
- Jacaranda Baltic
- Liverpool Baltic railway station (proposed)
- The Studio School Liverpool
- Wapping Tunnel

== Transport ==
The neighbourhood sits between Liverpool Central and Brunswick railway stations on Merseyrail's Northern Line.

Until its closure in 1917, the area was served by Liverpool St James railway station. With the resurgence of the Baltic Triangle in the early 2010s, interest grew in reopening the station. Liverpool City Region Combined Authority announced in August 2019 that they were planning to use part of a £172 million funding package for reopening the station, subject to the plans being approved. The new station will be known as 'Liverpool Baltic Station', with an estimated opening date in 2028.
