= The Jacaranda =

Music venue in Liverpool, England

Coordinates: 53.4027466°N 2.9791556°W

- The Jac
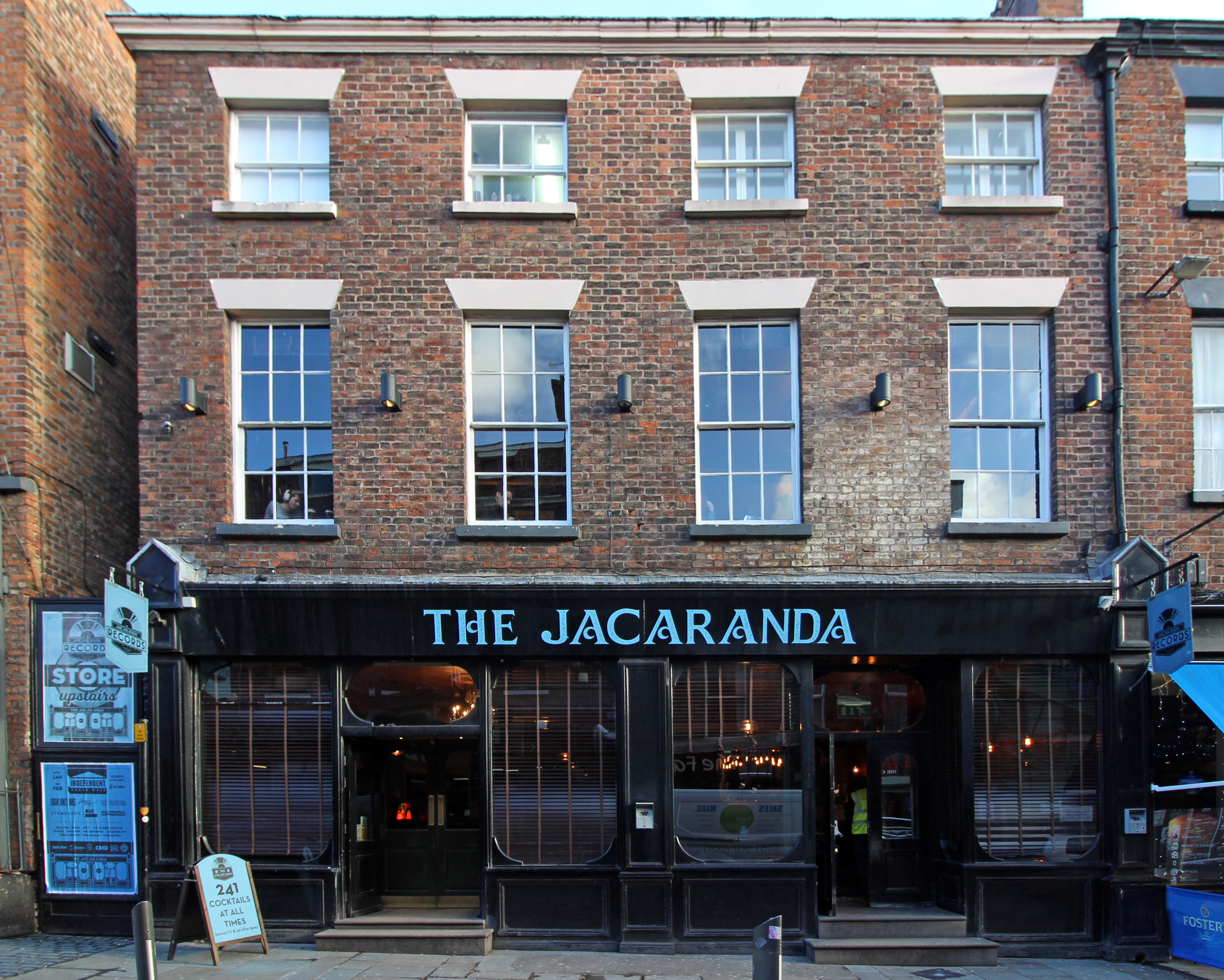
- Interactive map of The Jacaranda
- Former names: The Jacaranda Club
- Location: 21-23 Slater Street; Liverpool L1 4BW; England, United Kingdom
- Owner: Graham Stanley; Catherine Nixon
- Type: Music venue, bar & record shop

Construction
- Opened: 1958

Tenants
- Jacaranda Records 2015–present

Website
- www.jacarandarecords.com/thejacclub/

The Jacaranda, also known historically as the Jacaranda Club or affectionately The Jac, is a renowned music venue in Liverpool, closely associated with the rise of the Merseybeat phenomenon in the 1960s. Opened by The Beatles' first manager, Allan Williams, in 1958, it played a key role in launching the band's early careers and provided a stage for local acts like Gerry and the Pacemakers & Rory Storm and The Hurricanes. As the headquarters of Jacaranda Records, the club continues to operate as a live music venue, record store, and bar, maintaining its place in Liverpool's music scene for over 60 years.

== History ==
Local promoter and businessman Allan Williams opened The Jacaranda in September 1958 in a former watch-repair shop at 21 Slater Street, Liverpool. The venue attracted a youthful clientele by offering one of the city's first espresso machines, an American style jukebox, and live music.

He named the venue The Jacaranda, after an exotic species of ornamental flowering tree, Jacaranda mimosifolia.

The venue quickly became a central spoke of the Liverpool music scene, with Williams' friend and sometime business partner, the Trinidadian calypso singer, songwriter and music promoter Lord Woodbine, occupying a nightly residency slot and providing a focal point for many young local musicians.

Described by Williams in The Man Who Gave The Beatles Away as "The Black Hole of Calcutta set to music", The Jacaranda's cramped basement provided the UK with what is considered to be one of its first truly multicultural venues, bringing together a mixed audience of immigrants, bohemians and students to enjoy a blend of musical acts that ranged from calypso and steel drum acts to an emerging generation of rock and roll bands. It was also to become the gateway to international attention for many local artists, with Williams organising a series of tours of Hamburg for several acts including Derry and the Seniors following a successful pathfinding visit by Woodbine in 1960.

Among those who became regulars at The Jacaranda were John Lennon, Paul McCartney, George Harrison, and Stuart Sutcliffe, who approached Allan Williams for a chance to rehearse and perform at the venue. As part of the deal, the future Beatles were allowed to use the basement as a rehearsal studio during the day in return for redecorating the performance space. The restored murals by Sutcliffe and Lennon can still be seen there today.

The Jacaranda became a key base for the band. It was there that Lennon wrote one of his earliest songs, One After 909, with the group playing several performances as The Silver Beetles and also using the venue to audition drummers including Pete Best. Leaving the club in a van driven by Lord Woodbine and Williams for a career-defining first tour of Hamburg in 1961, it was also the venue where the act first announced changing its name to The Beatles.

Even after the relationship with Williams ended, The Beatles recruited the drummer of Jacaranda regulars Rory Storm and the Hurricanes' – soon to be known as Ringo Starr – to replace Best and ultimately signed another frequent club visitor Brian Epstein as the manager who would take them on to global fame.

== Present day ==
In 2006, The Jacaranda was awarded a Pubs in Time plaque by the Campaign for Real Ale (CAMRA) for its role in the formative years of the Beatles.

Wirral native Graham Stanley took ownership of The Jacaranda in 2010, after which the venue closed in 2013 due to financial difficulties. A year later The Jacaranda re-opened under a "deliberate mandate" to shift its focus towards that of a grassroots music venue championing newer upcoming acts, much in the same way the venue had previously been utilised by some of its more famous alumni in the 1960s. Many new rising stars from the Northwest have since started their careers at the venue, such as Luvcat, Crawlers, Stone, The Lathums and many more.

2015 saw the birth of Jacaranda Records founded by Stanley, located at the top floor of The Jacaranda Club. Since then, the store has established itself as a powerhouse in the North West, putting on many album launch shows, some of the more notable include Crowded House, Yungblud, Foals, Paolo Nutini, Mumford and Sons, Stereophonics, Wunderhorse, Jacob Collier, The Pretenders, Wallows, and Blossoms.

In August 2024 The Jacaranda was awarded a blue plaque commemorating the venue as the first place The Beatles performed with the lineup of Lennon, McCartney, Harrison, Suttclife and Best. Performances on the day came from The Zutons, Red Rum Club, The Cheap Thrills and many others.
