= Walter W. Thomas =

Welsh pub architect

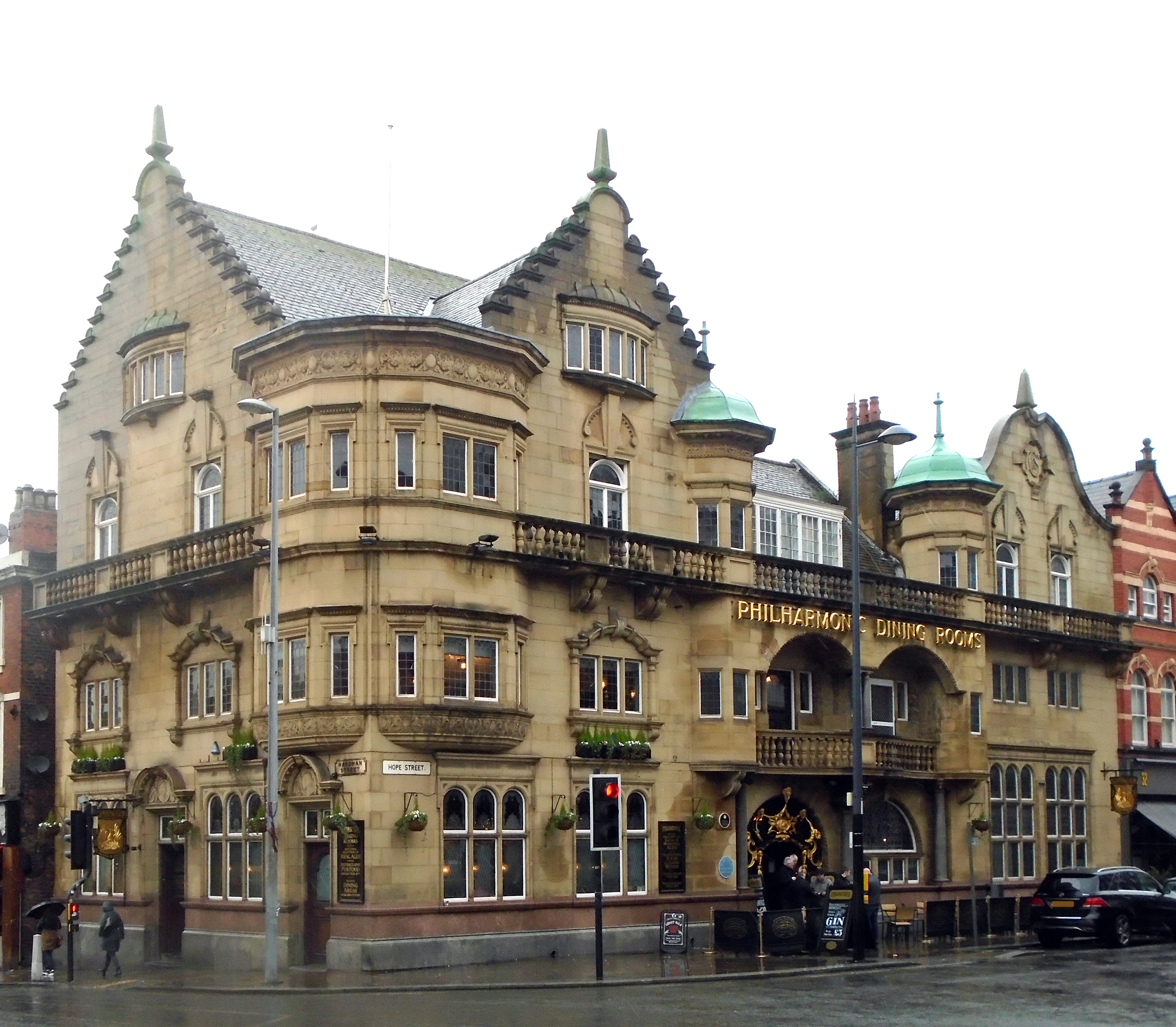
- Thomas' Philharmonic Dining Rooms
- Born: Walter William Thomas; April 1849; Haverfordwest, Wales
- Died: 30 October 1912 (aged 63); Liverpool, England
- Occupation: Architect

Walter William Thomas (April 1849 – 30 October 1912) was a Welsh architect who practised in the English city of Liverpool and specialised in the design of pubs.

Thomas' most notable work is the Philharmonic Dining Rooms on Hope Street, built around 1898–1900 for the brewer Robert Cain. It is considered to be "of exceptional quality in national terms" and was designated by English Heritage as a Grade II* listed building until February 2020, when it was updated to Grade I and became the first purpose-built Victorian pub in England to gain this honour.

In 1907, Thomas designed the Vines, a public house on Lime Street, also for Cains. This is also listed at Grade II*. In addition, it is generally believed that he designed Audley House on London Road, a shop for Owen Owen, and some of the homes surrounding Sefton Park, as well as additions to the Brook House on Smithdown Road.
