= Baltic Station =

Baltic Station may refer to:

- Baltic Sea Naval Station, a command of the German navy
- Baltiysky railway station, a railway station in St. Petersburg, Russia
- Tallinn Baltic Station, a railway station in Tallinn, Estonia
- The name of Moscow Rizhsky railway station from 1930 to 1942
- Liverpool Baltic railway station, a railway station in Liverpool, United Kingdom
