= Jacaranda Records =

British record store

Coordinates: 53.4024°N 2.9796°W

- Industry: Music retail; Live music
- Founded: 2015; 11 years ago in Liverpool, England
- Founder: Graham Stanley
- Headquarters: The Jacaranda
- Number of locations: 2
- Area served: Liverpool City Region
- Key people: Graham Stanley (managing director)
- Website: www.jacarandarecords.com

Jacaranda Records is a Liverpool-based independent record store and live music venue operator founded in 2015 by Graham Stanley.

Headquartered at the historic Jacaranda Club on Slater Street, the 1958 venue associated with launching The Beatles on their early careers, the company currently operates across two locations including The Jacaranda in the Liverpool city centre and Jacaranda Baltic in Liverpool's Baltic Triangle.

Originally established during the 2010s vinyl revival, the company is known for its hybrid operation of live music and music retail across both its venues, as well as its former enterprises in spatial audio technology as part of a record label of the same name. Jacaranda Records has also been involved in several grassroots initiatives with local Liverpool businesses and educational institutions, seeking to forge a link between Liverpool's music heritage and the city's emerging talent.

== History ==
=== 2015–2018: Founding of Jacaranda Records ===
Founded by Graham Stanley who took over as managing director in 2014 amidst the 2010s vinyl revival boom, the store opened on 29 June 2015 on the first floor of the Jacaranda's Slater Street venue following a six month period of refurbishment. Historically the same space was previously occupied in the 1950s by jazz record store Syd's Disk Den.

The store adopted several unusual retail features, taking key inspiration from Jack White's Third Man Records. Like Third Man, Jacaranda featured a working 1948 Voice-o-Graph machine made by Mutoscope which allowed customers to record approximately three minutes of audio, later to be cut and pressed in store. In a 2015 interview with Stanley and then booking manager Joe Maryanji, plans were made to extend the machine's capabilities to record live shows in The Jacaranda's basement performance space. In 2022 Jacaranda produced a series of videos showcasing touring musicians utilising the Voice-o-Graph, inaugurating the series with a performance from Frank Turner.

=== 2018–2023: Phase One and record label ===
Jacaranda's first period of expansion began with the opening of Phase One in May 2018, launching on the Spring Bank Holiday weekend. An evolution of the original Jacaranda Records concept fusing a record store with a bar and live music, the Seel Street venue consisted of 4 dedicated listening booths, a collection of 10,000 vinyl records, and a 400–500 capacity live performance space.

In 2018 British music producer Ray Mia approached Stanley in collaborating to form a record label with plans announced in November to open a record pressing plant and recording studio under the collective Jacaranda Records name. Three months later construction began on the company's first immersive audio facility. Under the direction of Mia as Jacaranda's self-described "Capomaestro", a Sicilian term meaning work foreman or supervisor, in its first year the label signed several emerging Merseyside bands including The Bohos and Spilt as well as opening Liverpool's first purpose built 3D immersive audio recording facility Jacaranda Studios in October 2019.

Mia departed from the project in January 2023, amidst allegations behind his involvement of exploitative label contracts and mismanaged ambition.

=== 2024–present: Jacaranda Baltic and continued expansion ===
In January 2024 Jacaranda Baltic was opened in Liverpool's Baltic Triangle as a successor to Phase One, which had closed on New Years Eve the month prior.

The following year on 25 July 2025, the company celebrated its ten year anniversary with a series of events held across both of its venues.

In promotion of Paul McCartney's twentieth solo studio album The Boys of Dungeon Lane, Jacaranda was chosen to host the record's first public listening event in May 2026. In the lead up to the event a limited run pressing of the record was announced, featuring a replica 1960 Jacaranda Club membership card. In tribute to McCartney's history at the venue, The Jacaranda was temporarily renamed 'The Maccaranda'.

Jacaranda was awarded 'Best Independent Record Store' as part of the 2026 AIM Independent Music Awards.

== Venues and record stores ==
Jacaranda Records runs two live music venues and vinyl record stores in Liverpool, and was shortlisted for Music Week's Independent Retailer of The Year award in 2020. Managing director Graham Stanley also heads 'Out Of Phase Events', a Liverpool based booking, promotion and marketing agency.

=== Operating venues ===
==== 1958–present: The Jacaranda ====
Originally opened by Allan Williams in 1958, The Jacaranda, also known as the Jacaranda Club or The Jac, provided both rehearsal space and a stage for John Lennon, Paul McCartney, George Harrison and Stuart Sutcliffe to perform for the first time as The Silver Beetles. Taken ownership by Graham Stanley in 2010 and refurbished in 2014, the 60-year-old music hub still contains murals painted by Sutcliffe & Lennon and continues to operate as a bar, record store and live music venue with an 80 capacity basement performance space.

In 2025 an initiative was born to reduce bar alcoholic drink prices by 30% when during the support band's set for shows held at the venue. In a move well received by Jacaranda concert punters, the change came about to further propagate the Liverpool band scene by way of better incentivising ticketed patrons to arrive for the local supports.

==== 2024–present: Jacaranda Baltic ====
Established in January 2024 as a relaunch of former venue space Phase One, the Baltic branch was opened in Liverpool's Baltic Triangle featuring a 400 capacity basement performance space and ground level record store.

In June 2026 the Baltic record store was affected by flooding with damages to stock totalling £4,000.

=== Former venue ===
==== 2018–2023: Phase One ====
Opened to create a larger, 400–500 capacity pop-up live music venue in May 2018, Phase One enjoyed five years of operation as both a record store and live music space before closing on New Year's Eve in 2023.

== Record label ==
Early in the label's formation, company founder Graham Stanley was keen to reiterate the distinction between his own record store and venue Jacaranda Records with Ray Mia's Jacaranda Records the label. Allowing Mia permission to utilise the name in exchange for a percentage of the label's shares, Mia sought to curate the label from an assembly of showcases held at the then newly opened Phase One, his vision heavily informed by his interests in binaural recording and 3D immersive audio technology.

Jacaranda's first label signees gleaned from these shows included Runcorn act Spilt and the Liverpool based Shards who in 2019 were each given 10 year contracts. The label signed several emerging UK artists in its first year of operation including Niki Kand, Eli Smart, Gazelle, Tracky, The Post Romantics and The Bohos, the latter who joined the label with Spilt in a collaborative agreement with former home Anvil Records. Breaking away from Jacaranda not too long after, The Bohos later reformed under the name STONE.

Singer-songwriter Aimée Steven became the newest addition to the roster in October 2019, signing a deal with Jacaranda before releasing her first single for the label the following month. In March 2021 the label experimented with the prevailing trend of NFTs being utilised by way of music distribution, releasing a four track album produced by label head Ray Mia under the artist alias mrmmr. Later that same year Jacaranda Records signed Simon And The Astronauts, the band's debut album for the label featuring contributions from American musician Rachel Haden. Tales From The Jacaranda Volume 01, a label compilation consisting of tracks from Spilt, Shards, Steven and mrmmr as well as newer signees Dust Monk and The Phil Jones Experience was released in 2022. Jacaranda's most recent signee Waiting Till Marriage released their debut single on the label in March the same year.

Following Mia's departure from Jacaranda in 2023 the label has remained dormant.

== Grassroots initiatives ==
Jacaranda Campus Label, later to be renamed The Campus Label, was founded in 2024 in collaboration with SAE Institute Liverpool as an educational initiative offering students experience within many facets of the music industry including live event promotion, audio recording and production, content creation and artist management. The collaboration between SAE and Jacaranda Records had been proposed earlier in 2023, SAE having previously partnered with Jacaranda as part of The Jacaranda Basement Tapes live video series, as well as having provided the facilities for Jacaranda's former enterprises in spatial audio.

In a joint venture with vinyl record lathe cut house Fat Monkey Studios held within the same Cains Brewery Village complex as neighbouring Jacaranda Baltic, Jacaranda announced in March 2026 a partnership providing small-batch cuts for up to fifty copies of varied 7", 10" and 12" formats, allowing emerging artists the means to readily cut and sell limited run records whilst simultaneously being able to promote their material at Baltic hosted live album launch shows. Revealed concurrently as part of the collaboration was Jac Cuts, an arrangement by which bands could cut unique editions of existing records. The project was inaugurated with a single-sided limited edition 7" by Kula Shaker released for Record Store Day 2026, recorded utilising Jacaranda's own Voice-o-Graph recording device.

In March 2026 Jacaranda launched the JaCAREanda program in partnership with Merseyside based charity Community Integrated Care, donating music memorabilia obtained from live performances held across their venues to be auctioned in financial support behind the charity's pursuits in music therapy, creative workshops and aged care.
