= Spilt =

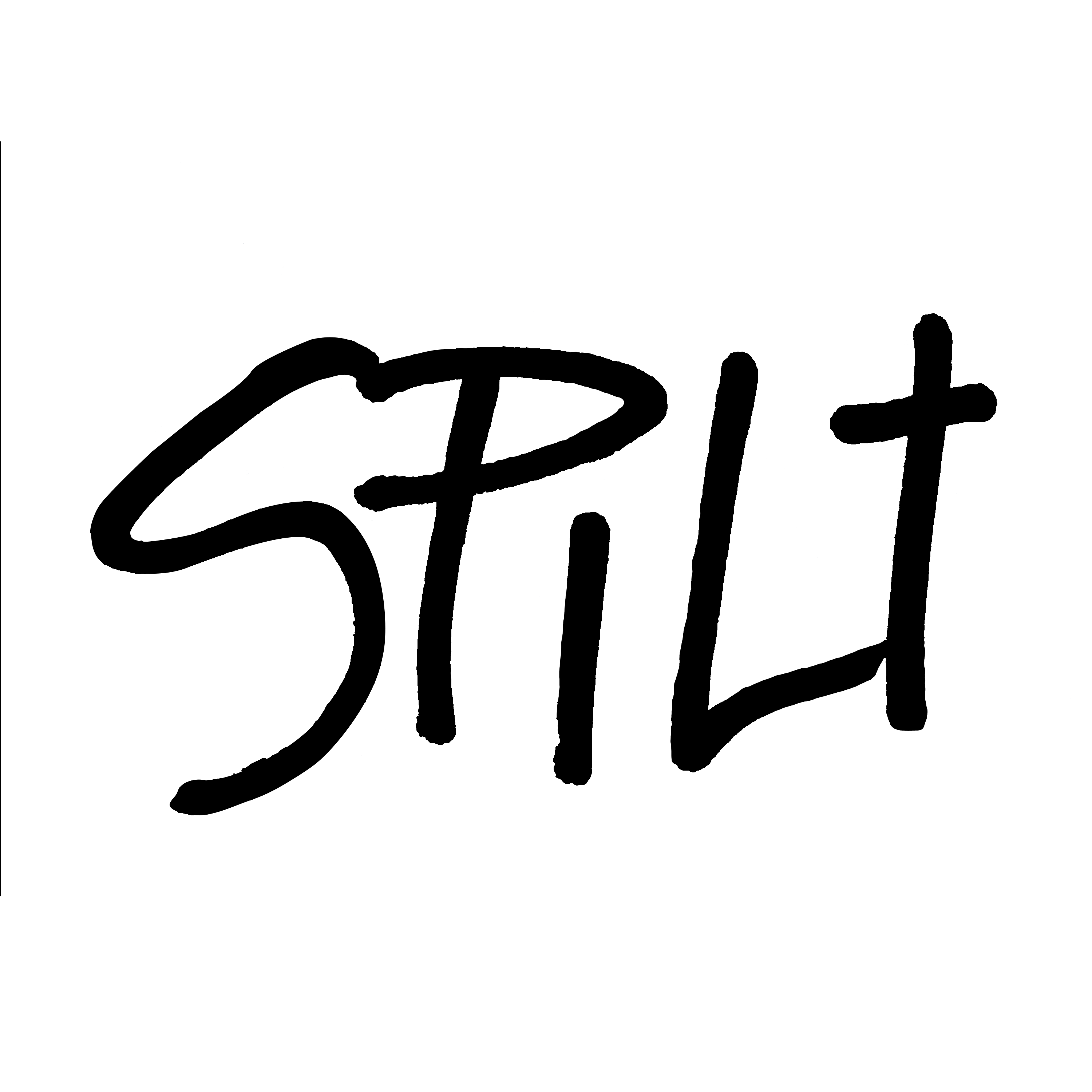

Background information
- Origin: Runcorn, England
- Genres: Rock; pop
- Years active: 2016–present
- Label: Independent DIY
- Members: Morgan "Mo" Molyneux; Ben Cunliffe; Josh Cunningham

Spilt are a British rock band from Runcorn, England. Formed in 2016, the band consists of Morgan "Mo" Molyneux (vocals and guitar) Ben Cunliffe (bass), and Josh Cunningham (drums).

== History ==
Originally founded by Molyneux and Ayres in 2013 as Accepting April, the duo changed the band's name to Spilt in 2015, prior to Josh Cunningham joining the line-up in early 2016.

The band built a reputation playing around Liverpool and its satellite towns in the North of England prior to becoming nationally recognised following their signing onto Jacaranda Records and performing a series of high-profile gigs supporting Fidlar at the O2 Ritz Manchester, and London's Heaven venue.

== Discography ==
=== Singles ===
- "Facemelter" (2017)
- "Catnip" (2018)
- "The Hungry Caterpillar" (2018)
- "Saliva" (2018)
- "Lalka" (2018)
- "Acid Baby" (2018)
- "1984" (2019)
- “Sex tape” (2021)
- ”Nomad” (2021)
- "Fix" (2022)

=== EPs ===
- "Sickly Fit" (2019)

=== Albums ===
- No Ball Games (Stereo Mix) (2019)
