= Lord Woodbine =

Trinidadian musician and promoter (1929–2000)

Harold Adolphus Phillips
- Born: 15 January 1929; Laventille, Trinidad
- Died: 5 July 2000 (aged 71); Toxteth, Liverpool, U.K.
- Resting place: Allerton Cemetery, Liverpool
- Other name: Lord Woodbine
- Occupations: Musician, music promoter

Harold Adolphus Phillips (15 January 1929 – 5 July 2000), known as Lord Woodbine, was a Trinidadian calypsonian and music promoter. He is regarded by some as a musical mentor of the Beatles, and has been called the "sixth Beatle".

== Early life ==
Phillips was born in Laventille, Trinidad. In 1943, at the age of 14, he lied about his age and joined the RAF. After World War II, he went back to Trinidad in 1947, where he started to sing calypso. He returned to England in 1948 on the HMT Empire Windrush, the ship which carried the first boatful of West Indian immigrants to post war Britain. The boat also transported two other calypso singers, Aldwyn Roberts (Lord Kitchener) and Egbert Moore (Lord Beginner).

Phillips lived in Clapham before moving to Wellington in Shropshire. His calypso band, Lord Woodbine and his Trinidadians, was one of the first to tour England.

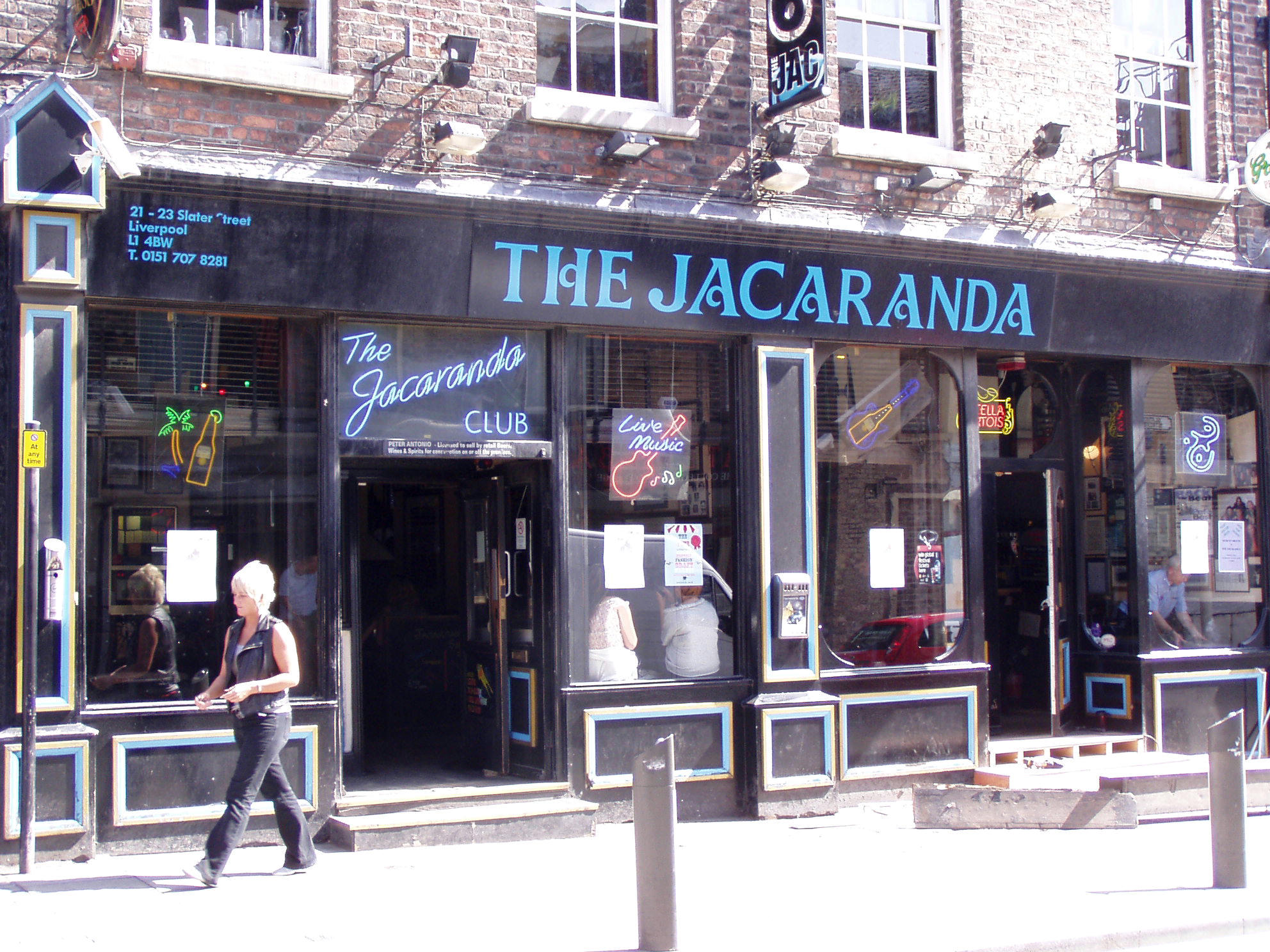
The Jacaranda Club in Liverpool

Phillips had a variety of jobs in the 1950s, and opened the New Colony Club in Liverpool. He also sang calypso and played the guitar. He played a tenor pan as part of the first professional steel band in England, the All Caribbean Steel Band, which was formed by Gerry Gobin in 1955, and played regularly at the Joker's Club and then the Jacaranda Club in Liverpool, owned by Allan Williams. Phillips later played with the All Caribbean Steel Band in their television appearance on the Opportunity Knocks in July 1965. His music and its influence remain relatively obscure because little of his music was recorded.

== The Beatles ==
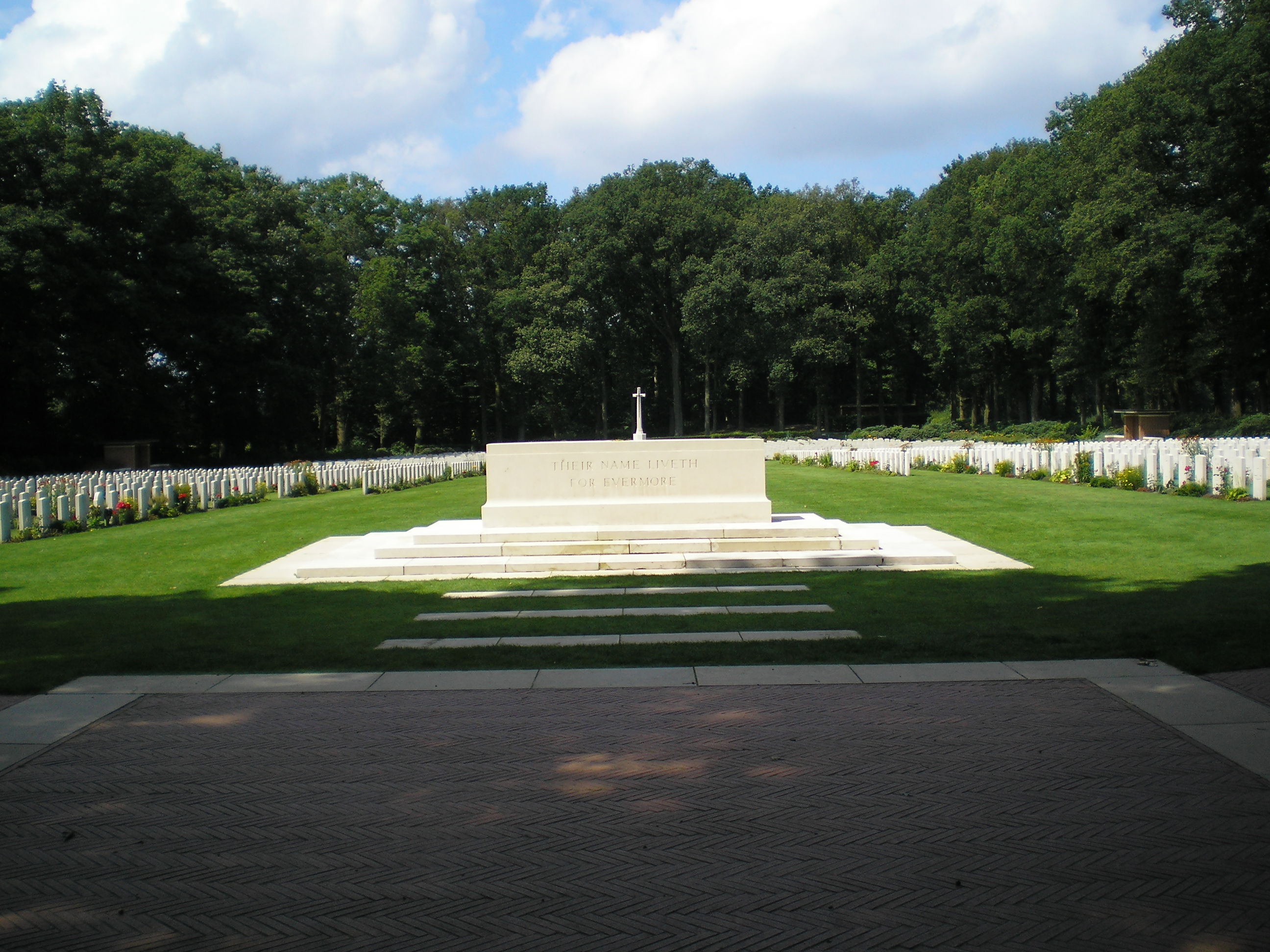
Arnhem Oosterbeek War Cemetery

Phillips was a promoter of the Beatles in their teenage years, then known as the Silver Beetles, and they also played at the Jacaranda Club. The Beatles played at a new club, New Cabaret Artists' Club, that Phillips and Williams opened in 1960, and he helped with their first visit to Hamburg in 1960. He was in favour of adding percussion to their four-guitar band and Pete Best joined John Lennon, Paul McCartney, George Harrison and Stuart Sutcliffe in August 1960. Phillips drove the Beatles to Hamburg in an Austin minibus. En route, they were photographed together at Arnhem Oosterbeek War Cemetery. He performed as Lord Woodbine on the same stage as the Beatles at their first performance in Hamburg in August 1960. It has been incorrectly stated that the Beatles were once known as "Woodbine's boys". Phillips became the manager of another Liverpool club, the Blue Angel, in 1961, also owned by Williams. After an argument with Williams over fees, the Beatles engaged Brian Epstein as their manager in November 1961 and lost contact with Phillips.

== Personal life and death ==
Phillips married Helen Agoro in 1949, in Liverpool. She sang with another of his bands, the Cream of Trinidad. They lived in Toxteth, and had one son and seven daughters.

Phillips later ran a second-hand shop. He and his wife died in a fire at their home in Toxteth on 5 July 2000. He was buried in Liverpool's Allerton Cemetery.

In 2025, a plaque was unveiled at the Jacaranda Club by the Windrush Foundation, commemorating Phillips and his cultural impact.

His daughter Barbara Phillips became a playwright, and wrote episodes for Brookside.

== In fiction ==
In the 1994 film Backbeat, Lord Woodbine was played by the actor Charlie Caine. He will be played by Jorden Myrie in the 2026 BBC television drama Hamburg Days.
