= Cains Brewery =

Former brewery in Liverpool, England

Coordinates: 53°23′37″N 2°58′41″W

Robert Cains Brewery
- Industry: Alcoholic beverage
- Founded: (1858)
- Founder: Robert Cain
- Defunct: June 2013
- Headquarters: Liverpool, England
- Products: Beer
- Production output: 500,000 UK barrels
- Owner: Sudarghara and Ajmail Dusanj
- Website: www.cains.co.uk

Cains was a brewery in Liverpool, England, founded in 1858 by Robert Cain. The company merged with Peter Walker & Son in 1921 to form Walker Cains. Peter Walker & Son had a large brewery in Warrington so sold its Liverpool brewery to Higsons in 1923. Boddingtons of Manchester took over in 1985. In 1990, Whitbread acquired Boddington's brewing operations and closed the brewery. It was reopened by GB Breweries, who became part of Bryggerigruppen in 1991, and in 2002 was sold to Gardener-Shaw for £3.4 million.

In 2013 debts exceeding £8m led to the brewery's closure.

== History ==
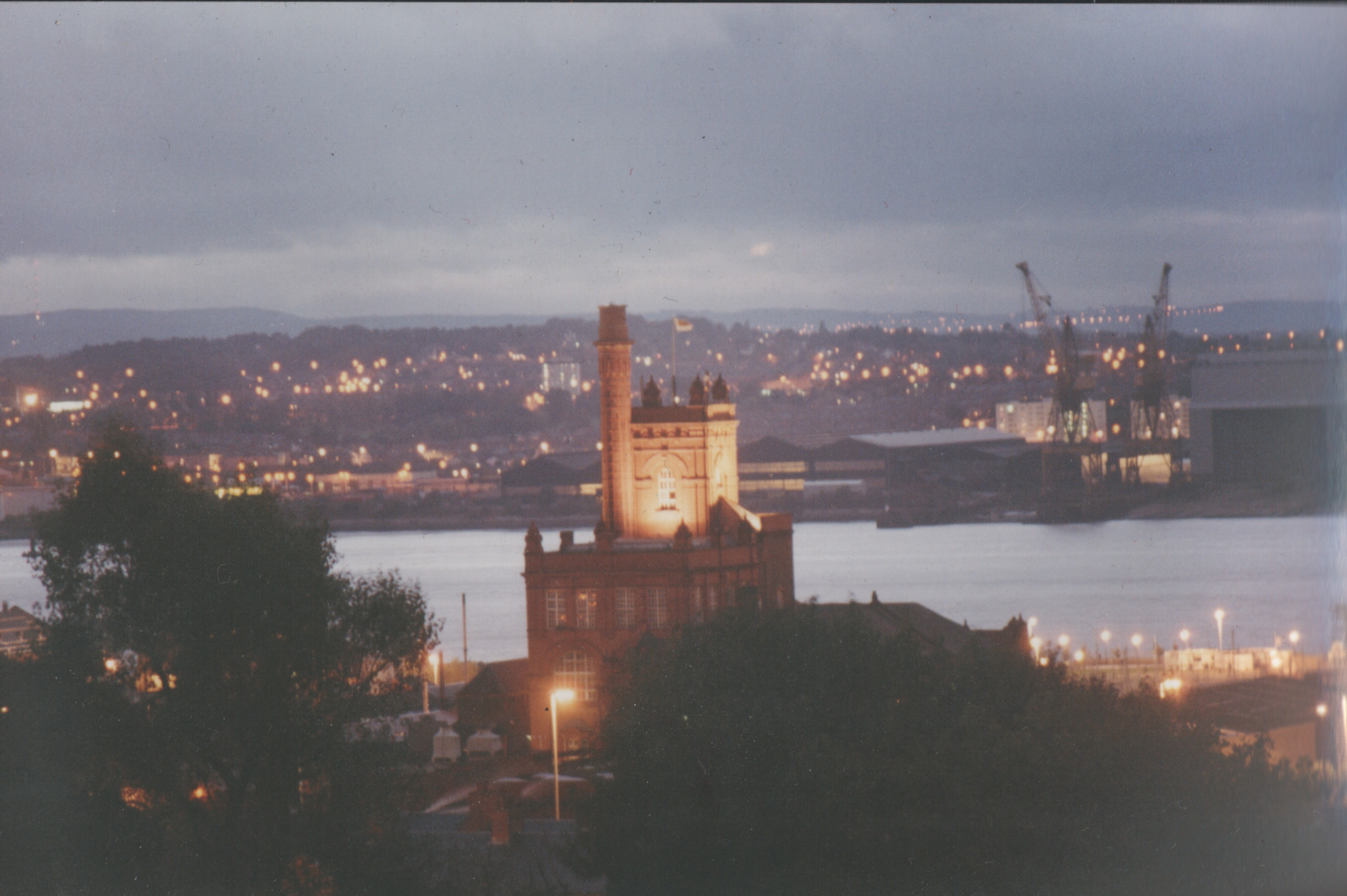
Cains Brewery in the early evening

The Cains brewery was founded by Irishman Robert Cain in 1858 when he bought an established brewery. Cain had begun his brewing career aged 24 when he purchased a pub and brewed his own ales.

Within 25 years of founding his brewery, Cain had established 200 pubs, including the Philharmonic Dining Rooms, the Vines and the Central Commercial Hotel, which are currently listed as being of architectural merit. His personal mansion had each window arch inscribed with his monogram. In 1887 construction began on a second brewery.

In 1921, 14 years after Cain's death, the Cains brewery merged with Walkers of Warrington, becoming Walker Cains. Then in 1923 the original Stanhope Street Brewery was sold to Higsons, who continued to brew Cains ales.

In 1985, Higsons was bought by Boddingtons of Manchester. Five years later Boddingtons opted to concentrate on pub ownership and sold all its breweries to Whitbread, at which point the Stanhope Street site was closed.

== Rebirth of Cains ==
The Stanhope site with its modern canning lines had been heavily invested in under Boddingtons' ownership and appeared an attractive asset. It was acquired by the previous owners of Gee Bee Soft Drinks who had sold that business to Princes. The new owners re-established the business under the Robert Cain brand but most of their production was focused on production for supermarkets.

Viewing Cains as a route into the UK market, Faxe Bryggeri A/S (now Royal Unibrew) then acquired the company and invested in its ales and local pubs. Unlike its larger competitor Carlsberg, Faxe failed to crack the UK market and put Cains up for sale in 2002.

== The Dusanj Era ==
Cains was acquired in 2002 by the Dusanj brothers making them the first Asian owners of a British brewery. At the time it had a turnover of £30 million, but took just over ten years to go into administration with debts, indicating a loss of £38 million - sinking over £3.5 million per year.

In 2007, a reverse takeover of AIM-listed pub operator Honeycombe Leisure plc was agreed by the company's board, giving Cains access to Honeycombe's 109 outlets and a stock market listing. The company was renamed Cains Beer Company PLC and, like Cains Brewery, ceased to function and accrued insurmountable debts within a year.

In 2008, the company was placed in administration due to unpaid tax and other debts amounting to £38 million, despite its annual turnover of £65.5 million. Negotiations with its bank failed to reach a conclusion that would have avoided administration. The brewery and eight original pubs were bought back by the Dusanj brothers for £103,750. As the Dusanji family holds the freehold to the brewery site and controls the terms of any lease for brewery operation, no other buyer could be found.

In 2013, it ended contract brewing and production of supermarket beers, and then ceased brewing altogether, finding a contract brewer for its own beers. 38 staff were made redundant. Cains was down to an estate of three pubs – the Brewery Tap, Dr Duncan's and The Dispensary. By 2015, it had an estate of five pubs, the additional two being Kelly's Dispensary in Smithdown Road and The Edinburgh in Wavertree.

In 2013, Cains began a redevelopment of the site for leisure and housing with a small craft brewery to continue production of its ales.

In 2014, Cains arranged for small quantities of its beers to be contract-brewed for export and sale in it pub estate.

== Cains Brewery Village ==
Liverpool City Council granted planning permission for Cains Brewery Village in 2013. This was described as a tourism, leisure and retail attraction. The million square foot site would have included a 94-bedroom hotel, cinema, bistro bar, restaurants and an open-plan retail hall for artisan food producers.

A food hall opened on the site in 2017. It was open four times a week and operated by Baltic Markets, offering food, drink, entertainment and live events. In 2019, Bongo's Bingo opened their own purpose built venue, Content.

Brewing restarted at the site in the spring of 2022, using the original recipes. In April 2023, brewing stopped due a royalties dispute between the owners of the Cains brand (Dusanj Brothers) and the micro brewery operator, Mikhail Leisure.

Planning permission was granted for a £3.5 million 'BOXPARK' foodhall and events space in January 2023. Intended to replace the existing food and drink hall, the new facility will have ten kitchen units with three internal bars as well as exterior bars and a garden for outside dining.

The following year Jacaranda Records became the newest addition to the village, in January 2024 opening Jacaranda Baltic as both a 400-capacity live music venue and record store space.
