= Philharmonic Dining Rooms =

Listed pub in Liverpool, England

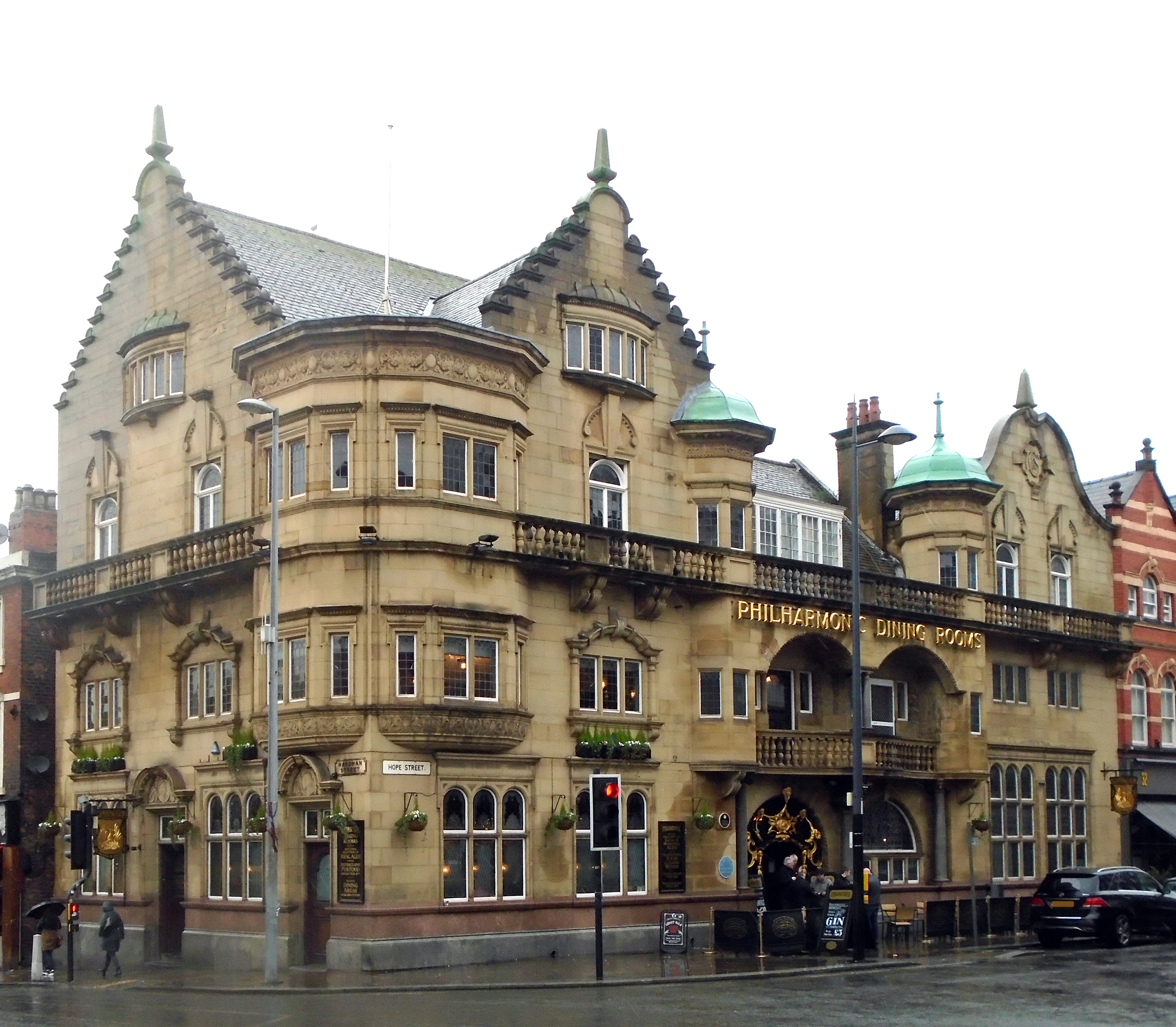
- The pub in 2017
- Alternative names: The Phil

General information
- Type: Public house
- Architectural style: Exuberant Free
- Location: Hope Street and Hardman Street, Liverpool, Merseyside, England
- Coordinates: 53.40174°N 2.97055°W
- Grid position: SJ 356 899
- Year built: 1898–1900; 126 years ago
- Client: Robert Cain
- Owner: Mitchells & Butlers

Design and construction
- Architect: Walter W. Thomas
- Other designers: C. J. Allen and Henry Bloomfield Bare
- Designations

Listed Building – Grade I
- Official name: The Philharmonic Dining Rooms
- Designated: 12 July 1966
- Reference no.: 1207638

Website
- Official website

The Philharmonic Dining Rooms, commonly known as The Phil, is a Grade I listed public house at the corner of Hope Street and Hardman Street in Liverpool England. Built between 1898 and 1900 for the brewer Robert Cain, it was designed by Walter W. Thomas and is noted for its late-Victorian architecture and exceptionally intact interior. On 30 January 2020, the building was upgraded from Grade II*, becoming the first purpose-built Victorian public house in England to receive the highest grade of listing. The pub's interior is regarded by the Campaign for Real Ale (CAMRA) as being of "outstanding national historic importance" and is included in its National Inventory of Historic Pub Interiors with a three-star rating.

== History ==
The public house was built between 1898 and 1900 for the brewer Robert Cain. It was designed by Walter W. Thomas, a Liverpool architect noted for his pub commissions, and its interior decoration was executed by craftsmen associated with the School of Architecture and Applied Arts at University College Liverpool under the supervision of G. Hall Neale and Arthur Stratton. Contributors to the interior included the sculptor C. J. Allen and the architect and designer Henry Bloomfield Bare. The building formed part of the expansion of the Robert Cain brewery empire, which by the late 19th century controlled more than 200 public houses in the city.

On 12 July 1966, the Philharmonic Dining Rooms was designated a Grade II* listed building. The listing was amended on 30 January 2020, when it was upgraded to Grade I, becoming the first purpose-built Victorian public house in England to receive the highest grade of listing. It is regarded by the Campaign for Real Ale (CAMRA) as having an interior of "outstanding national historic importance" and is rated three stars on its National Inventory of Historic Pub Interiors.

Paul McCartney performed at the Philharmonic when he was a young musician, and during an impromptu concert in 2018. As of May 2026, the freehold was owned by Mitchells & Butlers, and the pub was operated under its Nicholson's brand.

== Architecture ==
=== Exterior ===
The building is constructed in ashlar stone with a slate roof in an "exuberant free style" of architecture. It has a combination of two and three storeys, with attics and cellar. There are ten bays along Hope Street and three along Hardman Street. Its external features include a variety of windows, most with mullions, and some with elaborate architraves, a two-storey oriel window at the junction of the streets, stepped gables, turrets with ogee domes, a balustraded parapet above the second storey, a serpentine balcony (also balustraded) above the main entrance in Hope Street, and a low relief sculpture of musicians and musical instruments. The main entrance contains metal gates in Art Nouveau style, their design being attributed to H. Bloomfield Bare.

=== Interior ===
There are five floors in total, including a cellar and former living quarters. The interior retains an exceptionally complete late-Victorian layout, with a series of bars and rooms arranged around a central servery. Musical themes reflecting the nearby concert hall are incorporated throughout, notably in repoussé copper panels designed by Henry Bloomfield Bare and Thomas Huson, and plasterwork by C. J. Allen. Surviving features include mosaic floors, mahogany panelling and screens, stained, leaded and etched glass, decorative tiling, ornate plaster ceilings and original bar fittings. Notable elements include a large inglenook fireplace, the former billiard room (now the Grand Lounge) with stained-glass rooflights and elaborate decorative plasterwork, and the richly decorated gentlemen's lavatories, which retain marble urinals and washbasins, brass fittings and mosaic flooring. Two smaller rooms are named after the composers Brahms and Liszt.

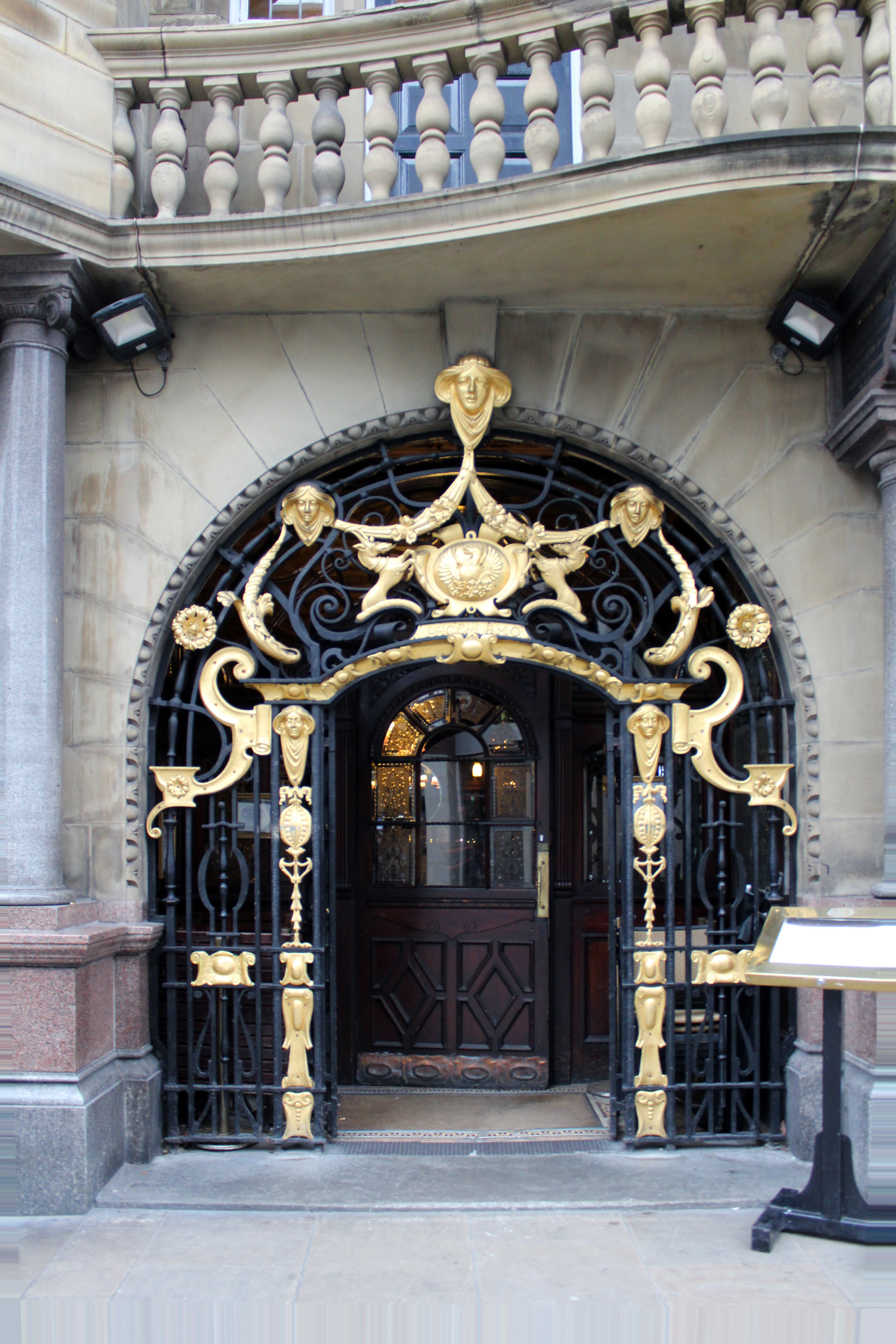
Art Nouveau gates in main entrance

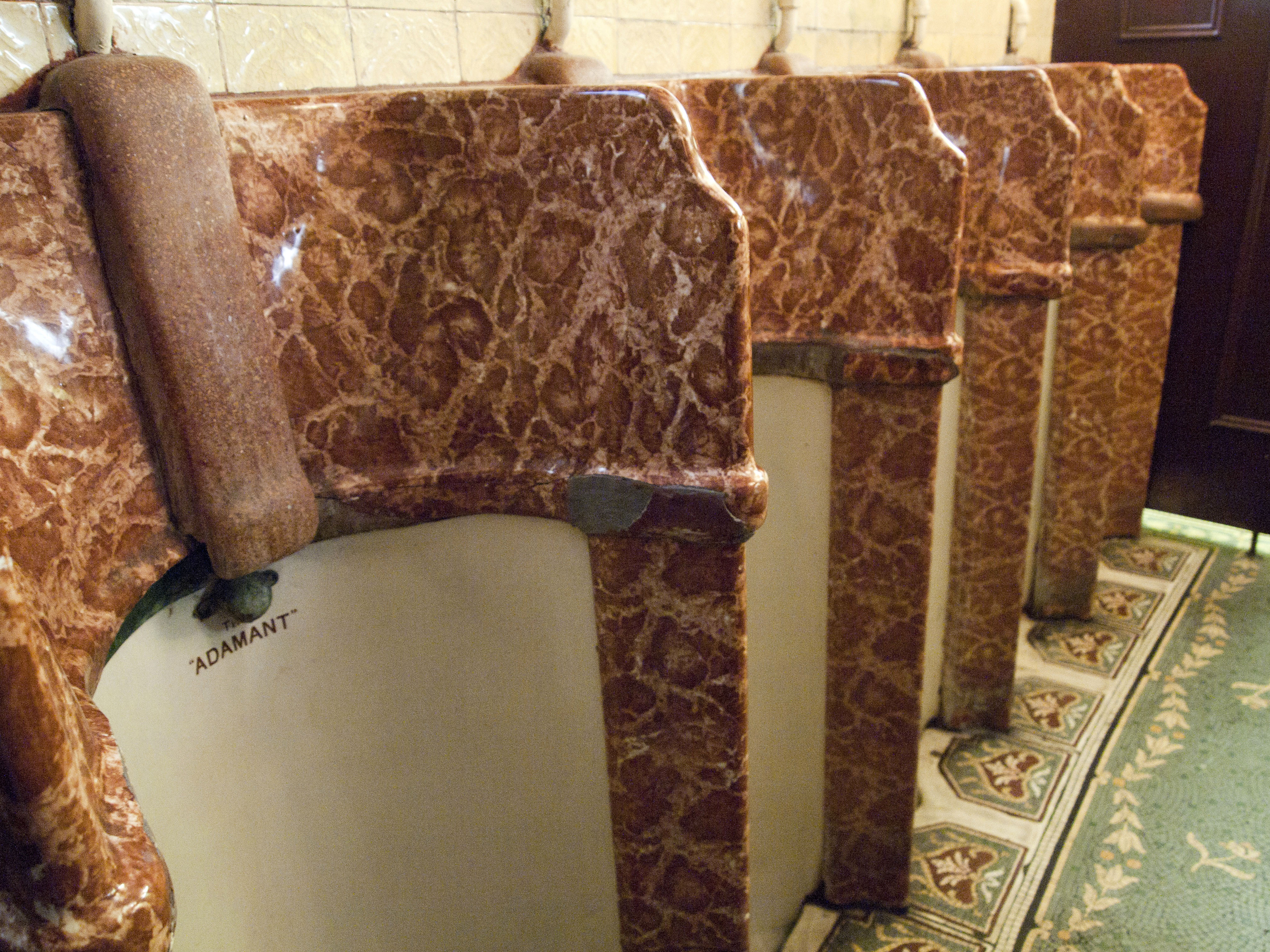
Rose-coloured imitation-marble urinals in the Philharmonic Dining Rooms

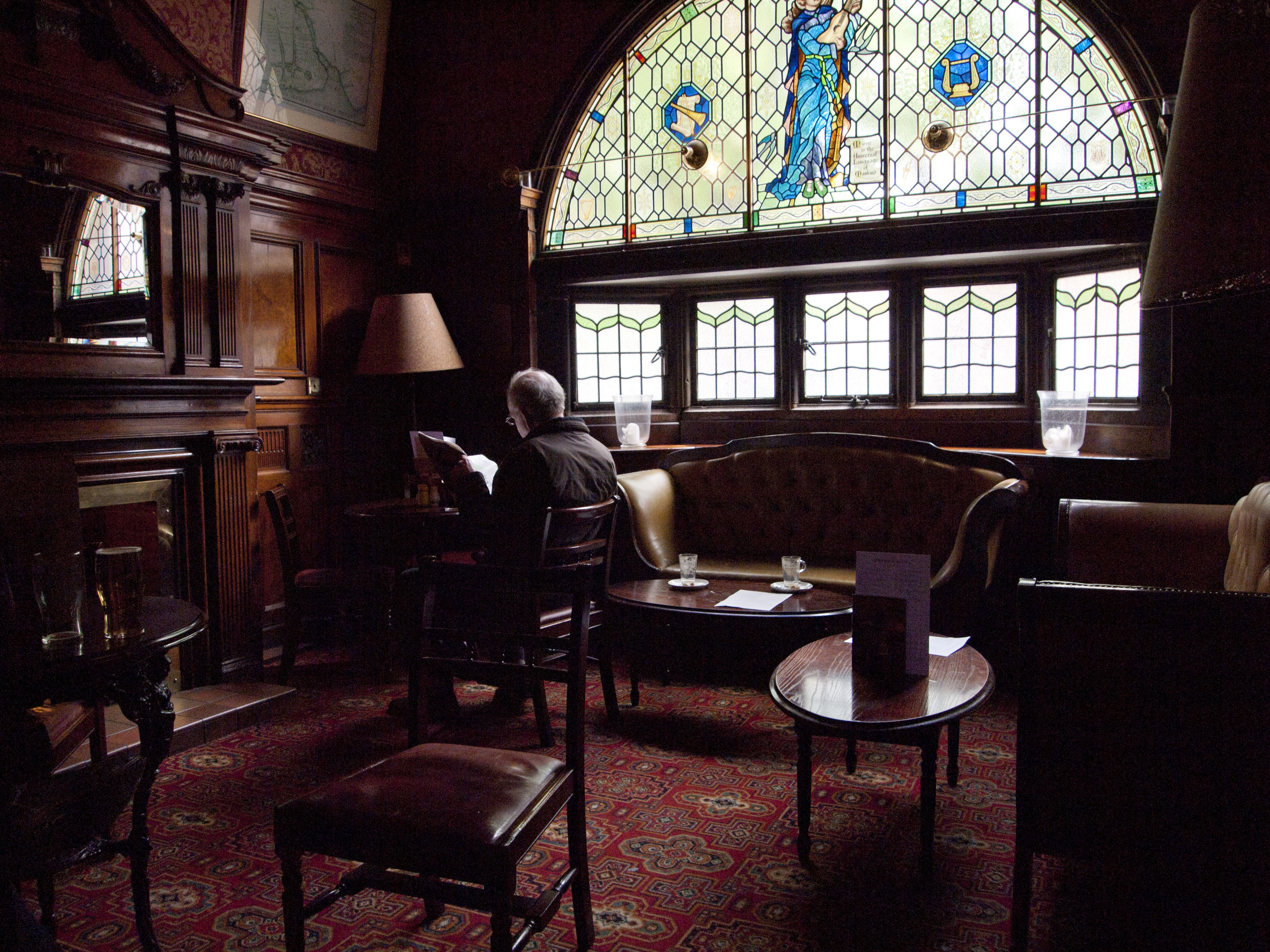
Interior view of the Philharmonic Dining Rooms

== Appraisal ==
Pollard and Pevsner, in the Buildings of England series, state that it is the most richly decorated of Liverpool's Victorian public houses, and that "it is of exceptional quality in national terms". The Grade I listing means that it is "of exceptional interest". Pye describes it as one of Liverpool's "architectural gems".

== See also ==
- Architecture of Liverpool
- Grade I listed buildings in Liverpool
