= Stone (British band) =

English band

- Genres: Alt rock; indie rock; post-punk; Britpop revival
- Years active: 2019–present
- Label: Polydor Records
- Spinoff of: The Bohos
- Members: Fin Power; Elliot Gill; Sarah Surrage; Alex Smith
- Website: www.stone.band

Stone, stylised uppercase as STONE, are an English alternative rock band, formed in Liverpool out of The Bohos and consisting of members Fin Power, Elliot Gill, Sarah Surrage, and Alex Smith. After two EPs and a number of singles, the band released their debut album Fear Life for a Lifetime in 2024.

== Members ==
- Finley Jake "Fin" Power (born 2000), lead vocals and guitar and the son of John Power
- Elliot Gill, lead guitar (born 1991, Birkenhead)
- Sarah Lucy Surrage (born 2000/2001), bass
- Alex Smith, drums

== Career ==
=== 2015–2018: The Bohos ===
Fin Power and Elliot Gill started off as members of the band The Bohos, which formed in late 2015 and began releasing music in 2017 with bassist Ian Grant and drummer Jack Danily, supporting DMA's on tour. Drummer Alex Smith, whom Power knew from sixth form, replaced Danily in 2018. The Bohos changed their image often. As The Bohos they were affiliated with Jacaranda Records, who signed them in a collaborative agreement with their former label Anvil Records.

=== 2019–2023: Rebranding to STONE ===
Despite a strong formative start, upon entering their twenties with a clearer sense of identity, Power and Gill felt a rebrand was necessary, forming Stone in 2019 and joining Creation Management. The name Stone alludes to Power's mother's maiden name and Jewish heritage. Smith knew bassist Sarah Surrage from university, who joined the band at the start of 2020. Later that year, they released their first singles under the new moniker "Leave It Out" and "Keep Running". This was followed by the singles "Fuse" and "Let's Dance to the Real Thing" in 2021, the latter of which debuted on BBC Radio 6. Stone performed at Reading and Leeds that summer, after which Stone were invited to support Yungblud on tour. The band also appeared at the Isle of Wight Festival, Liverpool Sound City, on the Leeds BBC Introducing stage, and had joint gigs with The Blinders and Buzzard Buzzard Buzzard.

At the start of 2022, Stone were included in the NME 100 list for the year. After the release of their fifth single "Stupid", Stone had their first headline tour dates in May 2022, with support from Headshrinkers and Seb Lowe. They also had gigs with The Reytons, Eli Smart for BBC Introducing, among others.

In July 2022 on the day they supported Sam Fender's Finsbury Park concert and released the single "Waste", Stone signed with Polydor Records, under Universal Music Group. In August, Stone performed at Louis Tomlinson's 2022 Away From Home Festival in Spain returned to Reading & Leeds on the Festival Republic Stage the same weekend, and made an appearance at Boardmasters Festival. Later in the year, they opened for Inhaler and The Wombats on tour. Through Polydor, Stone released their debut EP punkadonk in November 2022, as well as the single "Money (Hope Ain't Gone)" in the lead up to its release.

In early 2023, Stone supported The Kooks and released the singles "I Let Go" and "Left Right Forward" ahead of their UK headline tour. In the summer, the band featured at the Victorious Festival and Mad Cool. This was followed by Stone's second EP punkadonk2 in September 2023 along with the single "I Gotta Feeling". Stone reunited with DMA's to support their 2023 tour. Stone appeared on Dork's 2023 Hype List.

=== 2024–present: Fear Life for a Lifetime ===
After sharing the tracks "My Thoughts Go" and "Queen", Stone released their debut album Fear Life for a Lifetime, produced by Rich Costey, in July 2024. The album managed to reach #38 in the UK Albums Chart. Around the same time, Stone publicly declined an invitation from Simon Cowell to enter a talent show. At the end of August, the album's song Save Yourself was re-released as a collaboration with Dope Lemon. In the autumn, embarked on a UK and Europe tour, supported by Sounds Mint.

In 2025, Stone left Polydor Records.

== Artistry ==
Stone listen to "everything... from N.W.A. to Led Zeppelin". The Streets is one of Power's favourite artists, while Gill called Nirvana a "massive influence on me growing up". Power writes most of the band's lyrics, drawing upon The Streets, Dave, and Joy Division. When it comes to sound, the band takes inspiration from Pixies The Smashing Pumpkins and Gang of Four in terms of guitar, as well Bonham in terms of drums and bass lines. The band's other influences include old school hip-hop acts such as Ice Cube, Public Enemy and MF Doom; indie and alt bands including Sonic Youth, Interpol and Bloc Party; and the electronic groups The Chemical Brothers and The Prodigy. In a 2023 interview with Rolling Stone, Gill described the band's sound as "eclectic" and "a real blend of styles".

== Other ventures ==
Power, who has ADHD and OCD himself, has worked in youth clubs, as a care worker, and with multiple mental health charities. One of his fundraisers involved walking from Liverpool to Wrexham. Gill has also worked in youth clubs and given free guitar lessons. Smith was a sixth form teacher.

== Discography ==
=== Albums ===
- Fear Life for a Lifetime (2024)
- Autonomy (2026)

=== EPs ===
- punkadonk (2022)
- punkadonk2 (2023)

=== Singles ===
- "Leave It Out" (2020)
- "Keep Running" (2020)
- "Fuse" (2021)
- "Let's Dance to the Real Thing" (2021)
- "Stupid" (2022)
- "Waste" (2022)
- "Money (Hope Ain't Gone)" (2022)
- "I Let Go" (2023)
- "Left Right Forward" (2023)
- "My Thoughts Go" (2024)
- "Queen" (2024)

=== Collaborations ===
- "DOPESICK" (2024) (While She Sleeps featuring STONE)
- "Save Yourself" (2024) (featuring DOPE LEMON)
- "Incel Saviour" (2024) (sounds mint featuring STONE)
