= Robert Cain (brewer) =

Founder of Cain's Brewery

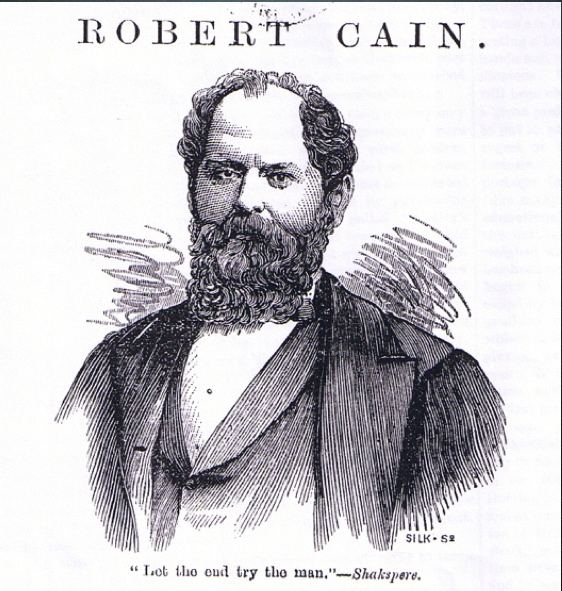
Robert Cain in 1887

Robert Cain (1826–1907) stands as a notable figure in the brewing industry, particularly renowned for his role in establishing Robert Cain and Sons, a prominent brewery located in Liverpool, England.

== Birth and youth ==
He was born on Spike Island, County Cork, Ireland on 29 April 1826, the son of James Cain (1797–1871), a private soldier in the 88th Foot, a regiment of the British Army. There is some dispute over the identity of Cain's mother. Later family records and stories claim that his mother was Mary Deane, the daughter of Alexander Deane, an architect and mayor of Cork. However, in the entry for his brother William in the Liverpool register of births his mother's maiden name is listed as Mary Kirk (died 1864).

== Career ==
The story of the life of Robert Cain and Cains Brewery is told in Christopher Routledge's 2008 history of the brewery, Cains: The Story of Liverpool in a Pint, which unpicks many of the mythologies that have developed around the Cain family. Many of these mythologies seem to date back to the 1920s and 1930s, when Cain's sons William Cain and Charles Nall-Cain were given titles in the British honours system, and centre on the idea that the brewery's founder had a background in the Irish gentry. Such a background would have made his sons more acceptable to the British establishment at the time. However, according to Routledge, Robert Cain was born in poverty in 1826, the son of a private soldier who would soon be forced to leave the army and travel to England to find work. Cain arrived in Liverpool with his parents in late 1827 or early 1828 and grew up in the slums of the Islington area of the city with his older sister Hannah and two younger siblings, Mary and William. When he was in his early teens Cain was indentured to a cooper on board a ship carrying palm oil from West Africa.

After working out his indenture Cain returned to Liverpool in 1844 where he set himself up first as a cooper and soon after, as a brewer. According to Routledge he met Ann Newall, the daughter of James Newall, a shoemaker, and they were married on 4 April 1847 in St. Philip's Church, Hardman Street, Liverpool. He began brewing around 1848 on Limekiln Lane in the Scotland Road area, but soon expanded his operation to a nearby brewery on Wilton Street and finally moved to the existing Mersey Brewery (now known as the Robert Cain Brewery or Cains Brewery) on Stanhope Street, Liverpool in 1858. At the same time as he was developing his brewing business, Cain also made shrewd property deals and ran a hotel near to the brewery on Stanhope Street; as the company grew it expanded by buying out smaller brewers and taking control of their pubs.

== Businessman ==
Cain became one of Liverpool's most successful businessmen with a passion for using the most modern techniques and equipment. He expanded the brewery several times, most notably in 1887 and in 1900–1902, when the landmark redbrick part of the brewery was constructed. By the time of his death on 19 July 1907 Cain was one of Britain's richest men, leaving a personal estate of £400,000 (around £28 million at 2005 prices). He also had political influence, working behind the scenes to help the Conservative Party maintain control of Liverpool throughout the late nineteenth century. In fact he was so influential in the area of Toxteth Park, Liverpool where he lived that he became known as "King of the Toxteths". Contemporary reports of his funeral and burial at St. James's Cemetery suggest as many as 3,000 people attended.

The company, Robert Cain and Sons, owned over 200 pubs in Liverpool but is most notable for having built three of the most gloriously extravagant pubs in Britain: The Philharmonic Dining Rooms, The Vines and The Central. These highly ornate and elaborate pubs, built to celebrate Robert Cain's own success and to demonstrate the skill of Liverpool craftsmen, remain landmark Liverpool buildings in the twenty-first century.

== Example of social mobility ==
Cain is also notable as an example of social mobility in Victorian and early twentieth-century Britain. From the early 1860s the Cains lived in the affluent enclave of Grassendale Park and later owned mansions on Aigburth Road and in Hoylake on the Wirral. In all the Cains had 11 children, including five sons and six daughters. Despite their Irish immigrant background two of his sons joined the British establishment. William Cain became a baronet while Charles Cain, later Charles Nall-Cain, entered the House of Lords in 1933 as the first Baron Brocket, joining several other brewers in what became known somewhat disparagingly as The Beerage. Both sons were noted philanthropists.
