= Heap's Rice Mill =

Former mill in Liverpool, England

Coordinates: 53.39995°N 2.98564°W

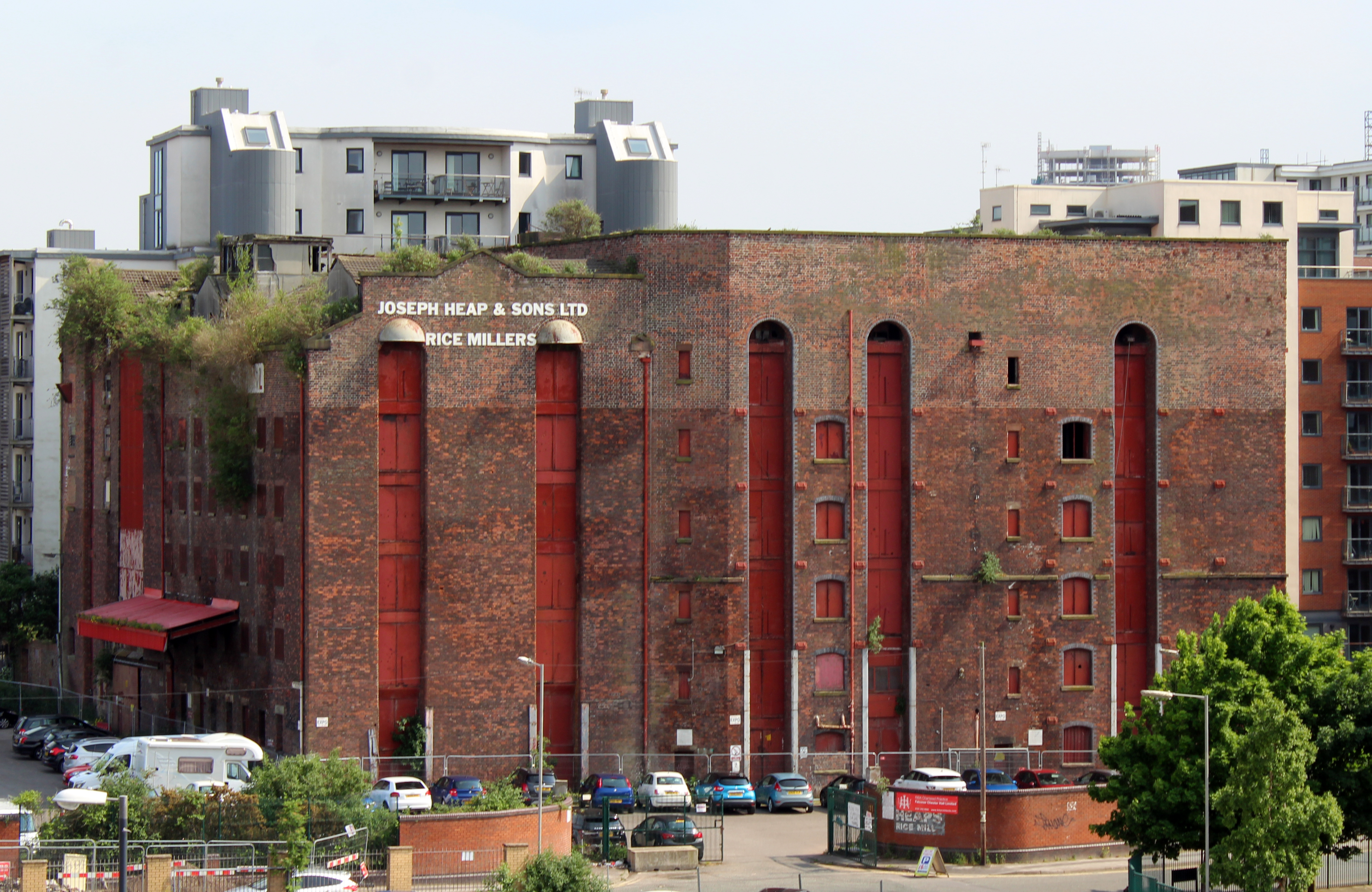
Aerial view of the mill in 2018

Heap's Rice Mill was a rice mill founded by Joseph Heap with Joseph Heap & Sons Ltd. in either 1778 or 1780 on Pownall Street in Liverpool, Merseyside. It originated as a rice mill, with warehouses added and later combined into a single building. The rice in Kellogg's Rice Krispies was once ground at Heap's. It is constructed in brick with some sandstone dressings, and has roofs of slate, tiles and corrugated sheeting and a frame of timber and cast iron. The building has a square plan, and is mainly in seven storeys.

== History ==
Until about the 1880s, Joseph Heap with Joseph Heap & Sons Ltd., owned its own vessels, which were known as the Diamond H Line after their house flag. These ships sailed between Liverpool and Australia, via Rangoon and the East Indies. The firm has had several changes of ownership but was still fully operational until 1988 when it transferred to a new site in Regent Road, Liverpool. The Pownall Street site was still partially operational until 2005.

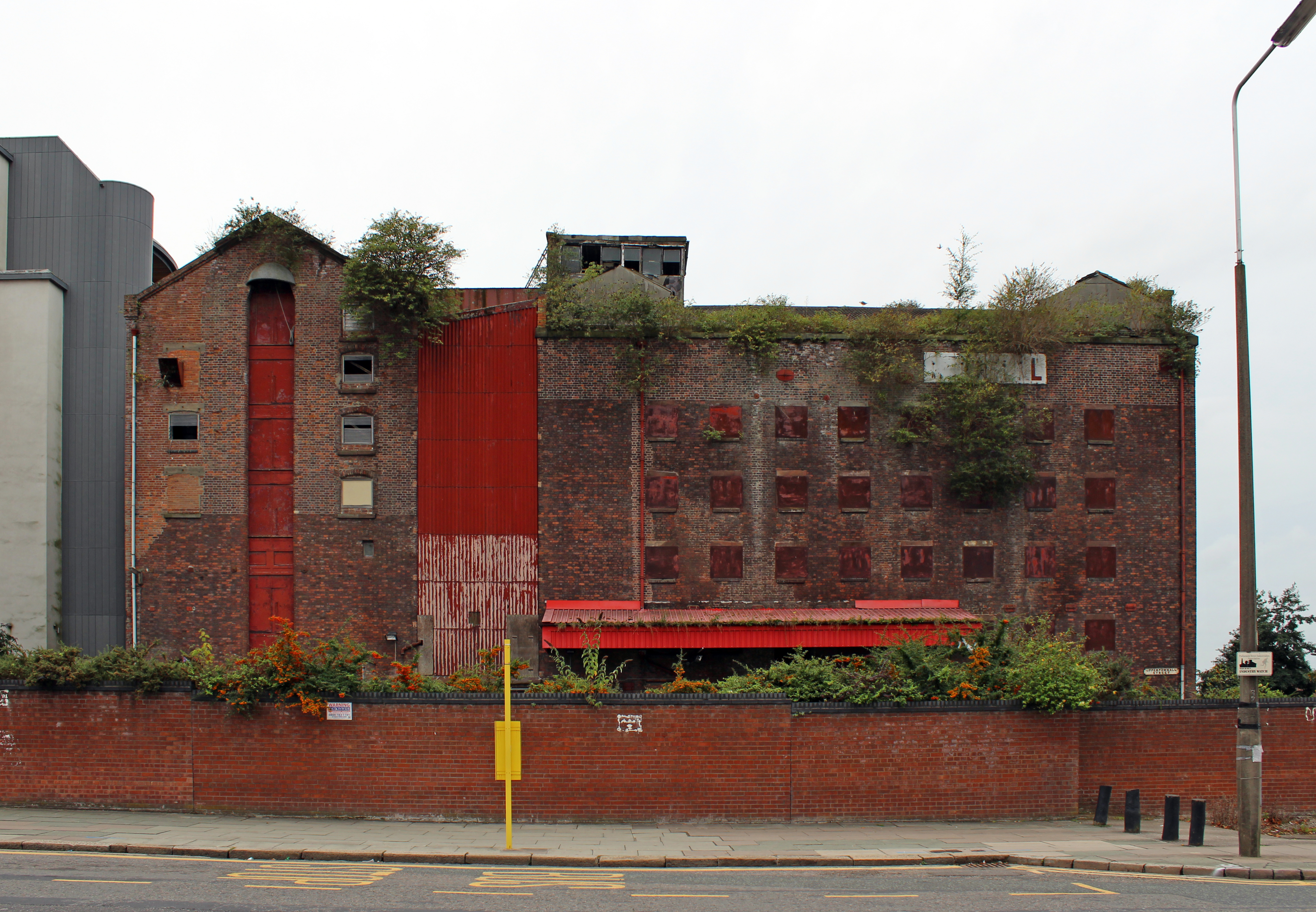
The warehouse in 2017, from Park Lane

The building was due to be demolished until it received Grade II listed status in 2014 from Historic England. Its entry on the list describes it as being: "...a good example of an early and mid-C19 warehouse complex adapted in the late-C19 for a single unified use as a rice processing and storage site; its austere styling being characteristic of the C18 and C19 warehouse buildings that have played a significant role in contributing to Liverpool's World Heritage Site status."

The building displays visible alterations, made since its construction, which illustrates the changing technology which became improved over the years.

There were plans in 2014 to convert the building into luxury apartments as part of a £130 million luxury residential development, but it was criticised by Gill Darley, writing for the Architects' Journal who described the plans as "façadism". This was largely because the developers had wanted to pull out of the redevelopment if they were forced to keep the original interior. In 2017 the site was taken over by the developer Inhabit who disclosed that a planning agreement had been reached and that the work to convert the building into luxury apartments was to be started. Work began in December 2022 and is currently ongoing.
