= Gustav Adolf Church, Liverpool =

Coordinates: 53.3996°N 2.9844°W

Gustav Adolf Church
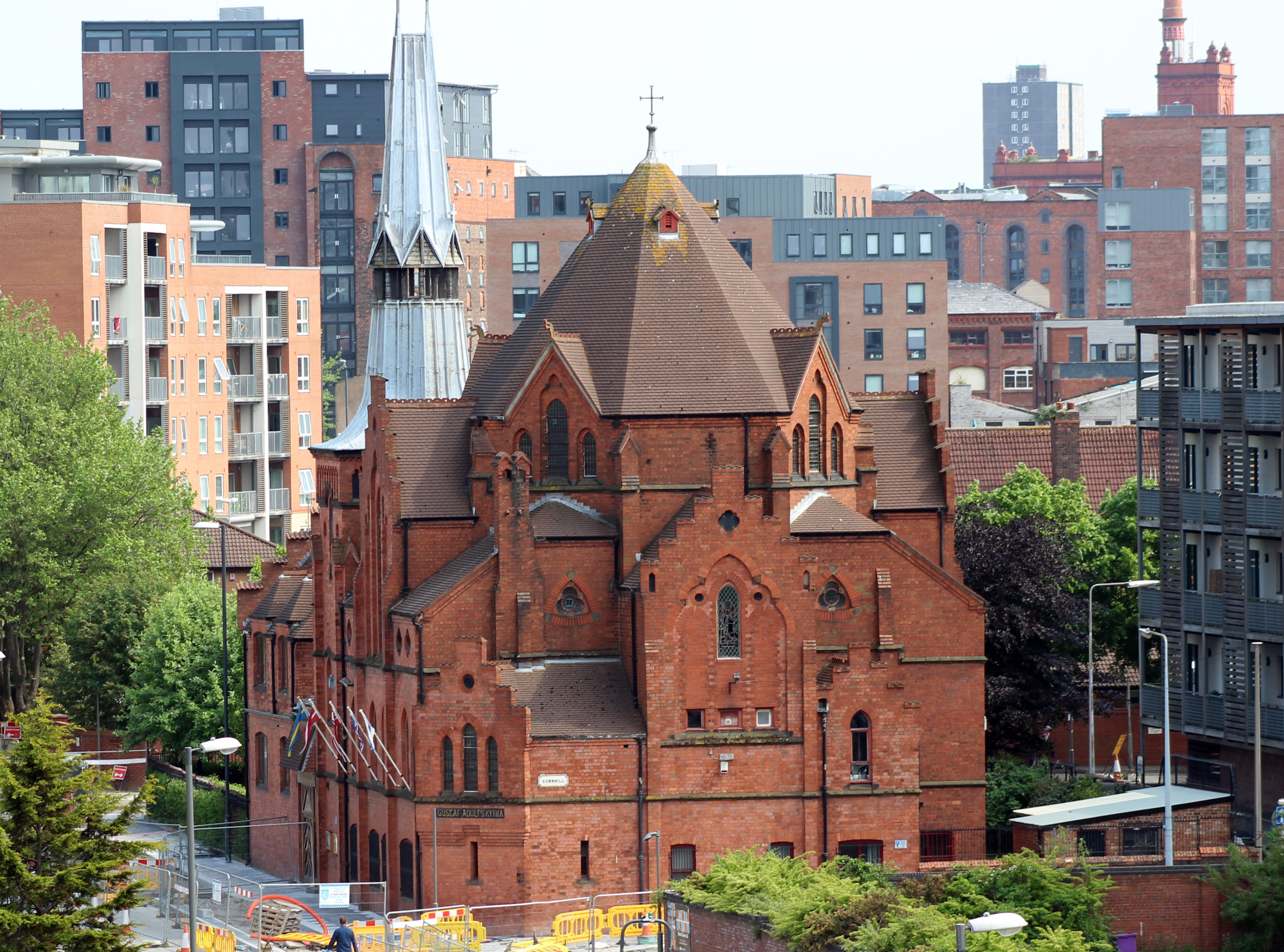
- Gustav Adolf Church

- Location in Liverpool
- OS grid reference: SJ 346 897
- Location: Park Lane, Liverpool, Merseyside
- Country: England
- Denomination: Lutheran
- Website: Liverpool International Nordic Community

Architecture
- Heritage designation: Grade II*
- Designated: 14 March 1975
- Architect: W. D. Caröe
- Architectural type: Church
- Groundbreaking: 1883
- Completed: 1884; 142 years ago
- Construction cost: £15,000 £1,160,000 in Modern GBP

Specifications
- Materials: Brick, tiled roof

Gustav Adolf Church (Swedish: Gustav Adolfs kyrka) or the Scandinavian Seamen's Church (Swedish: Skandinaviska sjömanskyrkan) is a historical building located in Park Lane, Liverpool, Merseyside, England. It consists of a church, built between 1883 and 1884, and an attached minister's house, and provides a centre for the Liverpool International Nordic Community. The combined church and minister's house is recorded in the National Heritage List for England as a designated Grade II* listed building.

== History ==
During the later part of the 19th century, large numbers of Scandinavian emigrants were passing through Liverpool, and there was a need to serve their spiritual needs. The first Scandinavian priest was appointed in 1870, who visited the emigrants in ships and boarding houses. There was perceived to be a need for a permanent centre. The commission to design a church and minister's house was gained by W. D. Caröe, whose father, Anders Kruuse Caröe, was the Danish Consul in the city. It was Caröe's first independent commission to design a church. Building started in 1883 and was completed the following year, at a cost of £15,000 (equivalent to £1,610,000 in 2025). During the 1960s the interior of the church was divided horizontally, when the gallery was removed and a mezzanine floor was added. This was to provide an area for social activity, between the basement and the church itself. At the same time the minister's house was converted from a single-storey building to one with two storeys. Further changes were made in the early 1990s. The lower area was converted into a community meeting room with a kitchen, a café, and other facilities.

== Architecture ==
=== Exterior ===
The building is constructed in red brick, with a roof of tiles and copper sheathing, and consists of a church with a minister's house attached to the southeast. The entrance front on Park Lane is in seven bays, and is in two and three storeys with basements. The central bay consists of a three-storey stair tower, containing windows with pointed arches, and surmounted by a lead-covered spire. At the midpoint of the spire are lucarnes with wooden bargeboards. To the right of this, the middle of the three bays rises to a greater height, and has a crowstepped gable containing three stepped lancet windows. The windows in the ground floor of these three bays have segmental heads, those in the middle storey have pointed heads, and the two lateral bays contain quatrefoil windows. Behind the gable, and rising to a greater height is an octagonal lantern. Around this are four gablets, and on its roof are four small dormers. The lantern is surmounted by a lead finial and cross. The dormers and gablets are decorated with Scandinavian carvings. To the left of the central tower is a modern entrance porch, and to the left of this is the two-storey minister's house, which contains a crowstepped gable on its left side.

=== Interior ===
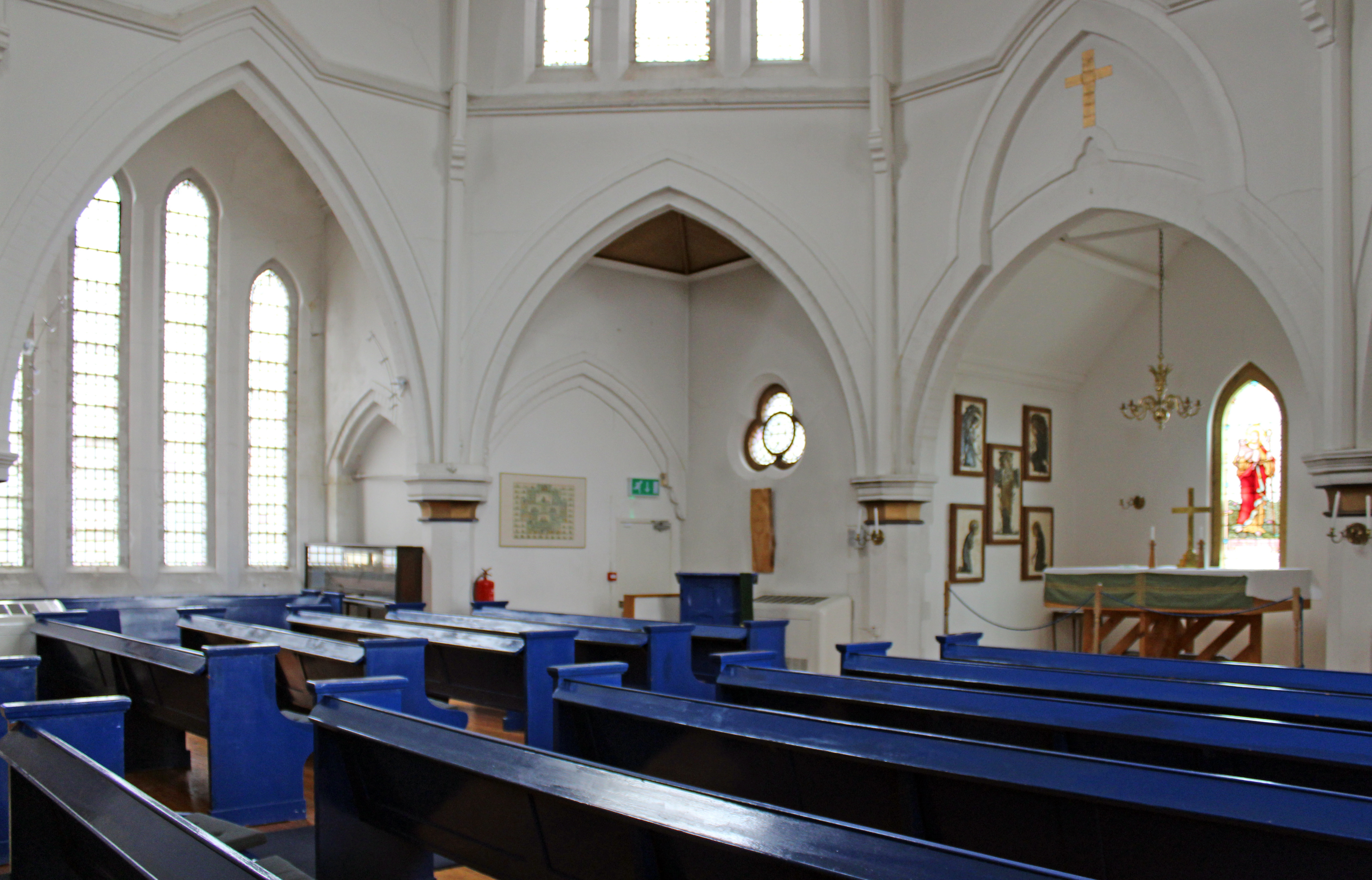
Interior view

The lower floor contains a meeting room, a kitchen, bedrooms, toilet facilities, showers, an office and a television room. The upper floor, under the central octagonal lantern, comprises the church. Inside the church are five plaster reliefs by Robert Anning Bell. These originally formed a reredos, but are now hung separately in the church. Also in the church are two sculptures by the local sculptor, Arthur Dooley, which depict Christ, and the Madonna.

== See also ==
- Grade II* listed buildings in Merseyside
