= Liverpool Baltic railway station =

Planned railway station in Liverpool

Liverpool Baltic

General information
- Location: Baltic Triangle, Liverpool; England
- Coordinates: 53.3939°N 2.9760°W
- Grid reference: SJ 351 890
- Platforms: 2

Other information
- Status: Proposed

Key dates
- 2029: Potential opening
Location

Liverpool Baltic railway station is a proposed station awaiting planning permission in the Baltic Triangle area of Liverpool, England, which is to be built on the Northern Line of Merseyrail. The station is to be built on the site of the former St James station, which closed to passenger services in 1917. A start date for construction is undetermined as of 2026, but Liverpool metro mayor Steve Rotheram has suggested that it could be opened by 2029.

== History ==
In 2012, Liverpool's Strategic Investment Framework listed the reopening of St James as important to the success of the Baltic Triangle development. Merseytravel agreed to work with Liverpool Vision in March 2014 to investigate the cost of reopening the station and its projected usage. In January 2015, Merseytravel confirmed that they would be carrying out a study for the station's potential reopening in the 2015–16 financial year. Merseyrail listed the re-opening of the station as a 'top rail project' during a presentation on rail development and delivery in November 2016.

Merseytravel commissioned a report into the reopening of the station which was completed in September 2017. The report compared reopening St James against the construction of a new station in the Chinatown area of Liverpool. While the report found many benefits to opening a station in the city's Chinatown area, it concluded that: "A new station at St James is feasible and potentially highly beneficial, albeit at a high cost and with correspondingly reduced value for money." Merseytravel's chairman Liam Robinson stated in an interview with the Liverpool Echo in February 2019 that reopening the station would be a significant task and would involve the construction of new platforms, ticket offices, waiting areas and lift shafts.

Liverpool City Region Combined Authority announced in August 2019 that they were planning to use part of a £172 million funding package to reopen the station, subject to the plans being approved.

In October 2020, it was announced that £1.2 million of these funds were to be used to commission Network Rail to complete the next stage of design work for the reopening project. A further £300,000 of these funds had been used to purchase a plot of land adjacent to the station site upon which the Combined Authority hopes a future ticket office might be constructed. In 2020, the Combined Authority applied for additional funding for the reopening project from the third round of the Department for Transport's New Stations Fund. A public vote was put forward in January 2022 by Merseytravel and the Liverpool City Region Combined Authority, to choose a name for the station when it reopens. Officials felt that the existing name for the station would cause confusion with James Street station. The public were asked to choose a new name between:

- Liverpool Baltic
- Liverpool Parliament Street
- Liverpool Riverside

On 12 April 2022, the results of the vote were announced, with 77.7% of the public voting for Liverpool Baltic as the name of the new station.

Planning permission was submitted in February 2025 with construction intended to commence later in the year and the station opening in 2027. However, in January 2026 it was reported that Network Rail had a lack of capacity for new projects (due to work on High Speed 2, Northern Powerhouse Rail, or the Transpennine Route Upgrade) and a primary contractor had yet to be appointed for the new station. This has pushed the intended opening date back at least to 2029. By October 2026, the expected construction cost had increased by £64 million to £160 million.

== Services ==
The station will be between Liverpool Central and Brunswick, and will be served by trains operating between Southport and Hunts Cross.

Preceding station	National Rail	Following station
	Future services	
Liverpool Central	Merseyrail; Northern Line	Brunswick towards Hunts Cross

== Bibliography ==
- Quick, Michael (2009) [2001]. Railway passenger stations in Great Britain: a chronology (4th ed.). Oxford: Railway & Canal Historical Society. ISBN 978-0-901461-57-5. OCLC 612226077.
