= De La Salle School, St Helens =

Voluntary aided school in Eccleston, Merseyside, England

Location
- Mill Brow; Eccleston, Merseyside, WA10 4QH; England; 53.4556°N 2.7695°W

Information
- Type: Voluntary aided school
- Motto: "Our Vision; to pursue excellence"
- Religious affiliation: Roman Catholic
- Established: 1987; 39 years ago
- Founder: De La Salle Brothers
- Local authority: St Helens
- Department for Education URN: 104834 Tables
- Ofsted: Reports
- Chair: Teresa Sims
- Head teacher: Andrew Rannard
- Gender: Coeducational
- Age: 11 to 16
- Houses: Campion - Mount Carmel - West park - Notre Dame
- Colours: By year: 7 – purple, 8 – yellow, 9 – green, 10 – red, 11 – blue
- Website: Official website

De La Salle School, Eccleston, St Helens is an 11-16 coeducational comprehensive Roman Catholic secondary school which is linked to the worldwide La Sallian community. The school in its current form was created in 1987 after the amalgamation of several Roman Catholic high schools in the area (West Park, Notre Dame, St. Edmund Campion and Mount Carmel). Its trustees are the De La Salle Brothers, who have a house nearby.

There are 1,200 pupils and about 140 staff.

== History ==
=== Grammar schools ===
Two of the former schools were West Park Grammar School and Notre Dame High School, both direct grant grammar schools.

The first statement in the Brothers' History of the House was: "September 18, 1911. The school was opened today by our Brothers. The Brothers are Brother Nilus, Brother Alphonse and Brother Francis. We commenced with 37 pupils."

Twelve years earlier in 1899, Father Hearne, the parish priest of Sacred Heart, had bought a house in St George's Road and set up a Catholic school for boys to complement the school for girls opened by the Sisters of Notre Dame. It was recognised as a Secondary School and was receiving small grants from the St Helens Education Committee. The Education Committee subsequently withdrew grants on the grounds of inadequate accommodation and insufficient teaching facilities. The agreement by which the Brothers took over Father Hearne's School in 1911 provided for his house to become the Brothers' residence with adjoining stables becoming two classrooms. In 1911, Brother Nilus opened with 37 pupils. In 1912 the number of students was 100.

== Campus ==
The school completed a large building programme in June 2013. Nearly half of the building stock was rebuilt, while almost all of the remainder was remodelled.

== Notable former pupils ==
- Steve Prescott (1973–2013) - international rugby league player
- Paul Wellens (b. 1980) - rugby league player, St Helens RLFC
- Michael Parr (b. 1986) - actor
- Emma Rigby (b. 1989) - actress
- Stephanie Davis (b. 1993) - actress
- Jason Gilchrist (b. 1994) - footballer
- Andrew Langtree, actor
- David Tench, musician

=== West Park School ===
- David P. Houghton (b. 1966) - Professor of National Security Affairs, Naval War College
- Johnny Vegas (b. 1970) - comedian

=== West Park Grammar School ===
- Bernie Clifton (b. 1936) - entertainer
- Ray Connolly (b. 1940) - screenwriter
- Tom Brophy (b. 1942) - rugby player
- Chris Hesketh (1944–2017) - rugby player
- Sean Hughes (1946–1990) - history teacher, Labour MP, Knowsley South (1983–1990)
- Pete Postlethwaite (1946–2011) - actor
- Ian Lenagan (b. 1946) - businessman, Chairman English Football League
- Brendan O'Neill (b. 1948) - businessman, Executive ICI
- Pete McCarthy (1951–2004) - comedian and television presenter
- John P. Burrows FRS (b. 1954) - Professor of Physics of the Ocean and Atmosphere
- Frank Cottrell-Boyce (b. 1959) - screenwriter
- Andy Platt (b. 1963) - rugby player
- Kevin Simms (b. 1964) - rugby player
- Mick Burke (b. 1941) - mountaineer

=== Notre Dame High School ===
- Mary Tuck (née McDermott) (1928 – 1996) - criminologist, psychologist and civil servant
- Liz Twist (b. 1956) - Labour MP Blaydon (2017–)
- Kathryn Mitchell (b. 1963) - academic, Vice-Chancellor University of Derby
- Ann Williams (b. 1965) - Olympic athlete
