= 2014 St Helens Metropolitan Borough Council election =

2014 UK local government election

Map of the results of the 2014 St Helens Metropolitan Borough Council election. Labour in red, Conservatives in blue and Liberal Democrats in yellow.

The 2014 St Helens Metropolitan Borough Council election took place on 22 May 2014 to elect members of St Helens Metropolitan Borough Council in Merseyside, England. One third of the council was up for election and the Labour Party stayed in overall control of the council.

After the election, the composition of the council was:

- Labour 42
- Conservative 3
- Liberal Democrats 3

== Background ==
After the last election in 2012 Labour controlled the council with 40 seats, compared to 5 for the Liberal Democrats and 3 for the Conservatives. Despite the large majority for Labour the leader of St Helens council, Marie Rimmer, was replaced by her deputy, Barrie Grunewald, in May 2013 after a 22 to 18 vote of the Labour group on the council.

At the 2014 election the leader of the Conservative group on the council, David Monk, stood down as a councillor, along with a Liberal Democrat former mayor Neil Taylor and Labour councillor Carole Gill. However the former Labour leader of the council, Marie Rimmer did defend her seat in West Park at the election, despite being selected as the Labour candidate for St Helens South and Whiston at the 2015 general election.

16 seats were contested in 2014, with candidates from 7 political parties standing for election. The candidates included the Liberal Democrat group leader Stephanie Topping in Sutton, while a former Liberal Democrat mayor John Beirne stood for the UK Independence Party in Town Centre ward.

== Election result ==
Labour gained 2 seats from the Liberal Democrats in Newton and Sutton to have 42 of the 48 councillors on St Helens council. The Liberal Democrat group leader Stephanie Topping was defeated in Sutton, coming third behind the UK Independence Party in the ward, but the Liberal Democrats did hold Eccleston to have 3 councillors after the election. Most of the 13 UK Independence Party candidates came second in the wards they stood in, but the party failed to win any seats on the council, with for instance John Beirne taking 667 votes for the party in Town Centre ward, compared to 1,470 for Labour candidate Lisa Preston. Meanwhile, the Conservatives held the only seat the party had been defending in Rainford to remain with 3 councillors.

St Helens local election result 2014
| Party | Seats | Gains | Losses | Net gain/loss | Seats % | Votes % | Votes | +/− |
|---|---|---|---|---|---|---|---|---|
| Labour | 14 | 2 | 0 | +2 | 87.5 | 52.1 | 21,961 | -10.0% |
| Conservative | 1 | 0 | 0 | 0 | 6.3 | 13.1 | 5,508 | +0.2% |
| Liberal Democrats | 1 | 0 | 2 | -2 | 6.3 | 10.1 | 4,234 | -2.4% |
| UKIP | 0 | 0 | 0 | 0 | 0 | 18.1 | 7,628 | +18.1% |
| Green | 0 | 0 | 0 | 0 | 0 | 5.7 | 2,418 | -2.3% |
| BNP | 0 | 0 | 0 | 0 | 0 | 0.5 | 202 | -0.4% |
| TUSC | 0 | 0 | 0 | 0 | 0 | 0.4 | 168 | +0.4% |

== Ward results ==
Billinge and Seneley Green
| Party | Candidate | Votes | % | ±% |
|---|---|---|---|---|
| Labour | Sue Murphy | 1,443 | 47.6 | −15.7 |
| UKIP | Peter Peers | 873 | 28.8 | +28.8 |
| Conservative | Wally Ashcroft | 433 | 14.3 | −4.5 |
| Green | Sue Rahman | 157 | 5.2 | +0.3 |
| Liberal Democrats | Frederick Barrett | 64 | 2.1 | +2.1 |
| BNP | Alan Brindle | 64 | 2.1 | +2.1 |
| Majority | | 570 | 18.8 | −25.6 |
| Turnout | | 3,034 | 34.3 | +2.5 |
| Labour hold | | Swing | | |

Blackbrook
| Party | Candidate | Votes | % | ±% |
|---|---|---|---|---|
| Labour | Paul McQuade | 1,562 | 62.2 | −15.4 |
| UKIP | Jean Denny | 626 | 24.9 | +24.9 |
| Conservative | Judith Collins | 179 | 7.1 | −2.9 |
| Liberal Democrats | Brian Bonney | 145 | 5.8 | +5.8 |
| Majority | | 936 | 37.3 | −27.9 |
| Turnout | | 2,512 | 30.4 | −0.4 |
| Labour hold | | Swing | | |

Bold
| Party | Candidate | Votes | % | ±% |
|---|---|---|---|---|
| Labour | Gareth Cross | 1,224 | 56.7 | −17.6 |
| UKIP | Nicholas Bartlett | 497 | 23.0 | +23.0 |
| Conservative | Barbara Woodcock | 179 | 8.3 | +1.4 |
| Green | Dave Parr | 139 | 6.4 | −2.0 |
| Liberal Democrats | Marise Roberts | 119 | 5.5 | −5.0 |
| Majority | | 727 | 33.7 | −30.1 |
| Turnout | | 2,158 | 28.7 | +1.7 |
| Labour hold | | Swing | | |

Earlestown
| Party | Candidate | Votes | % | ±% |
|---|---|---|---|---|
| Labour | Dave Banks | 1,559 | 69.0 | −3.1 |
| Conservative | Elizabeth Black | 264 | 11.7 | +2.3 |
| Green | Elizabeth Ward | 253 | 11.2 | +2.9 |
| Liberal Democrats | Peter Astbury | 183 | 8.1 | −2.2 |
| Majority | | 1,295 | 57.3 | −4.5 |
| Turnout | | 2,259 | 27.5 | −0.7 |
| Labour hold | | Swing | | |

Eccleston
| Party | Candidate | Votes | % | ±% |
|---|---|---|---|---|
| Liberal Democrats | Geoff Pearl | 1,630 | 47.4 | −4.6 |
| Labour | Paul Roberts | 762 | 22.2 | −7.6 |
| UKIP | Laurence Allen | 520 | 15.1 | +15.1 |
| Conservative | Robert Reynolds | 340 | 9.9 | +0.2 |
| Green | Andrew Brownlow | 186 | 5.4 | −3.2 |
| Majority | | 868 | 25.2 | +3.0 |
| Turnout | | 3,438 | 37.1 | −3.5 |
| Liberal Democrats hold | | Swing | | |

Haydock
| Party | Candidate | Votes | % | ±% |
|---|---|---|---|---|
| Labour | Bill Anderton | 1,542 | 60.0 | −18.6 |
| UKIP | Philip Wrigley | 592 | 23.0 | +23.0 |
| Conservative | Mark Collins | 259 | 10.1 | −1.3 |
| Green | Paul Finnigan | 128 | 5.0 | −5.0 |
| TUSC | Sean Marsh | 51 | 2.0 | +2.0 |
| Majority | | 950 | 36.9 | −30.3 |
| Turnout | | 2,572 | 28.6 | −1.4 |
| Labour hold | | Swing | | |

Moss Bank
| Party | Candidate | Votes | % | ±% |
|---|---|---|---|---|
| Labour | Jeffrey Fletcher | 1,445 | 51.5 | −2.4 |
| UKIP | Pat Shannon | 680 | 24.2 | +24.2 |
| Liberal Democrats | David Kent | 263 | 9.4 | +9.4 |
| Conservative | Margaret Harvey | 234 | 8.3 | +4.5 |
| Green | Brian Hart | 184 | 6.6 | +1.8 |
| Majority | | 765 | 27.3 | +11.0 |
| Turnout | | 2,806 | 33.4 | −1.6 |
| Labour hold | | Swing | | |

Newton
| Party | Candidate | Votes | % | ±% |
|---|---|---|---|---|
| Labour | Jeanie Bell | 1,237 | 44.9 | −1.9 |
| Liberal Democrats | David Smith | 978 | 35.5 | −7.9 |
| Conservative | Brian Honey | 322 | 11.7 | +6.3 |
| Green | Ann Shacklady-Smith | 216 | 7.8 | +3.4 |
| Majority | | 259 | 9.4 | +6.1 |
| Turnout | | 2,753 | 31.8 | −4.3 |
| Labour gain from Liberal Democrats | | Swing | | |

Parr
| Party | Candidate | Votes | % | ±% |
|---|---|---|---|---|
| Labour | Terry Shields | 1,444 | 70.9 | −13.3 |
| UKIP | Mark Hitchen | 497 | 24.4 | +24.4 |
| Conservative | Pat Wilcock | 95 | 4.7 | +0.7 |
| Majority | | 947 | 46.5 | −31.4 |
| Turnout | | 2,036 | 23.8 | +2.8 |
| Labour hold | | Swing | | |

Rainford
| Party | Candidate | Votes | % | ±% |
|---|---|---|---|---|
| Conservative | Linda Mussell | 1,312 | 53.5 | −0.2 |
| Labour | Keith Aspinall | 836 | 34.1 | −4.0 |
| Green | Ian Fraser | 188 | 7.7 | −0.5 |
| TUSC | Tracy Heaton | 117 | 4.8 | +4.8 |
| Majority | | 476 | 19.4 | +3.8 |
| Turnout | | 2,453 | 37.5 | −1.0 |
| Conservative hold | | Swing | | |

Rainhill
| Party | Candidate | Votes | % | ±% |
|---|---|---|---|---|
| Labour | Stephen Glover | 1,612 | 52.3 | −14.8 |
| Conservative | Katie Smith | 700 | 22.7 | +0.7 |
| UKIP | Daniel Guest | 560 | 18.2 | +18.2 |
| Green | Ian Donnelly | 211 | 6.8 | −4.2 |
| Majority | | 912 | 29.6 | −15.5 |
| Turnout | | 3,083 | 34.4 | −0.6 |
| Labour hold | | Swing | | |

Sutton
| Party | Candidate | Votes | % | ±% |
|---|---|---|---|---|
| Labour | Pat Jackson | 1,418 | 50.8 | −8.9 |
| UKIP | John Fairhurst | 607 | 21.7 | +21.7 |
| Liberal Democrats | Steph Topping | 545 | 19.5 | −11.0 |
| Conservative | Daniel Whitehouse | 145 | 5.2 | +3.1 |
| Green | Alexander Brodie | 78 | 2.8 | −0.8 |
| Majority | | 811 | 29.0 | −0.2 |
| Turnout | | 2,793 | 31.6 | −0.9 |
| Labour gain from Liberal Democrats | | Swing | | |

Thatto Heath
| Party | Candidate | Votes | % | ±% |
|---|---|---|---|---|
| Labour | Richard McCauley | 1,510 | 61.3 | −13.5 |
| UKIP | Alan Dutton | 483 | 19.6 | +19.6 |
| Conservative | Anthony Rigby | 194 | 7.9 | +0.7 |
| Green | Karen Atherton | 140 | 5.7 | −1.8 |
| Liberal Democrats | Carol Pearl | 85 | 3.5 | −1.5 |
| BNP | Paul Telford | 51 | 2.1 | −3.4 |
| Majority | | 1,027 | 41.7 | −25.6 |
| Turnout | | 2,463 | 25.8 | +0.1 |
| Labour hold | | Swing | | |

Town Centre
| Party | Candidate | Votes | % | ±% |
|---|---|---|---|---|
| Labour | Lisa Preston | 1,470 | 59.7 | −10.6 |
| UKIP | John Beirne | 667 | 27.1 | +27.1 |
| Conservative | Nancy Ashcroft | 131 | 5.3 | +0.5 |
| Green | Freda Brodie | 107 | 4.3 | −0.2 |
| BNP | Peter Clayton | 87 | 3.5 | −2.6 |
| Majority | | 803 | 32.6 | −26.5 |
| Turnout | | 2,462 | 31.3 | +5.4 |
| Labour hold | | Swing | | |

West Park
| Party | Candidate | Votes | % | ±% |
|---|---|---|---|---|
| Labour | Marie Rimmer | 1,693 | 61.7 | −11.8 |
| UKIP | Paul Bosworth | 528 | 19.2 | +19.2 |
| Conservative | Henry Spriggs | 220 | 8.0 | −1.1 |
| Green | Alison Donnelly | 192 | 7.0 | −3.5 |
| Liberal Democrats | Ruth Watmough | 113 | 4.1 | −2.7 |
| Majority | | 1,165 | 42.4 | −20.5 |
| Turnout | | 2,746 | 31.9 | +1.3 |
| Labour hold | | Swing | | |

Windle
| Party | Candidate | Votes | % | ±% |
|---|---|---|---|---|
| Labour | Lynn Glover | 1,204 | 47.2 | −9.7 |
| Conservative | John Cunliffe | 501 | 19.6 | −8.0 |
| UKIP | Maria Parr | 498 | 19.5 | +19.5 |
| Green | Francis Williams | 239 | 9.4 | −6.1 |
| Liberal Democrats | Noreen Knowles | 109 | 4.3 | +4.3 |
| Majority | | 703 | 27.6 | −1.7 |
| Turnout | | 2,551 | 31.8 | +1.0 |
| Labour hold | | Swing | | |
