= Marie Rimmer =

British Labour politician

Marie Rimmer CBE MP
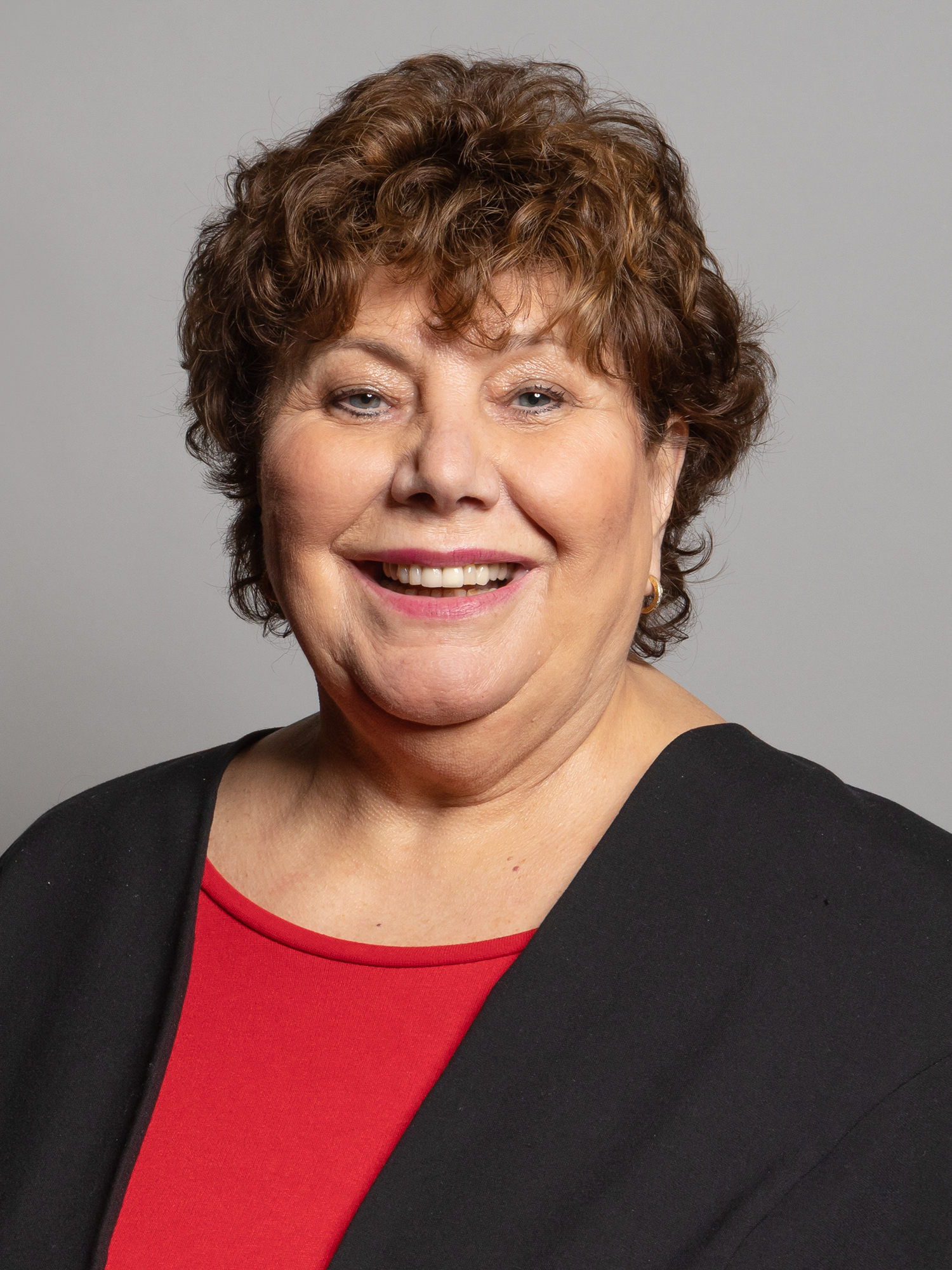
- Official portrait, 2020

Opposition Whip
- In office 14 April 2020 – 4 December 2021
- Leader: Keir Starmer

Shadow Minister for Disabled People
- In office 1 February 2017 – 9 October 2017
- Leader: Jeremy Corbyn
- Preceded by: Debbie Abrahams
- Succeeded by: Marsha de Cordova

Member of Parliament for St Helens South and Whiston
- Incumbent
- Assumed office 7 May 2015
- Preceded by: Shaun Woodward
- Majority: 11,945 (31.4%)

Personal details
- Born: 27 April 1947 (age 79)
- Party: Labour
- Website: Official website

Marie Elizabeth Rimmer, CBE (born 27 April 1947) is a British Labour Party politician who has been the Member of Parliament (MP) for St Helens South and Whiston since 2015.

She has previously been a local councillor for St Helens Metropolitan Borough Council in Merseyside, England, and has served as Labour leader of the council three times between 1978 and 2014.

== Early life and career ==
Marie Rimmer was born on 27 April 1947, and grew up in St Helens. After she left school, she worked at the Pilkington Glass manufacturing plant, first as a comptometer operator, and later as a buyer for the engineering division.

== Political career ==
Rimmer first became a Labour local councillor for St Helens in 1978. In 1985, she became Labour leader of the council. In 1986, Rimmer debated against an unfriendly take-over bid for Pilkington from BTR Industries, arguing that the loss of local control of the company would greatly harm St Helens. BTR withdrew its offer the same year. In 1993, Rimmer stepped down as Labour leader of the council and returned to Pilkington Glass as a health and safety advisor, until retiring from the position following the 1999 St Helens Metropolitan Borough Council election, where she became Labour leader of the council for the second time.

Prior to the 2001 general election, Rimmer was blocked from being shortlisted for St Helens South and Whiston by Labour's National Executive Committee, amidst accusations of a "stitch-up" to parachute Shaun Woodward into the seat, as he was unlikely to win his Witney seat which he had won in 1997 as a Conservative. Labour officials refused to disclose reasons why Rimmer had been excluded from the shortlist, and despite being noted as a local favourite, Rimmer insisted that, despite her exclusion, she was not angry and that she "...did not come into politics to be angry".

In the 2004 St Helens Metropolitan Borough Council election, Rimmer held her seat in West Park after 3 recounts, however the Labour council lost its majority and lost overall control of the council to no overall control. In the same year, Rimmer was a board member of the Northwest Development Agency (NWDA), a regional development agency for the North West England. In July, Rimmer and the St Helens Council backed the plans for the construction for a new stadium for St Helens R.F.C. as part of a £100m leisure complex. She was appointed Commander of the Order of the British Empire (CBE) in the 2005 Birthday Honours for services to local government.

In 2006, police investigated Rimmer for allegations that she had spent £1,000 more than what was allowed in her ward during May's local elections, breaking rules governing election campaign expenses. The original complaints originated from a member of the now defunct Community Action Party, Eric Guest. The Labour Party called the allegations 'spurious and malicious.'

Rimmer became leader of the council for a third time following the 2010 St Helens Metropolitan Borough Council election. She criticised the then outgoing administration, led by Liberal Democrats leader Brian Spencer, for driving people away from the town centre after their implementation of car parking charges in some areas of St Helens. In 2011, Rimmer opposed plans to introduce the Metro Mayor of the Liverpool City Region, stating that "St Helens has a long and proud tradition of helping to support the sub region economy by working closely with our colleagues. I do not believe that investing power in one individual is the right thing to do."

Her leadership ended following the 2014 St Helens Metropolitan Borough Council election where despite winning a large Labour majority, Rimmer was replaced by her deputy, Barrie Grunewald, in May 2013 after a 22 to 18 vote of the Labour group on the council.

On the day of the Scottish independence referendum in 2014, an incident at a polling station in Shettleston, Glasgow, led to Rimmer's arrest and being charged with assault. Rimmer's case was later found not proven at Glasgow Sheriff Court in November 2016.

== Parliamentary career ==
In April 2014, Rimmer was picked from an all-women shortlist as Labour's candidate for St Helens South and Whiston. At the 2015 general election, Rimmer was elected to Parliament as MP for St Helens South and Whiston with 59.8% of the vote and a majority of 21,243.

Initially supporting Yvette Cooper, she supported Owen Smith in the 2016 Labour leadership election.

In the 2016 United Kingdom European Union membership referendum, Rimmer voted remain.

Following the murder of Jo Cox, Rimmer was among 20 MP's, and musicians including Ricky Wilson, MP4, and Royal Opera House Thurrock Community Chorus, to record a charity single in November 2016 covering The Rolling Stones' You Can't Always Get What You Want.

Rimmer was appointed Shadow Minister for Disabled People on 1 February 2017 but decided to step down from the role in October the same year.

At the snap 2017 general election, Rimmer was re-elected as MP for St Helens South and Whiston with an increased vote share of 67.8% and an increased majority of 24,343. She was again re-elected at the 2019 general election, with a decreased vote share of 58.5% and a decreased majority of 19,122.

Rimmer endorsed Keir Starmer in the 2020 Labour Party leadership election.

On 14 April 2020, she was appointed as an opposition whip, a position she held until 4 December 2021.

At the 2024 general election, Rimmer was again re-elected with a decreased vote share of 49.7% and a decreased majority of 11,945.

== Personal life ==
Rimmer has a sister, Marlene Mary Quinn, who also ran as a councillor in St Helens as recently as 2019.

Parliament of the United Kingdom
Preceded by Shaun Woodward	Member of Parliament for St Helens South and Whiston; 2015–present	Incumbent
