= 2007 St Helens Metropolitan Borough Council election =

Council election in Merseyside, England

Map of the results of the 2007 St Helens Metropolitan Borough Council election. Liberal Democrats in yellow, Labour in red and Conservatives in blue.

The 2007 St Helens Metropolitan Borough Council election took place on 3 May 2007 to elect members of St Helens Metropolitan Borough Council in Merseyside, England. One third of the council was up for election and the council stayed under no overall control.

After the election, the composition of the council was

- Labour 21
- Liberal Democrats 20
- Conservative 6
- Independent 1

== Background ==
After the last election in 2006, Labour were the largest party with 23 councillors, compared to 19 for the Liberal Democrats and 6 for the Conservatives. However following the election the Liberal Democrats and Conservatives reached an agreement to run the council together. In June 2006 2 Labour councillors, Bessie Griffin and Pat Robinson, left the party to sit as independent councillors, with Pat Robinson going on to join the Liberal Democrats early in 2007. This meant that before the 2007 election Labour had 21 seats, the Liberal Democrats had 19, the Conservatives 6, there was 1 independent and 1 seat was vacant, after the retirement of Liberal Democrat councillor Julie Jones.

17 seats were contested at the election, including 2 seats in Sutton, with both Labour and the Liberal Democrats defending 7, the Conservatives defended 2 seats, and 1 former Liberal Democrat seat was vacant. Key seats were expected before the election to be in Bold, Haydock, Town Centre and West Park wards. Candidates at the election included four from the British National Party, up from one in 2006, while a former Labour leader of the council in the 1980s, Brian Green, stood for the Community Action Party in Bold.

== Election result ==
The Labour and Liberal Democrat parties both gained 2 seats from each other to leave the party balance on the council unchanged. Labour gained seats from the Liberal Democrats in Thatto Heath and West Park to leave Labour on 21 seats, with the winner in West Park, Marlene Quinn, being the sister of the Labour group leader Marie Rimmer. However the Liberal Democrats took seats in Haydock and Town Centre from Labour to leave them just one seat behind Labour with 20 councillors. Meanwhile, the Conservatives held the 2 seats they had been defending to remain with 6 seats and the only independent councillor was not defending their seat in 2007.

Following the election the independent councillor Bessie Griffin joined the Liberal Democrats, which meant both the Labour and Liberal Democrat groups had 21 seats. The Liberal Democrats and Conservatives continued to run the council, after agreeing to renew their pact.

St Helens local election result 2007
Party	Seats	Gains	Losses	Net gain/loss	Seats %	Votes %	Votes	+/−
Liberal Democrats	8	2	2	0	47.1	41.4	19,781	+1.8%
Labour	7	2	2	0	41.2	37.7	18,030	-2.7%
Conservative	2	0	0	0	11.8	17.0	8,146	-0.3%
BNP	0	0	0	0	0	1.8	879	+1.1%
Community Action	0	0	0	0	0	1.2	561	-0.7%
Community Performance First	0	0	0	0	0	0.7	313	+0.7%
Green	0	0	0	0	0	0.2	110	+0.2%

== Ward results ==
Billinge and Seneley Green
Party	Candidate	Votes	%	±%
Labour	Joe Pearson	1,321	42.5	−5.3
Conservative	Michael Hodgson	922	29.7	−1.1
Liberal Democrats	Charles Gadsden	551	17.7	−3.7
Community Performance First	Vinny Kay	313	10.1	+10.1
Majority		399	12.8	−4.2
Turnout		3,107	34.0	−0.8
Labour hold		Swing		

Blackbrook
Party	Candidate	Votes	%	±%
Labour	Linda Maloney	1,266	63.7	+15.0
Liberal Democrats	Ruth Smith	299	15.0	−12.6
Conservative	Judith Collins	259	13.0	+4.4
Community Action	Janet Smee	164	8.2	−4.5
Majority		967	48.6	+27.5
Turnout		1,988	28.9	−1.4
Labour hold		Swing		

Bold
Party	Candidate	Votes	%	±%
Liberal Democrats	Stephen Topping	933	43.9	−4.8
Labour	Charlie Preston	911	42.9	−2.0
Conservative	Charmian Pyke	165	7.8	+1.4
Community Action	Brian Green	117	5.5	+5.5
Majority		22	1.0	−2.8
Turnout		2,126	28.7	−2.2
Liberal Democrats hold		Swing		

Earlestown
Party	Candidate	Votes	%	±%
Labour	Keith Deakin	1,090	44.8	−3.8
Liberal Democrats	David Smith	1,000	41.1	+0.9
Conservative	Brian Honey	234	9.6	−1.6
Green	Andie Pennington	110	4.5	+4.5
Majority		90	3.7	−4.7
Turnout		2,434	30.2	+0.5
Labour hold		Swing		

Eccleston
Party	Candidate	Votes	%	±%
Liberal Democrats	Shirley Evans	2,696	69.8	+2.5
Conservative	Kathleen Barton	587	15.2	−2.2
Labour	Lynn Glover	577	14.9	−0.4
Majority		2,109	54.6	+4.8
Turnout		3,860	41.4	−1.4
Liberal Democrats hold		Swing		

Haydock
Party	Candidate	Votes	%	±%
Liberal Democrats	Janet Sheldon	1,820	59.6	+4.5
Labour	Ken Cleary	1,022	33.5	−5.6
Conservative	Anthony Rigby	211	6.9	+1.1
Majority		798	26.1	+10.1
Turnout		3,053	33.6	−2.9
Liberal Democrats gain from Labour		Swing		

Moss Bank
Party	Candidate	Votes	%	±%
Liberal Democrats	Anne Heyes	1,707	54.2	+1.9
Labour	Roy Litherland	1,189	37.7	−2.5
Conservative	William Highcock	254	8.1	+0.6
Majority		518	16.4	+4.3
Turnout		3,150	35.8	−0.3
Liberal Democrats hold		Swing		

Newton
Party	Candidate	Votes	%	±%
Liberal Democrats	Peter Astbury	2,003	69.7	+5.6
Labour	Louise Hazelby	613	21.3	−5.8
Conservative	Margaret Harvey	257	8.9	+0.1
Majority		1,390	48.4	+11.4
Turnout		2,873	34.9	+0.3
Liberal Democrats hold		Swing		

Parr
Party	Candidate	Votes	%	±%
Labour	Keith Roberts	1,379	69.2	+3.2
Liberal Democrats	Gary Pulfer	466	23.4	−5.0
Conservative	Madeleine Wilcock	148	7.4	+1.8
Majority		913	45.8	+8.2
Turnout		1,993	23.2	−2.4
Labour hold		Swing		

Rainford
Party	Candidate	Votes	%	±%
Conservative	David Grice	2,099	71.7	+11.8
Labour	David Wood	634	21.7	−5.8
Liberal Democrats	Frederick Barret	194	6.6	−6.1
Majority		1,465	50.1	+17.7
Turnout		2,927	42.9	+0.2
Conservative hold		Swing		

Rainhill
Party	Candidate	Votes	%	±%
Labour	Joseph De Asha	1,508	45.9	−0.2
Conservative	Henry Spriggs	872	26.5	−3.8
Liberal Democrats	Christina Duncan	629	19.1	−4.5
BNP	Frances Chesney	278	8.5	+8.5
Majority		636	19.3	+3.5
Turnout		3,287	35.8	+1.1
Labour hold		Swing		

Sutton (2 seats)
Party	Candidate	Votes	%	±%
Liberal Democrats	Kenneth Knowles	2,198		
Liberal Democrats	Stephanie Topping	1,797		
Labour	Mike Glover	817		
Labour	Derek Maylor	747		
Conservative	Barbara Johnson	225		
Turnout		5,784	30.3	+4.7
Liberal Democrats hold		Swing		
Liberal Democrats hold		Swing		

Thatto Heath
Party	Candidate	Votes	%	±%
Labour	Patricia Martinez-Williams	1,274	48.3	−7.6
Liberal Democrats	Patricia Robinson	794	30.1	+10.7
Conservative	Barbara Woodcock	201	7.6	−1.7
BNP	Damian Smith	187	7.1	+7.1
Community Action	Michael Perry	180	6.8	−8.7
Majority		480	18.2	−18.3
Turnout		2,636	29.2	+2.5
Labour gain from Liberal Democrats		Swing		

Town Centre
Party	Candidate	Votes	%	±%
Liberal Democrats	Janet Hennessy	1,099	45.2	+4.2
Labour	Martin Bond	959	39.4	+0.2
BNP	Kevin Devine	194	8.0	−4.0
Conservative	Jill Jones	129	5.3	+0.9
Community Action	Leslie Teeling	50	2.1	−1.4
Majority		140	5.8	+4.0
Turnout		2,431	29.5	−1.8
Liberal Democrats gain from Labour		Swing		

West Park
Party	Candidate	Votes	%	±%
Labour	Marlene Quinn	1,741	52.2	+0.4
Liberal Democrats	David Evans	1,150	34.5	−4.8
BNP	Eric Swindells	220	6.6	+6.6
Conservative	Richard Barton	174	5.2	−0.5
Community Action	Tracy Lavelle	50	1.5	−1.7
Majority		591	17.7	+5.2
Turnout		3,335	37.1	−4.5
Labour gain from Liberal Democrats		Swing		

Windle
Party	Candidate	Votes	%	±%
Conservative	Nancy Ashcroft	1,409	49.7	+0.8
Labour	Geoffrey Almond	982	34.6	+0.6
Liberal Democrats	Noreen Knowles	445	15.7	−1.3
Majority		427	15.1	+0.2
Turnout		2,836	35.2	−1.3
Conservative hold		Swing		
