= Listed buildings in Eccleston, St Helens =

Eccleston is a civil parish in St Helens, Merseyside, England. It contains eight buildings that are recorded in the National Heritage List for England as designated listed buildings. Of these, four are listed at Grade II*, the middle of the three grades, and the others are at Grade II, the lowest grade.

The parish is partly residential, and partly rural. The major building in the parish is Scholes House. This is listed, as are two associated structures. The other listed buildings consist of a house, a farmhouse, a church, a bridge and a war memorial.

== Key ==
Grade	Criteria
II*	Particularly important buildings of more than special interest
II	Buildings of national importance and special interest

== Buildings ==
Name and location	Photograph	Date	Notes	Grade
Scholes House; 53.43481°N 2.76952°W	—	1681	The house contains earlier fabric, and has been much altered since. It is in stone, and some of its windows are mullioned. The entrance porch has Elizabethan moulding, and a four-centred arch.	II*
Rainford Farmhouse; 53.45257°N 2.79864°W	—	1690	A stone house with a slate roof. It is in two storeys with a three-bay front. Most of the windows are modern casements in stone frames.	II
Effigy pedestal, Scholes House; 53.43459°N 2.76953°W	—	Early 18th century	In the garden of Scholes House is a Doric pillar, at the top of which is a niche for an image. It is thought that this was taken from a wayside cross.	II*
Packhorse bridge 53.42419°N 2.76986°W	—	c. 1759	The former packhorse bridge crosses Pendlebury Brook. It is in red sandstone, and consists of a single segmental arch with curved southern abutments. The eastern arch has a keystone, and the western arch is recessed under an archivolt. The parapets are low and rounded, and one of the voussoirs is inscribed with initials and the date.	II
130–132 Portico Lane; 53.43281°N 2.77810°W	—	c. 1800	Originally a watchmaker's cottage and workshop, later divided into two dwellings. It is in brick with a slate roof, in two storeys with a three-bay front, and a lean-to workshop extension to the left. At the rear are two single-bay projections. On the left side is a large 32-pane window.	II
Christ Church; 53.45424°N 2.77782°W		1836–38	The church was designed by Samuel Taylor, it is in sandstone with a Welsh slate roof. The church consists of a nave, transepts, a chancel with a south vestry, and a west steeple. The steeple has a three-stage tower and a recessed spire. The windows are lancets, and at the east end is a triple lancet window flanked by octagonal battlemented turrets with small spires.	II
War memorial 53.43391°N 2.79347°W		c. 1920	The war memorial was designed by Walter Gilbert and Louis Weingartener in Portland stone and bronze. A square pedestal stands on a base of three square steps. On the top is the sculpture of a soldier holding binoculars and a revolver, and at the base is a woman holding a laurel garland.	II*
Ruins, Scholes House; 53.43491°N 2.76935°W	—	Undated	The ruins are those of a former friary.	II*
