= Samuel Cheetham =

Samuel Cheetham may refer to:

- Samuel Cheetham (footballer) (1896–?), English professional footballer
- Samuel Cheetham (priest) (1827–1908), Anglican priest
