= Shaun Woodward =

British politician

The Right Honourable Shaun Woodward
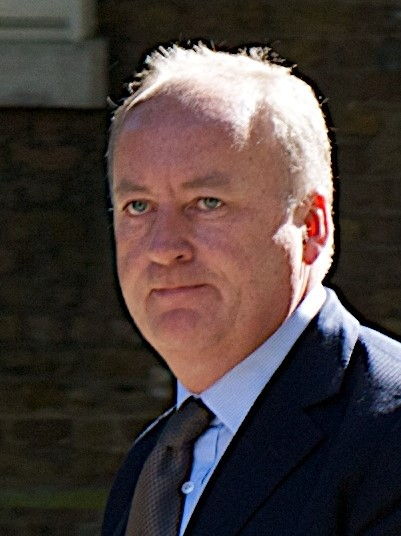
- Woodward in 2009

Secretary of State for Northern Ireland
- In office 28 June 2007 – 11 May 2010
- Prime Minister: Gordon Brown
- Preceded by: Peter Hain
- Succeeded by: Owen Paterson

Parliamentary Under-Secretary of State for Creative Industries and Tourism
- In office 10 May 2006 – 28 June 2007
- Prime Minister: Tony Blair
- Preceded by: James Purnell
- Succeeded by: Margaret Hodge

Parliamentary Under-Secretary of State for Northern Ireland
- In office 6 May 2005 – 10 May 2006
- Prime Minister: Tony Blair
- Preceded by: Barry Gardiner
- Succeeded by: Maria Eagle

Member of Parliament
- In office 1 May 1997 – 7 June 2001
- Preceded by: Douglas Hurd
- Succeeded by: David Cameron
- Constituency: Witney
- In office 7 June 2001 – 7 May 2015
- Preceded by: Gerry Bermingham
- Succeeded by: Marie Rimmer
- Constituency: St Helens South (2001–2010); St Helens South and Whiston (2010–2015)

Shadow Secretary of State for Northern Ireland
- In office 11 May 2010 – 7 October 2011
- Leader: Harriet Harman; Ed Miliband
- Preceded by: Owen Paterson
- Succeeded by: Vernon Coaker

Personal details
- Born: Shaun Anthony Woodward; 26 October 1958 (age 67) Bristol, England
- Party: Labour (since 1999)
- Other political affiliations: Conservative (before 1999)
- Spouse: Camilla Sainsbury (m. 1987; sep. 2015)
- Domestic partner: Luke Redgrave
- Children: 4 (including Ella)
- Education: Jesus College, Cambridge; Harvard University

Shaun Anthony Woodward (born 26 October 1958) is a British Labour Party (UK) politician who served as Secretary of State for Northern Ireland from 2007 to 2010.

A former television researcher and producer, Woodward began his political career in the Conservative Party. He was elected in 1997 as Conservative MP for Witney, but joined Labour in 1999. He then served as Labour MP for St Helens South from 2001 to 2015.

After serving in junior ministerial offices in the Northern Ireland Office and Department for Culture, Media and Sport, Woodward served in the cabinet from 28 June 2007 to 11 May 2010 as Secretary of State for Northern Ireland. Following the 2010 general election, Woodward was the Shadow Secretary of State for Northern Ireland until 7 October 2011, when he was replaced by Vernon Coaker.

== Early life and education ==
Woodward was educated at Bristol Grammar School, at the time a direct grant grammar school, and now an independent day school, followed by Jesus College, Cambridge, where he studied English literature. He also studied at Harvard University as a Kennedy Scholar. From 1981 to 1982, he was parliamentary lobbyist for the National Consumer Council. From 1982 to 1990, he worked as a researcher and producer for BBC TV News and Current Affairs on the programmes That's Life!, Panorama and Newsnight. He subsequently wrote a book about Ben Hardwick, Britain's youngest liver transplant patient who had been a subject of That's Life!. From 1991 to 1992, he was director of communications for the Conservative Party.

== Member of Parliament ==
Woodward was selected as Douglas Hurd's successor as Conservative candidate for the safe seat of Witney at the 1997 election, having previously been a senior official of the party. Hurd's majority from the previous election was over 22,000. Elected with a 7,000 majority, he was a front-bench spokesman on London for the Conservative opposition under William Hague until 1999, when he was sacked for supporting the repeal of Section 28, a regulation which aimed at preventing the promotion of homosexuality in schools.

=== Defection to the Labour Party ===
After being sacked from the Tory front bench, on 20 December 1999, Woodward left the Conservative Party to move to the ruling Labour Party, without resigning as an MP. This meant that no by-election took place. He was given a job co-ordinating the Labour party's 2001 general election campaign. Woodward's local Conservative constituency association requested that he resign and run again in a by-election, under the Labour banner, as he had originally won the safe Conservative seat by campaigning as a Conservative. Woodward refused to hold a by-election, and continued to represent Witney for a further eighteen months.

Woodward was criticised by his former colleagues in the Conservative Party, including leader William Hague, Conservative former Deputy Prime Minister Michael Heseltine and party chairman Michael Ancram. Other critics included backbench Labour MPs Tony Benn and Jeremy Corbyn, and ten years later, former Labour government minister Chris Mullin, in his political diaries.

Michael Heseltine said Woodward would "soon become a dot on the horizon", whilst Conservative leader William Hague wrote a public letter to Woodward on his resignation, in which he stated: "You have left a party whose members have given you their loyal support. You have done so for reasons not of integrity or of principle, but for your own careerist reasons. That is an attitude of which I am determined to rid our party..." Conservative chairman Michael Ancram said: "Shaun has decided for his own reasons to leave the party and no amount of sincerity or fake sincerity is going to hide that fact..."

Woodward's defection was welcomed by senior Labour figures.

In the June 2001 general election, Woodward decided not to contest his Witney seat as a Labour candidate and instead found a safe Labour seat in St Helens South. Chris Mullin wrote with shock of "the awful Shaun Woodward" defecting to Mullin's own side, calling "the New Labour elite parachuting [Woodward] into a safe seat ... one of New Labour's vilest stitch-ups ... made my flesh creep". His successor in Witney was David Cameron, who subsequently became Prime Minister in 2010.

When news of Woodward's intention to stand reached St. Helens, a strong left-wing challenge was put forward in an attempt to deny the former Conservative the safe Labour seat. Neil Thompson of the Socialist Alliance and Michael Perry of the Socialist Labour Party both contested the St Helens South seat and received a total of 12% of the vote between them. Woodward won the seat with a much reduced 49% of the vote.

As a Labour MP, Woodward served on the Joint Committee on Human Rights, and was a prominent supporter of the Gender Recognition Act 2004.

In May 2005, Woodward was re-elected in St Helens South receiving 54% of the vote and his majority increased. However, the Liberal Democrats' candidate, Brian Spencer, saw his party's share of the vote increase from 23% in 2001 to 28%. Michael Perry of the Socialist Labour Party contested the seat again and received just under 2% of the vote.

=== In government ===
Following the 2005 election, Woodward was appointed Parliamentary under-secretary of state at the Northern Ireland Office.

In the May 2006 reshuffle, Tony Blair named Woodward Parliamentary Under-Secretary of State at the Department for Culture, Media and Sport with responsibilities for the digital switchover for TV. On 28 June 2007, in his first cabinet, newly appointed Prime Minister Gordon Brown appointed Woodward as the Northern Ireland Secretary, replacing Peter Hain. Woodward chose not to receive a ministerial salary because of his personal wealth. As Northern Ireland Secretary, Woodward reportedly became a close confidant of the Prime Minister, Gordon Brown. This was largely due to Woodward's previous first hand experiences of the beleaguered Conservative government of John Major.

=== In Opposition ===
Woodward stood for election to Labour's shadow cabinet, but was unsuccessful. Nevertheless, he was retained as Shadow Secretary of State for Northern Ireland by Labour leader Ed Miliband for just under a year.

In November 2013 he announced that he would stand down from Parliament at the next general election, to work on human rights issues. He was praised for his role by then Labour leader, Ed Miliband, who wrote to him: "In 1999, you made an incredibly hard decision to cross the floor of the House and join the Labour party. It took personal courage and political commitment, and our party will forever be grateful to you."

== Personal life ==
He married Camilla Davan Sainsbury, daughter of former Conservative MP Tim Sainsbury of the wealthy supermarket Sainsbury family, on 2 May 1987; they announced their separation after 28 years on 20 December 2015. They have one son and three daughters, including the food blogger Ella Mills.

His current partner is Hollywood camera operator Luke Redgrave.

In March 2001, he was said to be the only Labour MP with a butler.

Woodward is chair of the board of trustees at the Human Dignity Trust and the London Academy of Music and Dramatic Art (LAMDA). He is a member of the board of directors at the Hamptons International Film Festival.

== Works ==
- Death by Television by Esther Rantzen, Shaun Woodward (Century, 1999) ISBN 0-7126-2543-7
- Drugwatch: Just Say No! by Sarah Caplin, Shaun Woodward (Corgi, 1986) ISBN 0-552-12820-1
- Ben: Story of Ben Hardwick by Esther Rantzen, Shaun Woodward (Penguin Character Books, 1985) ISBN 0-563-20331-5
- "That's Life" Survey on Tranquillisers by Ron Lacey, Shaun Woodward (BBC, 1985) ISBN 0-563-20294-7

Parliament of the United Kingdom
Preceded by Douglas Hurd	Member of Parliament for Witney; 1997–2001	Succeeded by David Cameron
Preceded by Gerry Bermingham	Member of Parliament for St Helens South; 2001–2010	Constituency abolished
New constituency	Member of Parliament for St Helens South and Whiston; 2010–2015	Succeeded by Marie Rimmer
Political offices
Preceded by Peter Hain	Secretary of State for Northern Ireland; 2007–2010	Succeeded by Owen Paterson
Preceded by Owen Paterson	Shadow Secretary of State for Northern Ireland; 2010–2011	Succeeded by Vernon Coaker
