= Thatto Heath =

Area of St Helens, Merseyside, England

Coordinates: 53.4352°N 2.7481°W

- Location within Merseyside
- Population: 12,280 (2011.ward)
- OS grid reference: SJ484923
- Metropolitan borough: St Helens
- Metropolitan county: Merseyside
- Region: North West
- Country: England
- Sovereign state: United Kingdom
- Post town: ST HELENS
- Postcode district: WA9, WA10
- Dialling code: 01744
- Police: Merseyside
- Fire: Merseyside
- Ambulance: North West
- UK Parliament: St Helens South and Whiston

Thatto Heath is an area of St Helens, in Merseyside, England.

== Location ==
Historically in Lancashire, it lies approximately 6 miles (9.7 km) north-northwest of Widnes and about 12 miles (19 km) east of Liverpool city centre. The area is bordered by Eccleston, Rainhill, Ravenhead, Sutton and Windle.

== Population ==
The population of the ward at the 2011 census was 12,280.

== Politics ==
Thatto Heath is a ward of the Metropolitan Borough of St Helens.

The three elected councillors for Thatto Heath ward are Cllrs Nova Charlton, Robyn Hattersley and Richard McCaulley of the Labour Party.

== Transport ==
The area is served by Thatto Heath railway station, on the City Line between Liverpool and Wigan.

== Sport ==
Rugby League club Thatto Heath Crusaders currently compete in the National Conference League Division 1.

== Notable people ==
- Samuel Cheetham
- Roy Haggerty
- Alex Murphy (rugby league)
- Johnny Vegas
- Jacqui Abbott
- Bernie Clifton
- James Graham (rugby league)
