= 2006 St Helens Metropolitan Borough Council election =

2006 UK local government election

← 2004	4 May 2006	2007 →

16 of the 48 seats on St Helens Metropolitan Borough Council 25 seats needed for a majority
	First party	Second party	Third party
Party	Labour	Liberal Democrats	Conservative
Seats won	7	7	2
Seats after	23	19	6
Seat change	▼1	▲1	Steady
Popular vote	18,549	18,219	7,942
Percentage	40.3%	39.6%	17.3%
Swing	▲1.7%	▲2.3%	▼1.5%
- Map of the results of the 2006 St Helens Metropolitan Borough Council election. Labour in red, Liberal Democrats in yellow and Conservatives in blue.
Council control before election
No overall control
Council control after election
No overall control

The 2006 St Helens Metropolitan Borough Council election took place on 4 May 2006 to elect members of St Helens Metropolitan Borough Council in Merseyside, England. One third of the council was up for election and stayed under no overall control.

After the election, the composition of the council was:

- Labour 23
- Liberal Democrats 19
- Conservative 6

== Background ==
Before the election, the Labour Party needed to gain 1 seat to regain a majority on the council they had lost at the last election in 2004. Labour had 24 seats before the election, while the Liberal Democrats had 18 and the Conservatives had 6. However, labour was able to run the council as the Conservative mayor had agreed not to use her casting vote.

Among the councillors who were defending seats at the election was the Labour group leader Marie Rimmer in West Park ward, while the seat in Blackbrook was vacant after the death of Labour councillor Albert Smith earlier in 2006. 16 seats were up for election, and candidates from the three political parties who held seats on the council, there were also four candidates from the Community Action Party and one each from the British National Party and the Socialist Labour Party.

== Election result ==
Labour remained the largest party on the council but lost one seat to the Liberal Democrats, leaving the party with 23 councillors. The Liberal Democrat gain from Labour came in the Town Centre ward and moved them to 19 seats on the council. However, the Labour council leader, Marie Rimmer, held her seat in West Park with a 457-vote majority. Meanwhile, the Conservatives remained on 6 seats after holding the 2 seats they had been defending.

Following the election, Liberal Democrat Brian Spencer became the new leader of the council after an agreement between the Liberal Democrats and Conservatives, with the Liberal Democrats taking 5 of the seats on the cabinet and the Conservative group leader Wally Ashcroft taking the other seat. This came after Labour rejected proposals for all three parties to share power on the council, which meant Labour lost power after 70 years.

St Helens local election result 2006
Party	Seats	Gains	Losses	Net gain/loss	Seats %	Votes %	Votes	+/−
Labour	7	0	1	-1	43.8	40.4	18,549	+1.7
Liberal Democrats	7	1	0	+1	43.8	39.6	18,219	+2.3
Conservative	2	0	0	0	12.5	17.3	7,942	-1.5
Community Action	0	0	0	0	0.0	1.9	895	+1.9
BNP	0	0	0	0	0.0	0.7	308	+0.1
Socialist Labour	0	0	0	0	0.0	0.1	64	+0.1

== Ward results ==
Billinge and Seneley Green
Party	Candidate	Votes	%	±%
Labour	Susan Murphy	1,504	47.8	
Conservative	David Davies	970	30.8	
Liberal Democrats	Charles Gadsden	672	21.4	
Majority		534	17.0	
Turnout		3,146	34.8	−6.9
Labour hold		Swing		

Blackbrook
Party	Candidate	Votes	%	±%
Labour	Paul McQuade	1,257	48.7	
Liberal Democrats	Ruth Smith	712	27.6	
Community Action	William Guest	327	12.7	
Conservative	Judith Collins	221	8.6	
Socialist Labour	Ronald Waugh	64	2.5	
Majority		545	21.1	
Turnout		2,581	30.3	−5.6
Labour hold		Swing		

Bold
Party	Candidate	Votes	%	±%
Liberal Democrats	Matthew Dunn	1,087	48.7	
Labour	Paul Pritchard	1,001	44.9	
Conservative	Charmian Pyke	142	6.4	
Majority		86	3.8	
Turnout		2,230	30.9	−3.2
Liberal Democrats hold		Swing		

Earlestown
Party	Candidate	Votes	%	±%
Labour	Charles Banks	1,153	48.6	
Liberal Democrats	David Smith	953	40.2	
Conservative	Catherine Perks	266	11.2	
Majority		200	8.4	
Turnout		2,372	29.7	−3.8
Labour hold		Swing		

Eccleston
Party	Candidate	Votes	%	±%
Liberal Democrats	Geoffrey Pearl	2,666	67.3	
Conservative	Kathleen Barton	690	17.4	
Labour	Martin Bond	608	15.3	
Majority		1,976	49.8	
Turnout		3,964	42.8	−6.8
Liberal Democrats hold		Swing		

Haydock
Party	Candidate	Votes	%	±%
Liberal Democrats	Eric Sheldon	1,811	55.1	
Labour	Jeanette Banks	1,284	39.1	
Conservative	Anthony Rigby	189	5.8	
Majority		527	16.0	
Turnout		3,284	36.5	−1.2
Liberal Democrats hold		Swing		

Moss Bank
Party	Candidate	Votes	%	±%
Liberal Democrats	Richard Ferry	1,648	52.3	
Labour	Brian Hart	1,269	40.2	
Conservative	William Highcock	237	7.5	
Majority		379	12.1	
Turnout		3,154	36.1	−6.6
Liberal Democrats hold		Swing		

Newton
Party	Candidate	Votes	%	±%
Liberal Democrats	Neil Taylor	1,787	64.1	
Labour	Stuart Hughes	756	27.1	
Conservative	Margaret Harvey	244	8.8	
Majority		1,031	37.0	
Turnout		2,787	34.6	−6.0
Liberal Democrats hold		Swing		

Parr
Party	Candidate	Votes	%	±%
Labour	Terence Shields	1,384	66.0	
Liberal Democrats	Janet Hennessy	595	28.4	
Conservative	Madeleine Wilcock	117	5.6	
Majority		789	37.6	
Turnout		2,096	25.6	−4.6
Labour hold		Swing		

Rainford
Party	Candidate	Votes	%	±%
Conservative	John Parr	1,740	59.9	
Labour	David Wood	798	27.5	
Liberal Democrats	Sandra Ferry	369	12.7	
Majority		942	32.4	
Turnout		2,907	42.7	−8.3
Conservative hold		Swing		

Rainhill
Party	Candidate	Votes	%	±%
Labour	Stephen Glover	1,463	46.1	
Conservative	Henry Spriggs	961	30.3	
Liberal Democrats	Christina Duncan	749	23.6	
Majority		502	15.8	
Turnout		3,173	34.7	−7.4
Labour hold		Swing		

Sutton
Party	Candidate	Votes	%	±%
Liberal Democrats	Julie Jones	1,721	61.4	
Labour	Marlene Newman	873	31.2	
Conservative	Barbara Johnson	207	7.4	
Majority		848	30.2	
Turnout		2,801	25.6	−12.2
Liberal Democrats hold		Swing		

Thatto Heath
Party	Candidate	Votes	%	±%
Labour	Richard McCauley	1,308	55.9	
Liberal Democrats	Carol Pearl	453	19.4	
Community Action	Michael Perry	363	15.5	
Conservative	Barbara Woodcock	217	9.3	
Majority		855	36.5	
Turnout		2,341	26.7	−7.5
Labour hold		Swing		

Town Centre
Party	Candidate	Votes	%	±%
Liberal Democrats	David Crowther	1,052	41.0	
Labour	Margaret McLachlan	1,005	39.2	
BNP	Michael Pearcey	308	12.0	
Conservative	Jill Jones	113	4.4	
Community Action	Leslie Teeling	89	3.5	
Majority		47	1.8	
Turnout		2,567	31.3	−1.5
Liberal Democrats gain from Labour		Swing		

West Park
Party	Candidate	Votes	%	±%
Labour	Marie Rimmer	1,900	51.8	
Liberal Democrats	Stephen Broughton	1,443	39.3	
Conservative	Charlotte Wood	210	5.7	
Community Action	Tracy Lavelle	116	3.2	
Majority		457	12.5	
Turnout		3,669	41.6	+2.9
Labour hold		Swing		

Windle
Party	Candidate	Votes	%	±%
Conservative	Kenneth Roughley	1,418	48.9	
Labour	Geoffrey Almond	986	34.0	
Liberal Democrats	Kenneth Knowles	494	17.0	
Majority		432	14.9	
Turnout		2,898	36.5	−6.0
Conservative hold		Swing		

== By-elections between 2006 and 2007 ==
Rainford by-election 23 November 2006
Party	Candidate	Votes	%	±%
Conservative	David Grice	1,584	73.3	+13.4
Labour	David Wood	484	22.4	−5.1
Liberal Democrats	Kenneth Knowles	93	4.3	−8.4
Majority		1,100	50.9	+18.5
Turnout		2,161	31.5	−11.2
Conservative hold		Swing		
