= 1990 Knowsley South by-election =

UK parliamentary by-election

← 1987	27 September 1990	1992 →

Constituency of Knowsley South
- Turnout: 33.4% (▼40.7%)
	First party	Second party	Third party
		Con	LD
Candidate	Edward O'Hara	Leslie Byrom	Catherin Hancox
Party	Labour	Conservative	Liberal Democrats
Popular vote	14,581	3,241	1,809
Percentage	68.8%	15.2%	8.5%
Swing	▲4.3%	▼6.4%	▼5.4%
MP before election
Sean Hughes
Labour
Subsequent MP
Edward O'Hara
Labour

The 1990 Knowsley South by-election was a by-election held on 27 September 1990 for the British House of Commons constituency of Knowsley South in Merseyside.

The by-election was caused by the death of the constituency's Labour Party Member of Parliament (MP) Sean Hughes on 25 June.

The result was a Labour hold, with Edward O'Hara winning a majority of over 11,000 votes.

== Result ==
Knowsley South by-election, 1990
Party	Candidate	Votes	%	±%
Labour	Edward O'Hara	14,581	68.8	+4.3
Conservative	Leslie Byrom	3,241	15.2	−6.4
Liberal Democrats	Catherine Hancox	1,809	8.5	−5.4
Green	Raymond Georgeson	656	3.1	New
Liberal	Ian Smith	628	3.0	N/A
Monster Raving Loony	David Sutch	197	0.9	New
Corrective Party	Lady Whiplash	99	0.5	New
Majority		11,367	53.6	+10.7
Turnout		21,184	33.4	−40.7
Labour hold		Swing	-5.4	

== See also ==
- List of United Kingdom by-elections
- Knowsley South constituency
