= St Helens South =

UK Parliament constituency (1983–2010)

Coordinates: 53.448°N 2.731°W

- Former borough constituency for the House of Commons
- Boundary of St Helens South in Merseyside for the 2005 general election

- Location of Merseyside within England
- County: Merseyside

1983–2010
- Seats: One
- Created from: St Helens (Majority), Widnes (Part) and Huyton (Part)
- Replaced by: St Helens South and Whiston

St Helens South was a borough constituency represented in the House of Commons of the Parliament of the United Kingdom. It elected one Member of Parliament (MP) by the first past the post system of election.

== Boundaries ==
The Borough of St Helens wards of Eccleston, Grange Park, Marshalls Cross, Parr and Hardshaw, Queen's Park, Rainhill, Sutton and Bold, Thatto Heath, and West Sutton.

The constituency was one of two covering the Metropolitan Borough of St Helens, the other being St Helens North. It contained the southern part of the borough including the town centre of St Helens, the south of the town, Clock Face and Rainhill.

Following recommendations made by the Boundary Commission for England, St Helens South was replaced with a new St Helens South and Whiston constituency, which includes three wards from Knowsley borough.

== History ==
The forerunner seat had been represented by members of the Labour Party since 1935.

The constituency was formed in 1983, and was represented by Labour's Gerry Bermingham from then until he stood down in 2001. He was replaced by Shaun Woodward, who had defected from the Conservatives to Labour in December 1999. Woodward was deemed unlikely to retain his Witney constituency in Oxfordshire as a Labour candidate (it was subsequently won by David Cameron, future Leader of the Conservatives and Prime Minister of the United Kingdom), and was instead selected for this safe seat. Woodward had won all three elections however he lost his position in the cabinet because of the Labour party defeat to the Liberal Democrat-Conservative coalition government in the 2010 general election.

== Members of Parliament ==
Election	Member	Party	Notes
1983	Gerry Bermingham	Labour	
2001	Shaun Woodward	Labour	Member for Witney (1997–2001); Secretary of State for Northern Ireland (2007–2010); Contested St Helens South and Whiston following redistribution
2010	Constituency renamed: see St Helens South and Whiston		

== Elections ==
=== Elections in the 1980s ===
1979 notional result
Party	Vote	%
Labour	27,385	56.8
Conservative	16,052	33.3
Liberal	4,460	9.3
Others	296	0.6
Turnout	48,193	
Electorate		

General election 1983: St Helens South
Party	Candidate	Votes	%	±%
Labour	Gerry Bermingham	22,906	46.9	−10.0
Conservative	Richard Bull	13,244	27.1	−6.2
SDP	Philip Briers	10,939	22.2	+13.2
Independent	Melvyn Davies	1,780	3.6	New
Majority		9,622	19.8	−3.7
Turnout		48,869	70.6	
Registered electors		69,172		
Labour hold		Swing	−1.9	

General election 1987: St Helens South
Party	Candidate	Votes	%	±%
Labour	Gerry Bermingham	27,027	54.6	+7.7
Conservative	John Brown	13,226	26.7	−0.4
SDP	Philip Briers	9,252	18.7	−3.5
Majority		13,801	27.9	+8.1
Turnout		49,505	71.3	+0.7
Registered electors				
Labour hold		Swing	+4.1	

=== Elections in the 1990s ===
General election 1992: St. Helens South
Party	Candidate	Votes	%	±%
Labour	Gerry Bermingham	30,391	61.0	+6.4
Conservative	Patricia Buzzard	12,182	24.5	−2.2
Liberal Democrats	Brian Spencer	6,933	13.9	−4.8
Natural Law	Harriet Jump	295	0.6	New
Majority		18,209	36.5	+8.6
Turnout		49,801	73.8	+2.5
Registered electors				
Labour hold		Swing	+4.3	

General election 1997: St Helens South
Party	Candidate	Votes	%	±%
Labour	Gerry Bermingham	30,367	68.6	+7.6
Conservative	Mary Russell	6,628	15.0	−9.5
Liberal Democrats	Brian Spencer	5,919	13.4	−0.5
Referendum	William Holdaway	1,165	2.6	New
Natural Law	Harriet Jump	179	0.4	−0.2
Majority		23,739	53.6	+17.1
Turnout		44,258	66.5	−7.3
Registered electors				
Labour hold		Swing		

=== Elections in the 2000s ===
General election 2001: St Helens South
Party	Candidate	Votes	%	±%
Labour	Shaun Woodward	16,799	49.7	−18.9
Liberal Democrats	Brian Spencer	7,814	23.1	+9.7
Conservative	Lee Rotherham	4,675	13.8	−1.2
Socialist Alliance	Neil Thompson	2,325	6.9	New
Socialist Labour	Michael Perry	1,504	4.4	New
UKIP	Bryan Slater	336	1.0	New
Independent	Michael Murphy	271	0.8	New
Independent	David Braid	80	0.2	New
Majority		8,985	26.6	−27.0
Turnout		33,804	51.4	−15.1
Registered electors				
Labour hold		Swing		

General election 2005: St Helens South
Party	Candidate	Votes	%	±%
Labour	Shaun Woodward	19,345	54.5	+4.8
Liberal Democrats	Brian Spencer	10,036	28.3	+5.2
Conservative	Una Riley	4,602	13.0	−0.8
UKIP	Malcolm Nightingale	847	2.4	+1.4
Socialist Labour	Michael Perry	643	1.8	−2.6
Majority		9,309	26.2	−0.4
Turnout		35,473	53.4	+2.0
Registered electors				
Labour hold		Swing	−0.2	

== See also ==
- St Helens South and Whiston
- Parliamentary constituencies in Merseyside
