= Gerry Bermingham =

British politician and barrister (1940–2023)

Member of Parliament for St Helens South
- In office 9 June 1983 – 14 May 2001
- Preceded by: Constituency established
- Succeeded by: Shaun Woodward

Personal details
- Born: Gerald Edward Bermingham; 20 August 1940 Dublin, Ireland
- Died: 2 August 2023 (aged 82) Birmingham, England
- Party: Labour
- Spouse: Jilly Foster
- Education: University of Sheffield
- Profession: Barrister

Gerald Edward Bermingham (20 August 1940 – 2 August 2023) was a British politician and barrister who was a Labour member of parliament for St Helens South from 1983 until 2001.

Bermingham was born 20 August 1940 in Dublin, Ireland, and educated at Cotton College, Wellingborough Grammar School and Sheffield University, where he obtained a degree in law. He was admitted as a solicitor in 1967, and was called to the Bar (Gray's Inn) in 1985. He was a Sheffield City councillor from 1975 to 1979. He contested South East Derbyshire in 1979, but was defeated by the incumbent Conservative Peter Rost.

In 1994, he was one of six Labour MPs who voted against any reduction in the age of consent for homosexuals, even to 18 (at the time, the age of consent was 21).

On his retirement, he was succeeded by Shaun Woodward, a Conservative defector, who swapped his old seat of Witney to represent the ultra-safe St Helens South.

Bermingham died in Birmingham on 2 August 2023, at the age of 82.

== Legal career ==
Bermingham continued to practise from No 5 Chambers, a Birmingham barristers' chambers, in the field of criminal law.

Parliament of the United Kingdom
Preceded by (New constituency)	Member of Parliament for St Helens South; 1983–2001	Succeeded by Shaun Woodward
