= Sean Hughes (politician) =

British history teacher & Labour politician (1946–1990)

Member of Parliament for Knowsley South
- In office 9 June 1983 – 25 June 1990
- Preceded by: Constituency established
- Succeeded by: Eddie O'Hara

Personal details
- Born: Sean Francis Hughes; 8 May 1946 Huyton, England
- Died: 24 June 1990 (aged 44) England
- Party: Labour
- Education: [St Aloysius PrimarySchool], De La Salle School, St Helens, St John's College, Portsmouth
- Alma mater: University of Liverpool

Sean Francis Hughes (8 May 1946 – 24 June 1990) was a British history teacher and Labour politician. He was the local successor to Sir Harold Wilson as a Member of Parliament, and served as a whip and a spokesman on defence issues for his party. Respected for his parliamentary abilities and able to use his historical knowledge in Parliamentary speeches, he played a role in changing Labour's defence policy from unilateral nuclear disarmament to a multilateral approach. His Parliamentary career was cut short by his early death from cancer.

== Early life ==
Hughes was born in Huyton to a Welsh father and Irish Catholic mother. His early life was described as "impeccably working class", with his father Francis Hughes working as a ship fender-maker in Liverpool. After his father's death, his mother Mary moved back to Ireland with his five sisters. He attended St Aloysius Primary School, where he proved to be naturally bright and won a scholarship to West Park Grammar School in St Helens; he spent some time at St John's College, Southsea which was, like West Park Grammar School, run by the De La Salle brothers. He went on to Liverpool University where he obtained a Bachelor of Arts degree and Manchester University for a Master of Arts degree. He attended a Roman Catholic seminary but did not take a religious vocation.

=== Teaching career ===
In 1969 Hughes began work as a trainee personnel manager at the Unilever plant in Port Sunlight. However he was very interested in the subject of history; and obtained a Certificate of Education from Liverpool University. In 1970 he joined the staff of Ruffwood Comprehensive School as a history teacher and from 1973 he was head of the history department. Initially a member of the National Association of Schoolmasters, he was later a member of the National Union of Teachers.

== Politics ==
After joining the Labour Party in 1966, Hughes was elected to Huyton-with-Roby Urban District Council in 1969 and served until the council was abolished in local government reform in 1974. Hughes chaired the Housing Committee of the council, in charge of its council housing: he found he had the power to decide whether a family would be housed.

In 1972 he was selected as prospective Parliamentary candidate for Crosby, then a safe Conservative seat. At the February 1974 general election Hughes came second in Crosby, with 27.2% of the vote and 15,570 votes behind the Conservative winner. He was shortlisted for the Labour candidacy in Wallasey, which was a marginal constituency, before the October 1974 general election, although he was not selected.

He was chairman of Labour Party Young Socialists in the Northern Region for 1970–71. Hughes had in 1973 been elected to Merseyside County Council, serving one term until 1977. He became chairman of Huyton Constituency Labour Party in 1974, an office which had additional significance because the local Labour MP was Harold Wilson who was then Prime Minister. In later years Hughes was able to regale friends with anecdotes about Wilson's time in the constituency. He managed to prevent the Militant tendency infiltrating the constituency party, explaining that "I'm known as a good Catholic who doesn't want trouble".

== Election to Parliament ==
During the 1979 election campaign, Sir Harold Wilson (who had resigned as Prime Minister in 1976) intimated that it would be his last contest. On 27 February 1981, Huyton Labour Party formally announced that Wilson would not seek renomination for the constituency at the next general election. Hughes put his name forward for the new selection, and on 17 May he was selected as prospective Parliamentary candidate for Huyton. Hughes was immediately identified as a moderate within the Labour Party, which was in the middle of an intense internal struggle between left-wingers and moderates. He was duly endorsed by the National Executive Committee in the same month.

Sir Harold Wilson wrote in April 1983 that Huyton CLP had "consistently kept the extreme left-wing faction in check" and stated that Hughes had twice been responsible for proposing motions which defeated left-wing manoeuvring intended to take over the party – including one quite recent attempt. Boundary changes enacted shortly before the election abolished the Huyton constituency, and Hughes transferred to the new constituency of Knowsley South which was based on Huyton and Roby. At the 1983 general election Hughes was elected with a majority of 11,769. Although there was a national swing to the Conservatives, in Knowsley South the swing was to Labour and Hughes had a higher majority than there would have been for a Labour candidate in 1979.

== In Parliament ==
Making his maiden speech on 27 June 1983, Hughes referred to the council estates that made up most of his constituency as "monotonous labyrinths, bleak, grimly regimented and dehumanising". He complained that the resources to improve the estates were being withheld and that parts of the constituency had unemployment problems even more severe than elsewhere on Merseyside. Later that year he deplored the closure of the Huntley & Palmers biscuits plant at Huyton, and pledged to raise the issue with the Government although he was sure they would refuse to intervene.

Hughes quickly grew disillusioned about some of the routine work of a "voting fodder" Member of Parliament, and began suffering what he called "backbencher blues"; where once he had been able to decide housing allocations, he now felt he could do very little for the same families. He did get on well with the catering staff of the Houses of Parliament; they nicknamed him 'Yosser', while he noted that they had trained at a catering college in his constituency. His Parliamentary speeches were often enlivened by historical allusions, and were often scathing of the Thatcher Government but also for good humour, which won him friends on both sides of the Commons. Hughes' good humour was said to desert him only on Monday mornings if Everton F.C. had been defeated at the weekend.

He was particularly passionate about improving education, serving on the Select Committee on Education from 1983. He also spoke forcefully on unemployment in his constituency, and was interested in the politics of Ireland, where he opposed extremist nationalism partly due to his understanding of European history.

== Opposition whip ==
In 1984 Hughes was appointed as an opposition whip; it was said that he would regard being called a "loyalist" as an accolade. When Robert Kilroy-Silk resigned as MP for the next door constituency of Knowsley North, Hughes was chosen as the organiser for the campaign of his successor George Howarth who had been imposed on a Militant dominated CLP by the Labour Party headquarters. Militant had hoped to see one of their members selected, and some of their fury was taken out on Hughes. Howarth was comfortably elected in the by-election.

Hughes' skill as an organiser was also seen earlier that year when the FA Cup was a Merseyside derby played between Everton F.C. (which he supported) and their great local rivals, Liverpool F.C. Hughes realised that Scottish MPs were given two free tickets to the English FA Cup in which few were interested; he lobbied nearly all the 72 Scots asking if they wanted the tickets or would give them to his constituents. The response was said to be good.

== Shadow Defence minister ==
Re-elected in the 1987 general election with a majority nearly doubled on 1983, Hughes was appointed as a member of the defence shadow ministerial team to speak on issues relating to the Army. His historical knowledge came to be very helpful and Hughes established a strong reputation for being able to spot weaknesses in Government policy; Ministers were said to have made sure they were well briefed when facing him. A report in the Conservative supporting Daily Telegraph described him as "the sort of MP that Labour doesn't deserve to have", a joke which Hughes himself reportedly enjoyed.

He had been a lifelong supporter of unilateral nuclear disarmament and CND, but the Labour Party was embarking on a policy review. When Denzil Davies resigned as Shadow Secretary of State for Defence and was replaced by Martin O'Neill in 1988, Hughes assisted the team in helping to draft a new defence policy which would not lose votes for the party (as the policy in 1987 was thought to have done). He organised a referendum in his constituency party which appeared to repudiate unilateralism: 68% of party members thought that Britain should give up nuclear weapons only if other countries did so too. The Labour Party adopted a policy of multilateral disarmament at its 1989 conference.

== Death ==
Hughes had been suffering from cancer for some time before his death in June 1990, one of three Labour MPs on Merseyside to have died in their 40s that year. He left a wife and young daughter.

Parliament of the United Kingdom
New constituency	Member for Knowsley South; 1983 – 1990	Succeeded by Eddie O'Hara
