= Eddie O'Hara (politician) =

British politician (1937–2016)

Member of Parliament for Knowsley South
- In office 27 September 1990 – 12 April 2010
- Preceded by: Sean Hughes
- Succeeded by: Constituency abolished

Personal details
- Born: Edward O'Hara; 1 October 1937 Bootle, England
- Died: 28 May 2016 (aged 78) Huyton, England
- Party: Labour
- Spouse: Lilian Hopkins (m. 1962)
- Children: 3
- Education: Liverpool Collegiate School
- Alma mater: Magdalen College, Oxford; University of London

Edward O'Hara (1 October 1937 – 28 May 2016) was a British Labour politician who became Member of Parliament (MP) for Knowsley South following the death of Sean Hughes.

He held the seat from 1990 until 2010 when the constituency was abolished. During this period his seat was considered the safest Labour seat in the country. He was chairman of the committee for technology and aerospace of the Western European Union and was succeeded in 2009 by the German politician Axel Fischer.

O'Hara left the House of Commons in 2010, after being defeated in the selection process to become Labour candidate for the new seat of Knowsley by fellow MP George Howarth.

== Early life ==
O'Hara was born in Bootle, near Liverpool. He was educated at the direct-grant grammar Liverpool Collegiate School, then Magdalen College, Oxford, gaining an MA in Literae Humaniores, and the University of London. Before entering Parliament, O'Hara was a councillor in Knowsley and Chair of the Education Committee.

A lifelong Liverpool F.C. supporter, he taught Latin and Greek at Perse School, Cambridge, and at Birkenhead School before lecturing at C.F. Mott College of Education (later Liverpool Polytechnic) from 1970 to 1975, at the City of Liverpool College of Higher Education from 1975 to 1985, and at Liverpool Polytechnic from 1985 to 1990.

== Personal life ==
He married Lilian Hopkins on 11 September 1962 in Bootle; the couple had two sons and a daughter.

Parliament of the United Kingdom
Preceded by Sean Hughes	Member of Parliament for Knowsley South; 1990–2010	Constituency abolished
