= St Helens South and Whiston =

UK Parliament constituency (since 2010)

Coordinates: 53.448°N 2.731°W

St. Helens South and Whiston
- Borough constituency for the House of Commons
- Interactive map of boundaries since 2024
- Location within North West England
- County: Merseyside
- Electorate: 70,937 (March 2020)
- Major settlements: Eccleston, Prescot, Rainhill, St Helens, Sutton, Thatto Heath, Whiston

Current constituency
- Created: 2010
- Member of Parliament: Marie Rimmer (Labour)
- Seats: One
- Created from: St Helens South, Knowsley South (part)

St. Helens South and Whiston is a constituency created in 2010 represented in the House of Commons of the UK Parliament since 2015 by Marie Rimmer of the Labour Party. (Note: A borough constituency (for the purposes of election expenses and type of returning officer. As with all constituencies, the constituency elects one Member of Parliament (MP) by the first past the post system of election at least every five years.)

== Constituency profile ==
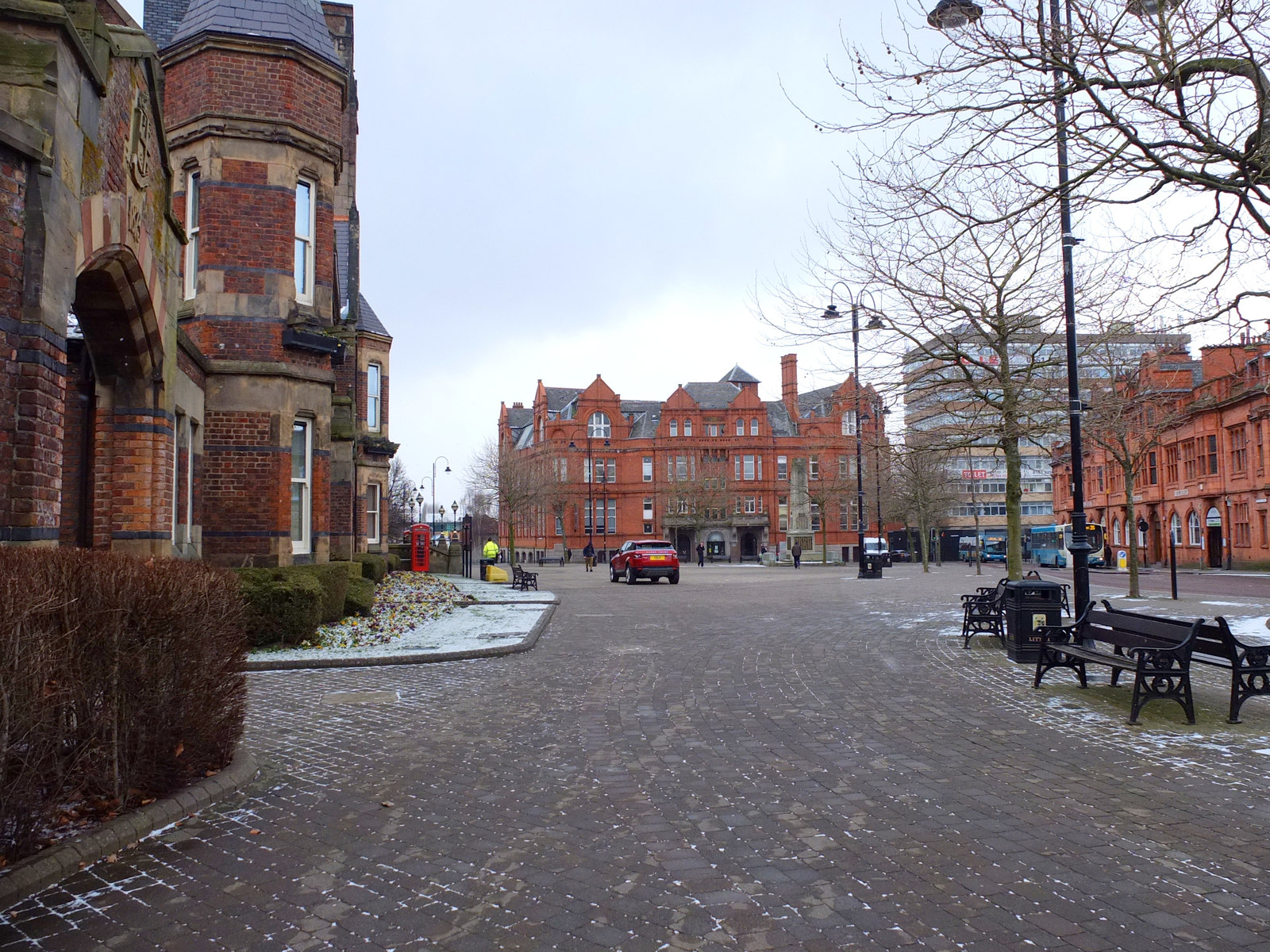
St Helens town hall

St Helens South and Whiston is a constituency in Merseyside in North West England. It covers the central and southern areas of the town of St Helens (Eccleston, Thatto Heath and Sutton), most of the town of Whiston and the village of Rainhill.

St Helens is a large, industrial town. It was a rural hamlet until the Industrial Revolution when it grew rapidly as a centre for coal mining, glassmaking and metalworking. Whiston was mostly developed as an overspill town for Liverpool (located around 8 miles (13 km) to the west) after large parts of the city were damaged in World War II. Whiston and much of St Helens are highly-deprived, with most residents living in dense terraced or semi-detached properties, many of which are socially rented. Sutton and Rainhill are wealthier and Eccleston is affluent and suburban in character. House prices across the constituency are generally lower than the rest of North West England and the average price is around half the UK average.

Residents of St Helens South and Whiston have a similar age profile to the rest of the country. They have low rates of income and average levels of homeownership and child poverty. Residents generally have low levels of education and many residents are religious; like much of Merseyside, there is a large Roman Catholic population here due to historic Irish migration. A high proportion of residents work in the health sector and the percentage claiming unemployment benefits is in line with the overall UK figure. White people made up 96% of the population at the 2021 census.

Most of the constituency is represented by Reform UK at the local council level, although some Green Party councillors were elected in Whiston, Liberal Democrats in Eccleston and independents in Rainhill. An estimated 56% of voters in St Helens South and Whiston supported leaving the European Union in the 2016 referendum, higher than the UK-wide figure of 52%.

== History ==
Creation

Following the Fifth periodic review of Westminster constituencies the Boundary Commission for England expanded and renamed the St Helens South seat, covering the south of the Metropolitan Borough of St Helens and three wards of the Knowsley borough which were in the neighbouring seat of Knowsley South (abolished).

Further to the completion of the 2023 review of Westminster constituencies, the seat was subject to minor boundary changes, with parts of Whiston and Cronton ward being included in the new constituency of Widnes and Halewood, first contested at the 2024 general election.

Results of the winning party

The predecessor seats of St Helens and St Helens South had been held by the Labour Party since the 1935 election.

This seat's first MP was Shaun Woodward who had been MP for St Helens South from 2001 to 2010. He had first been elected to Parliament in 1997 as the Conservative MP for Witney, defecting to Labour in 1999. He was succeeded by Marie Rimmer at the 2015 election. The 2015 result made the seat the 24th safest of Labour's 232 seats by percentage of majority.

Results of other parties

The 2015 general election saw (with 11.3%) more than the national average swing (+9.5%) to UKIP (narrowly placed third). Labour's candidate won more than fivefold those votes, scoring 59.8%.

The Liberal Democrats came second in 2010 with 22.2% of the vote; this has gradually declined and by the 2024 general election they came in sixth with 5.8%. Reform UK were runners-up in 2024, having increased its vote to 18.3% from 10.6% in 2019 (as the Brexit Party). The Conservatives were relegated to fourth place in 2024 by independent candidate James Tasker.

Turnout

Turnout has ranged from 53.3% (2024) to 66.9% (2017).

== Boundaries ==
Map of boundaries between 2010 and 2024

=== 2010–2024 ===
The following electoral wards:

- From Knowsley: Prescot East, Whiston North and Whiston South
- From St Helens: Bold, Eccleston, Rainhill, Sutton, Thatto Heath, Town Centre and West Park.

=== Current ===
Further to the 2023 review of Westminster constituencies which came into effect for the 2024 general election, the constituency was defined as being composed of the following, as they existed on 1 December 2020:

- The Metropolitan Borough of Knowsley wards of: Prescot South; Whiston & Cronton (polling district WC5).
- The Borough of St Helens wards of: Bold; Eccleston; Rainhill; Sutton; Thatto Heath; Town Centre; West Park.

Following a local government boundary review in St Helens coming into effect in May 2022, the constituency now comprises the following from the 2024 general election:

- The Metropolitan Borough of Knowsley wards of: Prescot South; Whiston & Cronton (polling district WC5).
- The Borough of St Helens wards of: Bold & Lea Green; Eccleston; Peasley Cross & Fingerpost; Rainhill; St Helens Town Centre; Sutton North West; Sutton South East (nearly all); Thatto Heath; West Park.

The majority of the Whiston & Cronton ward - excluding the town centre of Whiston - was included in the new constituency of Widnes and Halewood.

== Members of Parliament ==
St Helens South prior to 2010

Election	Member	Party	Notes
2010	Shaun Woodward	Labour	Member for St Helens South (2001–2010)
2015	Marie Rimmer	Labour	

== Elections ==
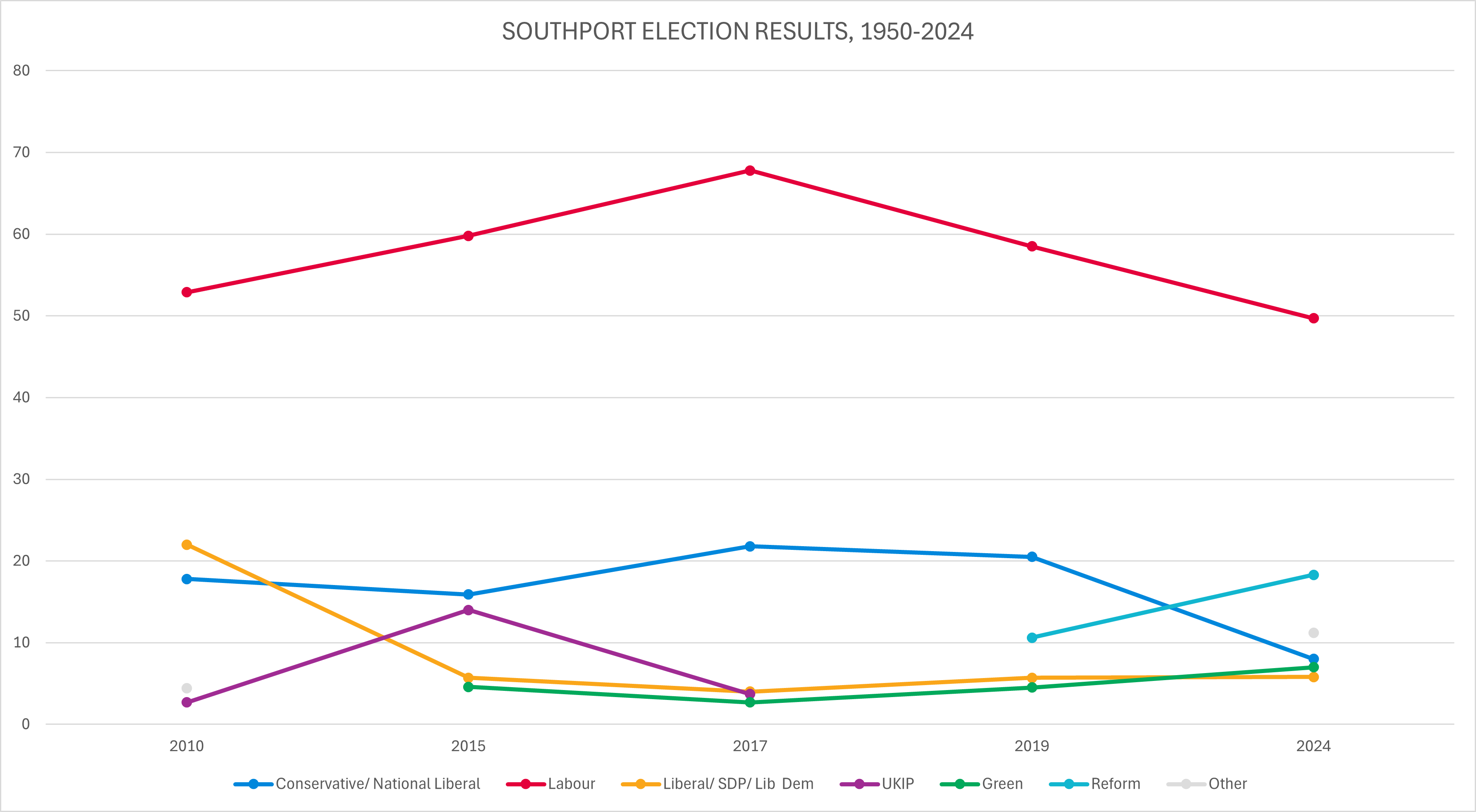
Election results 2010–2024

=== Elections in the 2020s ===
General election 2024: St Helens South and Whiston
Party	Candidate	Votes	%	±%
Labour	Marie Rimmer	18,919	49.7	−8.4
Reform	Raymond Peters	6,974	18.3	+7.7
Independent	James Tasker	4,244	11.2	New
Conservative	Emma Ellison	3,057	8.0	−13.3
Green	Terence Price	2,642	7.0	+2.7
Liberal Democrats	Brian Spencer	2,199	5.8	+0.1
Majority		11,945	31.4	−5.4
Turnout		38,035	53.1	−10.9
Registered electors		71,569		+0.9
Labour hold		Swing	–8.4	

2019 notional result
Party	Vote	%
Labour	26,386	58.1
Conservative	9,666	21.3
Brexit Party	4,822	10.6
Liberal Democrats	2,579	5.7
Green	1,944	4.3
Turnout	45,397	64.0
Electorate	70,937	

=== Elections in the 2010s ===
General election 2019: St Helens South and Whiston
Party	Candidate	Votes	%	±%
Labour	Marie Rimmer	29,457	58.5	−9.3
Conservative	Richard Short	10,335	20.5	−1.3
Brexit Party	Daniel Oxley	5,353	10.6	New
Liberal Democrats	Brian Spencer	2,886	5.7	+1.7
Green	Kai Taylor	2,282	4.5	+1.8
Majority		19,122	38.0	−8.0
Turnout		50,313	63.6	−3.3
Registered electors		79,058		
Labour hold		Swing	−4.0	

General election 2017: St Helens South and Whiston
Party	Candidate	Votes	%	±%
Labour	Marie Rimmer	35,879	67.8	+8.0
Conservative	Ed McRandal	11,536	21.8	+5.9
Liberal Democrats	Brian Spencer	2,101	4.0	−1.7
UKIP	Mark Hitchen	1,953	3.7	−10.3
Green	Jess Northey	1,417	2.7	−1.9
Majority		24,343	46.0	+2.1
Turnout		52,886	66.9	+4.6
Registered electors		79,036		
Labour hold		Swing	+1.1	

General election 2015: St Helens South and Whiston
Party	Candidate	Votes	%	±%
Labour	Marie Rimmer	28,950	59.8	+6.9
Conservative	Gillian Keegan	7,707	15.9	−1.9
UKIP	John Beirne	6,766	14.0	+11.3
Liberal Democrats	Brian Spencer	2,737	5.7	−16.5
Green	James Chan	2,237	4.6	New
Majority		21,243	43.9	+13.2
Turnout		48,397	62.3	+3.2
Registered electors		77,720		
Labour hold		Swing	+4.4	

General election 2010: St Helens South and Whiston
Party	Candidate	Votes	%	±%
Labour	Shaun Woodward *	24,364	52.9	−2.7
Liberal Democrats	Brian Spencer	10,242	22.2	−6.6
Conservative	Val Allen	8,209	17.8	+5.7
BNP	James Winstanley	2,040	4.4	New
UKIP	John Sumner	1,226	2.7	+0.8
Majority		14,122	30.7	+3.9
Turnout		46,081	59.1	+5.9
Registered electors		77,975		+1.0
Labour hold		Swing	+1.9	

* Served as an MP in the 2005–2010 Parliament

2005 notional result
Party	Vote	%
Labour	22,820	55.6
Liberal Democrats	11,833	28.8
Conservative	4,977	12.1
UKIP	781	1.9
Others	643	1.6
Turnout	41,054	53.2
Electorate	77,162	

== See also ==
- St Helens South parliamentary constituency
- Parliamentary constituencies in Merseyside
