= Knowsley South =

UK Parliament constituency (1983–2010)

Coordinates: 53.425°N 2.824°W

- Former county constituency for the House of Commons
- Boundary of Knowsley South in Merseyside for the 2005 general election

- Location of Merseyside within England
- County: Merseyside

1983–2010
- Seats: One
- Created from: Huyton and Widnes
- Replaced by: Knowsley, Garston and Halewood, St Helens South and Whiston

Knowsley South was a constituency in Merseyside, represented in the House of Commons of the Parliament of the United Kingdom. It elected one Member of Parliament (MP) by the first past the post system of election.

It existed from 1983 to 2010.

== History ==
Sean Hughes of the Labour Party held the seat from its creation at the 1983 election until his death in June 1990. The resulting by-election that September was won by Eddie O'Hara, also of the Labour Party. O'Hara then held the seat until its abolition in 2010.

This was a safe Labour seat for the entire period of its existence, with the party's share of the vote exceeding 68% at all six elections in that time.

== Boundaries ==
1983–1997: The Metropolitan Borough of Knowsley wards of Halewood East, Halewood South, Halewood West, Longview, Page Moss, Princess, Roby, St Gabriel's, St Michael's, Swanside, Whiston North, and Whiston South.

1997–2010: The Metropolitan Borough of Knowsley wards of Halewood East, Halewood South, Halewood West, Longview, Page Moss, Prescot East, Prescot West, Princess, Roby, St Gabriel's, St Michael's, Swanside, Whiston North, and Whiston South.

Knowsley South was created in 1983, replacing the former Huyton seat. The constituency covered the southern part of the metropolitan borough of Knowsley, including Halewood, Huyton, Prescot, Roby and Whiston.

This seat and its neighbour Knowsley North and Sefton East were abolished at the 2010 general election, following the decisions of the Boundary Commission for England. Most of Knowsley South has formed the larger part of a new Knowsley constituency, except for the area around Halewood, which has become part of the new Garston and Halewood seat, and parts of Prescot and Whiston which have become part of St Helens South and Whiston.

== Members of Parliament ==
Election	Member	Party	Notes
1983	Sean Hughes	Labour	Died in office June 1990
1990 by-election	Eddie O'Hara	Labour	Elected in September 1990 by-election
2010	constituency abolished: see Knowsley, Garston and Halewood & St Helens South and Whiston		

== Elections ==
=== Elections in the 1980s ===
General election 1983: Knowsley South
Party	Candidate	Votes	%	±%
Labour	Sean Hughes	25,727	53.7	
Conservative	Elizabeth Lamont	13,958	29.2	
Liberal	Ian Smith	8,173	17.1	
Majority		11,769	24.5	
Turnout		47,858	70.3	
Labour win (new seat)				

General election 1987: Knowsley South
Party	Candidate	Votes	%	±%
Labour	Sean Hughes	31,378	64.5	+10.8
Conservative	Anthony Hall	10,532	21.6	−7.6
SDP	Ruth Watmough	6,760	13.9	−3.2
Majority		20,846	42.9	+18.4
Turnout		48,670	74.1	+3.8
Labour hold		Swing	+9.2	

=== Elections in the 1990s ===
1990 Knowsley South by-election
Party	Candidate	Votes	%	±%
Labour	Eddie O'Hara	14,581	68.8	+4.3
Conservative	Leslie T. Byrom	3,241	15.2	−6.4
Liberal Democrats	Catherine V. Hancox	1,809	8.5	−5.4
Green	Raymond L. Georgeson	656	3.1	New
Liberal	Ian Smith	628	3.0	New
Monster Raving Loony	Screaming Lord Sutch	197	0.9	New
Corrective Party	Lady Whiplash	99	0.5	New
Majority		11,367	53.6	+10.7
Turnout		21,184	33.4	−40.7
Labour hold		Swing	−5.4	

General election 1992: Knowsley South
Party	Candidate	Votes	%	±%
Labour	Eddie O'Hara	31,933	68.6	+4.1
Conservative	Leslie T. Byrom	9,922	21.3	−0.3
Liberal Democrats	Ian Smith	4,480	9.6	−4.3
Natural Law	Michelangelo Raiano	217	0.5	New
Majority		22,011	47.3	+4.4
Turnout		46,552	74.7	+0.6
Labour hold		Swing	+2.2	

General election 1997: Knowsley South
Party	Candidate	Votes	%	±%
Labour	Eddie O'Hara	36,695	77.1	+7.6
Conservative	Gary R. Robertson	5,987	12.6	−7.9
Liberal Democrats	Clifford A. Mainey	3,954	8.3	−0.7
Referendum	Andrew Wright	954	2.0	New
Majority		30,708	64.5	+15.5
Turnout		47,590	67.5	−7.2
Labour hold		Swing	+7.8	

=== Elections in the 2000s ===
General election 2001: Knowsley South
Party	Candidate	Votes	%	±%
Labour	Eddie O'Hara	26,071	71.3	−5.8
Liberal Democrats	David J.G. Smithson	4,755	13.0	+4.7
Conservative	Paul L. Jemetta	4,250	11.6	−1.0
Socialist Labour	Alan D. Fogg	1,068	2.9	New
Independent	Mona M. McNee	446	1.2	New
Majority		21,316	58.3	−6.2
Turnout		36,590	51.8	−15.7
Labour hold		Swing		

General election 2005: Knowsley South
Party	Candidate	Votes	%	±%
Labour	Eddie O'Hara	24,820	68.1	−3.2
Liberal Democrats	David J.G. Smithson	7,132	19.6	+6.6
Conservative	Andrea Leadsom	4,492	12.3	+0.7
Majority		17,688	48.5	−9.8
Turnout		36,444	51.5	−0.3
Labour hold		Swing	−4.9	

== See also ==
- List of parliamentary constituencies in Merseyside
