= Eccleston, St Helens =

Coordinates: 53.4539°N 2.7748°W

Eccleston
- Village and Civil Parish
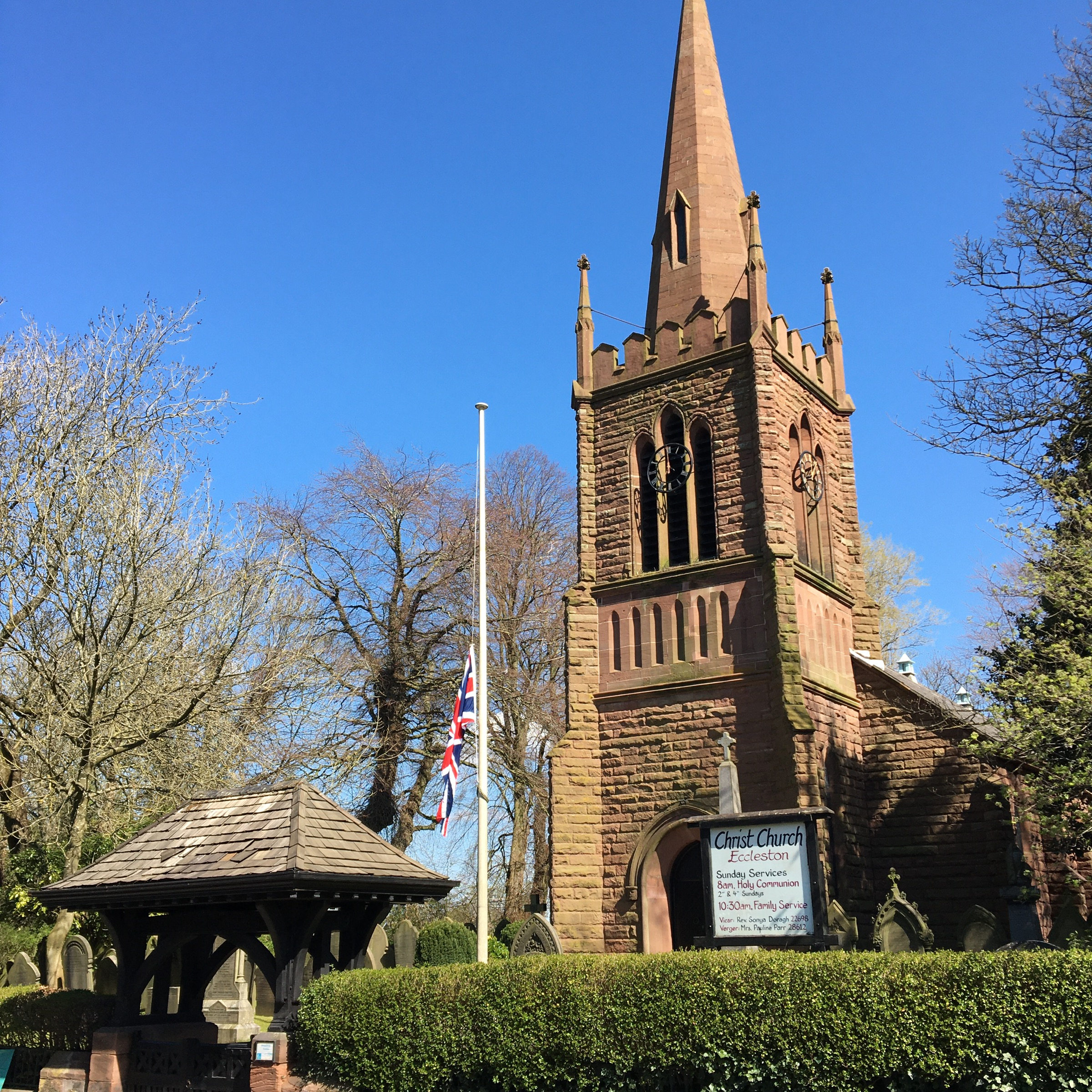
- Christ Church, Eccleston

- Location within Merseyside
- Population: 10,433 (2011 census)
- OS grid reference: SJ485955
- Civil parish: Eccleston
- Metropolitan borough: St. Helens
- Metropolitan county: Merseyside
- Region: North West
- Country: England
- Sovereign state: United Kingdom
- Post town: ST. HELENS
- Postcode district: WA10
- Dialling code: 01744
- Police: Merseyside
- Fire: Merseyside
- Ambulance: North West
- UK Parliament: St Helens South and Whiston
- Website: www.ecclestonpc.org.uk

Eccleston is a civil parish in the Metropolitan Borough of St Helens, Merseyside, England. At the 2011 census, it had a population of 10,433.

Within the boundaries of the historic county of Lancashire, the early history of Eccleston is marked by its status as a township, an area much larger than the modern civil parish, extending into what is now St. Helens. Part of the township was united with Parr, Sutton and part of Windle to form the Municipal Borough of St Helens in 1868.

Eccleston is one of seven civil parishes in the Borough of St Helens and one of the largest, covering the neighbourhoods of Eccleston Park, Gillars Green, Eccleston Mere, Eccleston village and an area around the A580 East Lancashire Road.

== Origins of the name ==
Eccleston appears to derive its name from either the Latin ecclesia or the Welsh eglwys, both meaning "church", suggesting a common link to a place of worship (although none is known in that township until the 19th century) and a possible Celtic origin. It is suggested that the name is connected with the adjoining Prescot which has had a church for over a thousand years.

== History ==
Eccleston composed, with Sutton and Rainhill, part of a single Widnes "fee" (a hereditary entitlement of ownership) under a Knight or Earl. In 1907 the area was described as being between "two extremes, the green woods of Knowsley Park on the west, and the smoke-laden environs of St. Helens on the east" and referring to the parish more widely as turned to agriculture with the village resting "in a hollow". Recent archaeological studies have remarked on the lack of a single prominent settlement.

Descendants of Hugh de Eccleston owned the Eccleston township. The direct family line is recorded throughout the period until the 17th century when their last descendent Henry Eccleston died. Relatives took the name Eccleston and remained associated with both Eccleston and Scarisbrick until Ann Scarisbrick Eccleston inherited Scarisbrick Hall and on so doing moved there, the hall being much more impressive and grander than her Eccleston Hall home. The Eccleston family throughout their tenure were recusants and there was a Catholic chapel in the old hall which was built in the Tudor era.

The Eccleston estate was sold to cotton manufacturer Colonel Samuel Taylor in about 1812 and, while there have been halls on the site from the late mediaeval period, the present Grade II listed Eccleston Hall dates from about 1830.

There does not seem to have been a church in the township of Eccleston until Portico Our Lady's Roman Catholic chapel in the late 18th century. St Thomas, Eccleston (now on Westfield Street, St Helens) dates from 1839 and Christ Church in Eccleston village (built by Samuel Taylor of Eccleston Hall) from 1838.

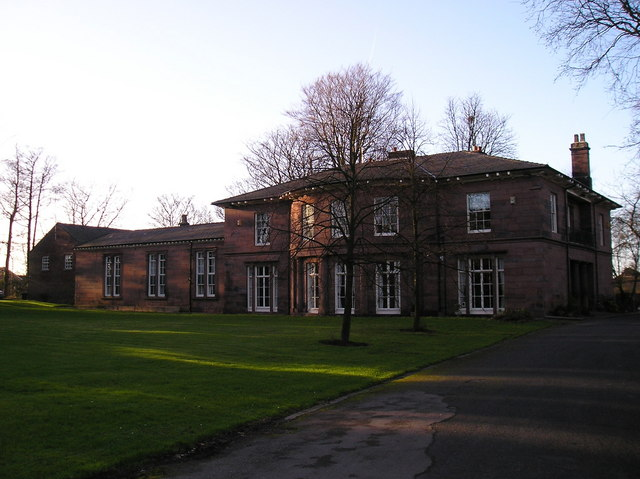
Eccleston Hall

== Governance ==
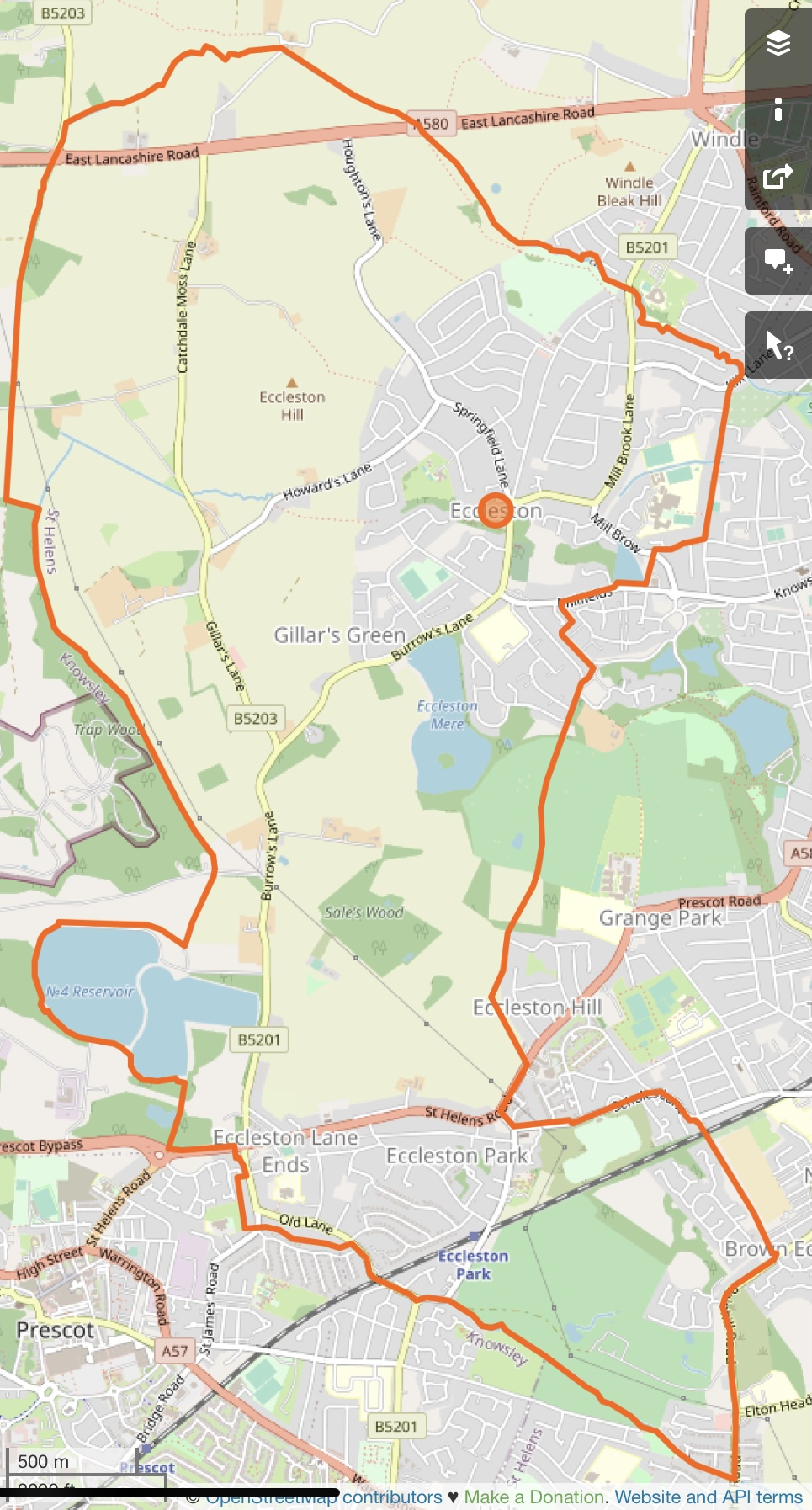
Map showing the boundaries of Eccleston Civil Parish.

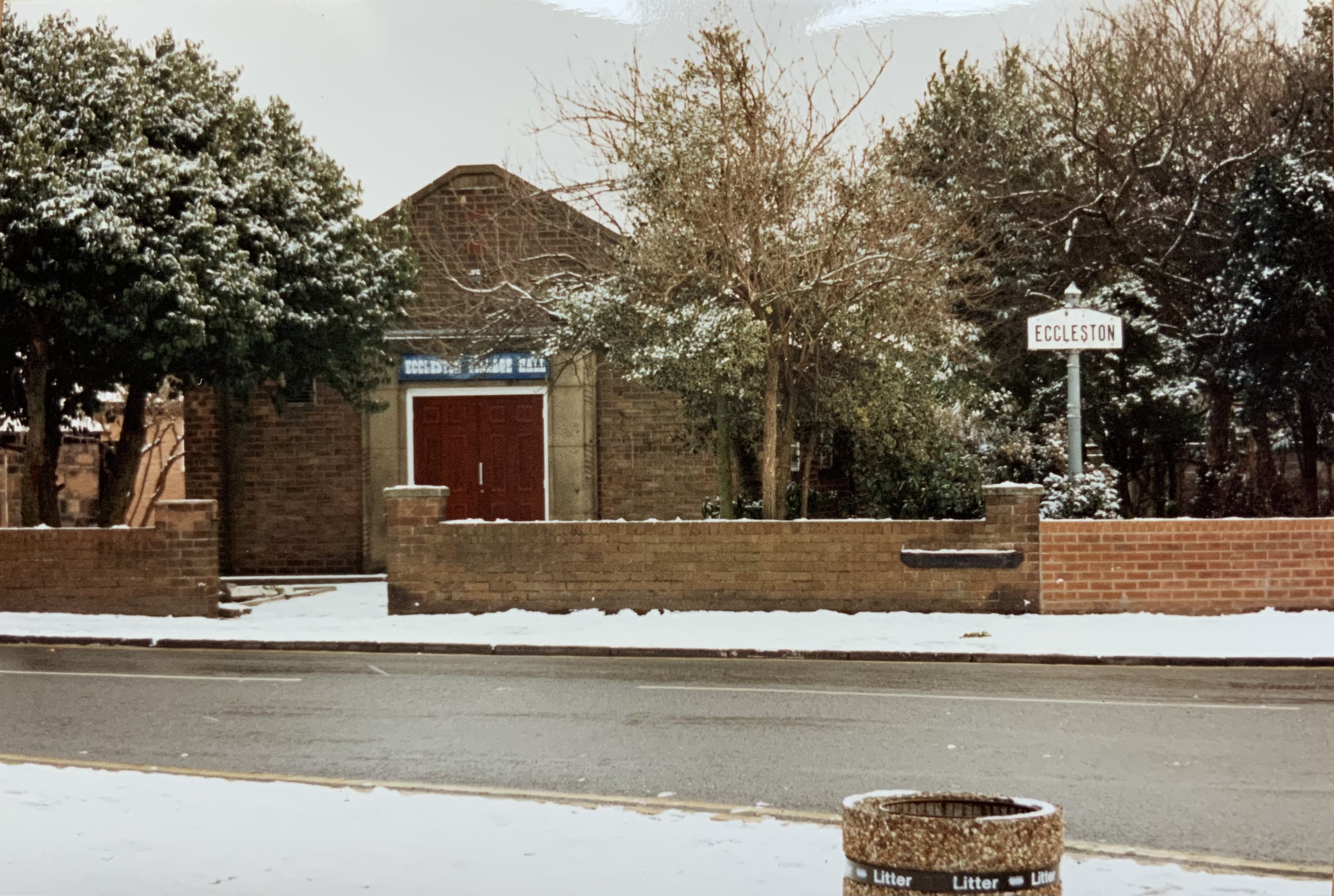
Eccleston Village Hall and Signpost

Local Government in Eccleston has been administered by Lancashire County Council (1889–1974), Whiston Rural District Council (1894–1974) and Eccleston Parish Council (from 1894). Today, Eccleston continues to be administered by Eccleston Parish Council (since 1894), as well as by St Helens Borough Council (since 1974).

For the purposes of UK Parliament elections, Eccleston has been part of the following constituencies: Lancashire (1290–1832); South Lancashire (1832–1868); South West Lancashire (1868–1885); Widnes (1885–1950); Huyton (1950–1983); St Helens South (1983–2010); St Helens South and Whiston (since 2010).

== Public open spaces ==
Although mainly rural, Eccleston is built upon green fertile rolling hills with countryside to the north and west together with urban sprawl to the south and east.

Running through Eccleston there is a stream or brook called Windle Brook (actually the boundary with Windle Civil Parish) and Mill Brook.

There is a mere called Eccleston Mere and three dams which were originally used for cooling purposes in factories. There are several open public spaces including many woods and a small nature reserve at Mill Brow, which has benefitted from improvements in conjunction with Eccleston Parish Council and the Lancashire Wildlife Trust.

There are a number of public footpaths through the Eccleston countryside such as Green Lane, Watery Lane and Sadlers Lane.

There is a large public area at Ecclesfield playing fields, which is located behind the library. Other public fields are located at Kiln Lane, Bobbies Lane and Christ Church.

== Transport ==
Road connections are to the M6, M62, M57 and M58. The A580 (Liverpool to Manchester) locally known as the 'East Lancs' is a 1930s trunk road running north of the borough linking the M58 and M6, traffic problems are often reported at the notorious Windle Island. The A570 (St Helens to Southport) links the M58 and M62. The B5201 takes traffic from Prescot through the centre of Eccleston.

There are many frequent bus services that run to parts of St Helens and Liverpool some of these are: 35/35A Gillars Green-St Helens Junction (Arriva) 37 Eccleston-St Helens Bus Station (Arriva) Eccleston Park railway station is within the Parish boundaries but there are also a number of other stations close by such as St Helens Central, St Helens Junction, Prescot and Whiston. Liverpool John Lennon Airport is the closest airport and Manchester second to that, both no more than a 45-minute drive.

== Housing ==
Houses in Eccleston include 1930s semi-detached homes in Eccleston village, council estates at Gillars Green and Trapwood Close (now a mixture of private and housing association property), small 1970s housing estates at Eccleston Mere and an abundance of 1990s detached houses, including small developments at Ledbury Close, Long Meadow, Eccleston Woods and The Cloisters.

Most recently, detached houses have been built at The Spires, Pikes Bridge Fold and on the site of the former Carmelite Monastery. Extensive development has recently been completed at Eccleston Grange on the site of the old Triplex factory.

== Economy ==
Eccleston is a suburban area with a limited number of shops at Walmesley Road, Mill Brook Lane, Millfields and Gillars Green Drive. These are mainly local shops including three small supermarkets, four hairdressers, a chemist, a florist, wine shop, veterinary practice, doctor's, two bakers and a continental-style coffeehouse.

Broadway offers a library, a private day nursery and an NHS dental practice. A private dental practice is situated on Kiln Lane.

A number of Mother and Toddler groups take place at St Julie's Parish Hall, the library and the Lester Drive Centre.

Eccleston has several pubs including The Seven Stars, The Griffin, The Stanley, The Game Bird (previously The Royal Oak), The Wellington and The Grapes. All of these public houses serve food.

== Landmarks ==
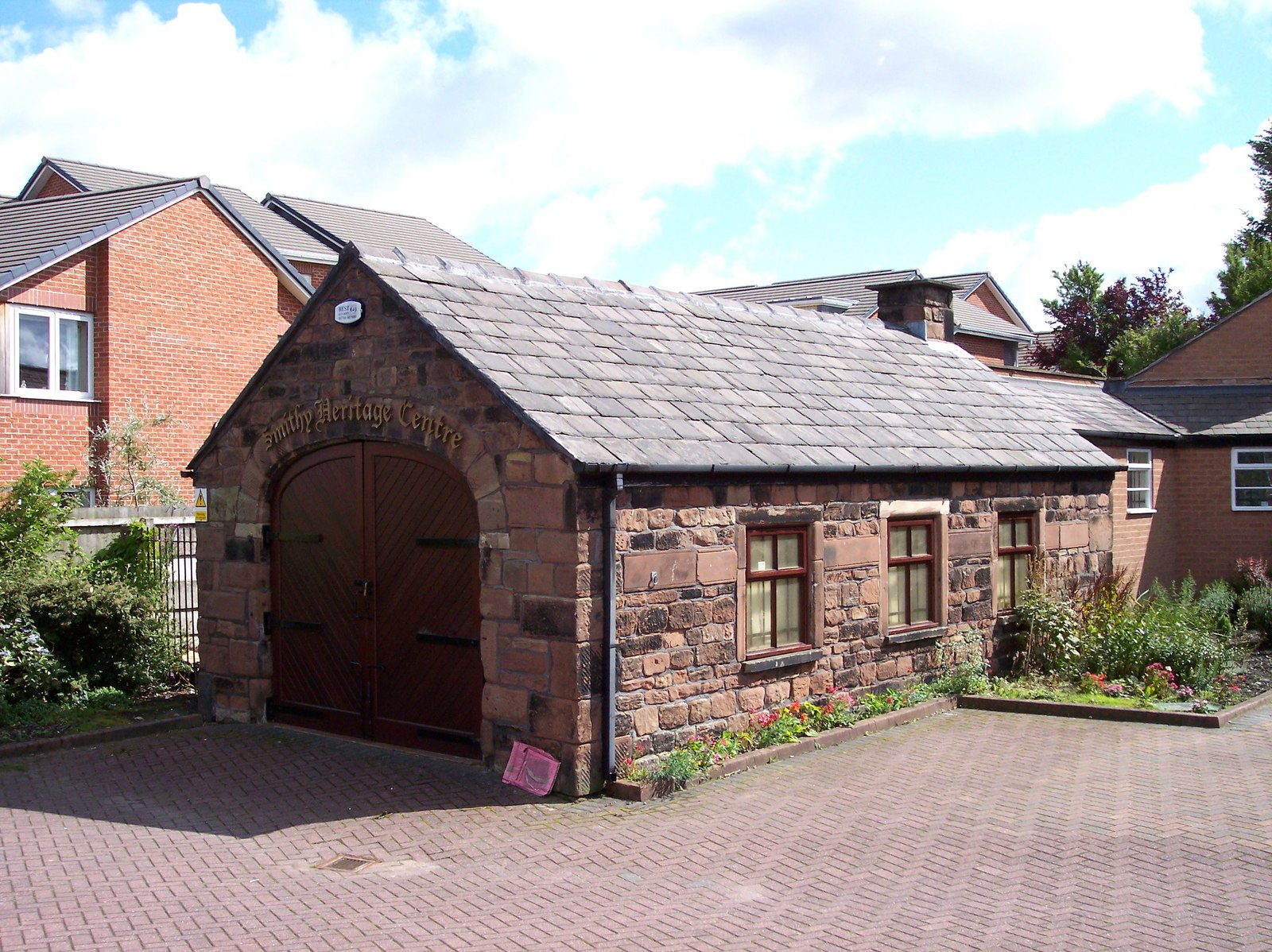
Smithy Heritage Centre.

The main attraction is The Smithy Heritage Centre, a museum about the works of a local blacksmith's business and dedicated to the history of Eccleston. The centre is situated next to Eccleston Village Hall, which was built by Lancashire County Council to house a County Library for Eccleston, subsequently transformed into the village hall when a new library was established on Broadway.

The former township of Eccleston (prior to the modern Civil Parish) was home to the St Helens R.F.C. rugby team (known locally as 'The Saints') and St. Helens Town AFC (St Helens non-league football side), from 1890 until stadium closure in 2010, when both teams moved from the Knowsley Road stadium to Langtree Park. The capacity of the Knowsley Road stadium was 19,100 (standing) with 3,000 seats in the main stand. The stadium also boasted a restaurant and a club official store.

Eccleston Mere is owned by Pheasant Equities Ltd of Rainford Hall and is jointly supervised by the Pilkington Sailing Club and the Pilkington Angling Association. The mere was originally constructed to hold water to feed through to Pilkington's Watson Street works, but is now used solely for recreational purposes.

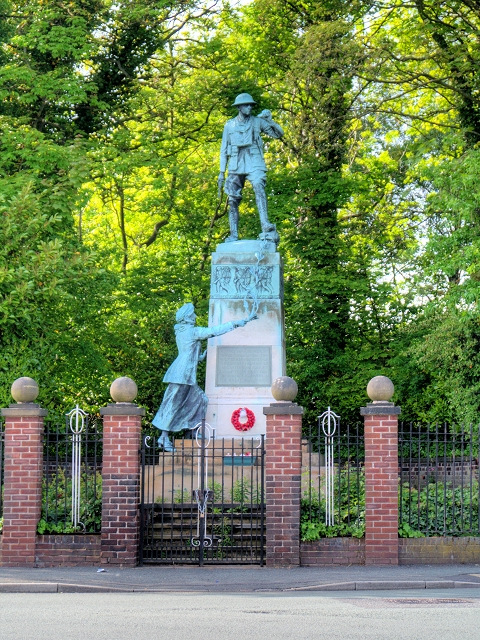
Eccleston War Memorial – erected in 1922 for the West Derby Hundred of the County Palatine of Lancaster.

Erected in 1922, the striking war memorial at Eccleston Lane Ends was designed by Walter Gilbert and Louis Weingartner of Martyns and is Grade II* listed.

A bronze relief panel depicts (anti-clockwise) marching soldiers, airmen, soldiers with camels and seamen loading a naval gun. Thought to be unique in its dedication, the panels read: "The laurels of the sons are watered from the hearts of the mothers."

The front face is inscribed: "To the glorious memory of all those from the West Derby Hundred of the County Palatine of Lancaster who fought and gave their lives for their King and Country in the Great War 1914-1918."

== People and culture ==
A resident of Eccleston is known as an "Ecclestonian". Accents in Eccleston vary from that of a St Helens accent through to a more well spoken northern English accent. The people of Eccleston are mainly of Eccleston or St Helens origin with family in the area. Eccleston is an area with households mainly comprising families and the elderly.

Religion is still quite vibrant in Eccleston with several churches including St Julie (Roman Catholic), Christ Church (Church of England) and Our Lady Help of Christians, Portico (Roman Catholic). Eccleston Methodist Church closed in May 2006. The former United Reformed Church on Kiln Lane closed in 2005 and the site has now been redeveloped into retirement homes. Ethnicity is approximately 98% British/Irish White. The Eccleston Carmelite Monastery, founded in 1914 at Springfield House, former home to the Walmesley-Cotham family, closed in 2015.

Community activities revolve around church and school festivals and fêtes. The Lester Drive Centre is run by Eccleston Old People's Welfare Committee.

In terms of sport, the area is home to the amateur Rugby League team Eccleston Lions. There are also teams for the youngsters of Eccleston, including Millfields and Bleak Hill.

== Education ==
Eccleston has some of the best primary schools in the borough, including one of the top three primary schools, Eccleston Mere. Other schools include St. Julie and Eccleston Lane Ends. De La Salle High School is also located in Eccleston. Schools in the area have good outdoor, IT, special needs and catering facilities.

== Famous people ==
Richard Seddon (1845–1906), 15th Prime Minister of New Zealand, was born in Eccleston and attended the local grammar school. He donated the choir stalls to Christ Church Eccleston which are decorated with carvings of symbols of New Zealand.

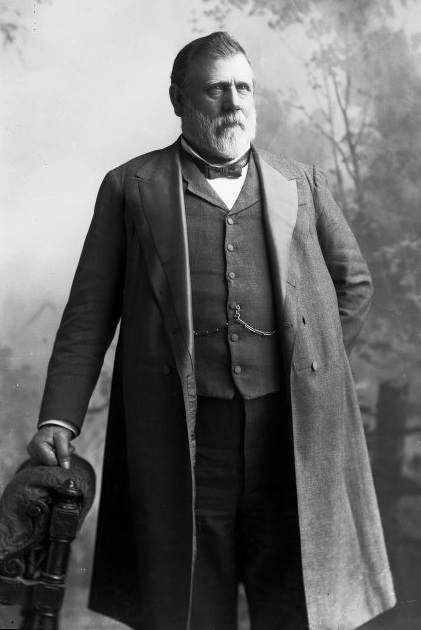
Richard John Seddon, New Zealand Prime Minister 1893–1906, was born in Eccleston.

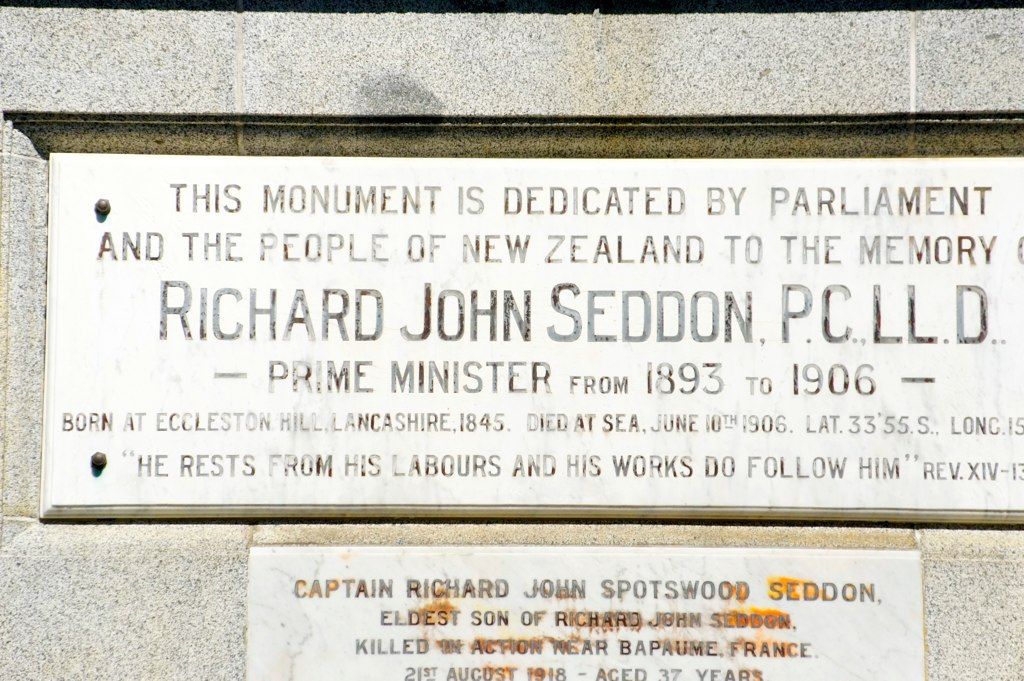
Plaque dedicated to Richard John Seddon, the Prime Minister of New Zealand born in Eccleston.

== See also ==
- Listed buildings in Eccleston, St Helens
