= Samuel Cheetham (footballer) =

English footballer

Personal information
- Date of birth: 1896
- Place of birth: Thatto Heath, England
- Height: 5 ft 10 in (1.78 m)
- Position: Right back

Senior career*
Years	Team	Apps	(Gls)
- Hull City
1921–1926	Bradford City	57	(9)
- Colwyn Bay
- * Club domestic league appearances and goals

Samuel Cheetham (born 1896) was an English professional footballer who played as a right back.

== Career ==
Born in Thatto Heath, Cheetham played for Hull City, Bradford City and Colwyn Bay. For Bradford City, he made 57 appearances in the Football League, scoring 9 goals; he also made 7 FA Cup appearances, scoring 3 goals.

== Sources ==
- Frost, Terry (1988). Bradford City A Complete Record 1903-1988. Breedon Books Sport. ISBN 0-907969-38-0.
