= 2004 St Helens Metropolitan Borough Council election =

Map of the results of the 2004 St Helens Metropolitan Borough Council election. Labour in red, Liberal Democrats in yellow and Conservatives in blue.

The 2004 St Helens Metropolitan Borough Council election took place on 10 June 2004 to elect members of St Helens Metropolitan Borough Council in Merseyside, England. The whole council was up for election with boundary changes since the last election in 2003 reducing the number of seats by six. The Labour Party lost overall control of the council to no overall control.

== Background ==
Since the 2003 election boundary changes reduced the number of councillors from 54 to 48, while also reducing the number of wards from 18 to 16.

== Election result ==
Labour lost their majority of the council, after losing 9 seats to take exactly half of the seats on the council, with 24 councillors. The Labour leader of the council, Marie Rimmer held her seat in West Park after 3 recounts, while Labour councillors Terry Hanley, Jeff Molyneux and Marlene Quinn were among those to be defeated. Meanwhile, the Liberal Democrats gained 3 seats to have 18 councillors and the Conservatives won 6 seats. Overall turnout at the election dropped to 40% from 48% in 2003, despite the election being held with all postal voting as in 2003.

Following the election Labour continued to run the council with all of the executive being Labour councillors, after an agreement between the Labour and Conservative group leaders. This saw Conservative Betty Lowe becoming the new mayor, but only after agreeing not to use her vote at full council meetings.

St Helens local election result 2004
Party	Seats	Gains	Losses	Net gain/loss	Seats %	Votes %	Votes	+/−
Labour	24			-9	50.0	42.3	55,950	-6.2%
Liberal Democrats	18			+3	37.5	40.0	52,918	+6.6%
Conservative	6			0	12.5	15.6	20,614	-1.4%
Independent	0			0	0	1.5	2,021	+0.6%
UKIP	0			0	0	0.3	429	+0.3%
BNP	0			0	0	0.2	328	+0.2%

== Ward results ==
Billinge and Seneley Green (3 seats)
Party	Candidate	Votes	%	±%
Labour	Bessie Griffin	1,503		
Labour	Alma Atherton	1,492		
Labour	Susan Murphy	1,229		
Independent	James Stevenson	917		
Conservative	David Davies	905		
Conservative	Michael Hodgson	893		
Conservative	James Spanner	878		
Liberal Democrats	Michael Bagot	651		
Liberal Democrats	Gail Mills	454		
Liberal Democrats	Katrina Young	409		
Turnout		9,331	41.7	

Blackbrook (3 seats)
Party	Candidate	Votes	%	±%
Labour	Andrew Bowden	1,352		
Labour	Linda Maloney	1,310		
Labour	Albert Smith	1,305		
Liberal Democrats	Ruth Smith	1,156		
Liberal Democrats	Joanne Hankinson	884		
Liberal Democrats	Vivienne Lavery	883		
Conservative	Joan Foster	416		
Turnout		7,256	35.9	

Bold (3 seats)
Party	Candidate	Votes	%	±%
Labour	Thomas Hargreaves	1,107		
Liberal Democrats	Stephen Topping	1,052		
Liberal Democrats	Matthew Dunn	1,019		
Liberal Democrats	Thomas King	955		
Labour	John Wiseman	951		
Labour	Paul Pritchard	926		
Conservative	Jill Jones	244		
Turnout		6,254	34.1	

Earlestown (3 seats)
Party	Candidate	Votes	%	±%
Labour	Leon McGuire	1,214		
Labour	Keith Deakin	1,106		
Labour	Charles Banks	1,078		
Liberal Democrats	Virginia Taylor	795		
Liberal Democrats	David Smith	783		
Liberal Democrats	David Crowther	775		
Conservative	Catherine Perks	359		
Turnout		6,110	33.5	

Eccleston (3 seats)
Party	Candidate	Votes	%	±%
Liberal Democrats	Teresa Sims	3,317		
Liberal Democrats	Shirley Evans	3,030		
Liberal Democrats	Geoffrey Pearl	2,718		
Conservative	Kathleen Barton	867		
Conservative	Michael Marriott	687		
Labour	Ellen Glover	645		
Labour	Keith Cottom	617		
Labour	Patricia Ireland	517		
Turnout		12,398	49.6	

Haydock (3 seats)
Party	Candidate	Votes	%	±%
Labour	James Caunce	1,564		
Labour	William Swift	1,400		
Liberal Democrats	Eric Sheldon	1,219		
Labour	Janet Richardson	1,177		
Liberal Democrats	Thomas Duffy	1,148		
Liberal Democrats	Janet Sheldon	1,129		
Conservative	Anthony Rigby	378		
Turnout		8,015	37.7	

Moss Bank (3 seats)
Party	Candidate	Votes	%	±%
Liberal Democrats	Carole Kavanagh	2,077		
Liberal Democrats	Eric Simpson	1,685		
Liberal Democrats	Richard Ferry	1,566		
Labour	Barbara Jakubiak	1,327		
Labour	Brian Hart	1,188		
Labour	Sandra Banawich	1,047		
Conservative	William Highcock	353		
Turnout		9,243	42.7	

Newton (3 seats)
Party	Candidate	Votes	%	±%
Liberal Democrats	Suzanne Knight	2,034		
Liberal Democrats	Peter Astbury	1,783		
Liberal Democrats	Neil Taylor	1,654		
Labour	Jeanette Banks	810		
Labour	Mark Rahaman	803		
Labour	Stuart Hughes	758		
Conservative	Brian Honey	355		
Conservative	Margaret Harvey	298		
Turnout		8,495	40.6	

Parr (3 seats)
Party	Candidate	Votes	%	±%
Labour	John Pinder	1,604		
Labour	Keith Roberts	1,236		
Labour	Terence Shields	1,217		
Liberal Democrats	Paul Brown	684		
Liberal Democrats	Ethel Clarke	409		
Liberal Democrats	Stephen Knowles	381		
Conservative	Madeleine Wilcock	215		
Turnout		5,746	30.2	

Rainford (3 seats)
Party	Candidate	Votes	%	±%
Conservative	Betty Lowe	2,131		
Conservative	John Brown	2,021		
Conservative	John Parr	1,900		
Labour	David Wood	955		
Labour	Keith Aspinall	898		
Labour	Mary Newby	886		
Liberal Democrats	Frederick Barrett	342		
Liberal Democrats	Malcolm Dunn	310		
Liberal Democrats	Gary Pulfer	277		
Turnout		9,720	51.0	

Rainhill (3 seats)
Party	Candidate	Votes	%	±%
Labour	Michael Doyle	2,372		
Labour	Joseph De Asha	2,153		
Labour	Stephen Glover	1,433		
Independent	Neil Thompson	908		
Conservative	Gaynor Parr	793		
Conservative	Henry Spriggs	763		
Liberal Democrats	Christina Duncan	735		
Liberal Democrats	Darren Makin	622		
Liberal Democrats	Majorie Beirne	524		
Turnout		10,303	42.1	

Sutton (3 seats)
Party	Candidate	Votes	%	±%
Liberal Democrats	Brian Spencer	1,917		
Liberal Democrats	Stephanie Topping	1,821		
Liberal Democrats	Julie Jones	1,756		
Labour	Derek Maylor	983		
Labour	Philip Wiseman	941		
Labour	Michael Glover	935		
Conservative	Pauline Wilcock	234		
Independent	Alan Brooks	196		
Turnout		8,783	37.8	

Thatto Heath (3 seats)
Party	Candidate	Votes	%	±%
Labour	Sheila Seddon	1,406		
Labour	Patricia Robinson	1,351		
Labour	Richard McCauley	1,139		
Liberal Democrats	Carol Pearl	713		
Liberal Democrats	Noreen Knowles	502		
UKIP	Ann Fleetwood	429		
Liberal Democrats	Sandra Ferry	380		
Conservative	Barbara Woodcock	326		
Turnout		6,246	34.2	

Town Centre (3 seats)
Party	Candidate	Votes	%	±%
Liberal Democrats	John Beirne	1,173		
Labour	John Fletcher	1,099		
Labour	Margaret McLachlan	1,027		
Labour	Jeffrey Molyneux	1,024		
Liberal Democrats	Mandy Stanley	992		
Liberal Democrats	Alec Mills	958		
BNP	Michael Pearcey	328		
Conservative	Richard Seddon	195		
Turnout		6,796	32.8	

West Park (3 seats)
Party	Candidate	Votes	%	±%
Liberal Democrats	Lesley Ronan	1,395		
Liberal Democrats	David Evans	1,391		
Labour	Marie Rimmer	1,374		
Labour	Marlene Quinn	1,312		
Labour	Terence Hanley	1,278		
Liberal Democrats	Stephen Broughton	1,265		
Conservative	Charmian Pyke	451		
Turnout		8,466	38.7	

Windle (3 seats)
Party	Candidate	Votes	%	±%
Conservative	Wallace Ashcroft	1,757		
Conservative	Nancy Ashcroft	1,682		
Conservative	Kenneth Roughley	1,513		
Labour	Geoffrey Almond	1,160		
Labour	Jean West	871		
Labour	Mark Arnold	870		
Liberal Democrats	Kenneth Knowles	484		
Liberal Democrats	Darren Jackson	381		
Liberal Democrats	Marise Roberts	330		
Turnout		9,048	42.5	
