= Metropolitan Borough of St Helens =

Borough of St Helens
- Metropolitan borough
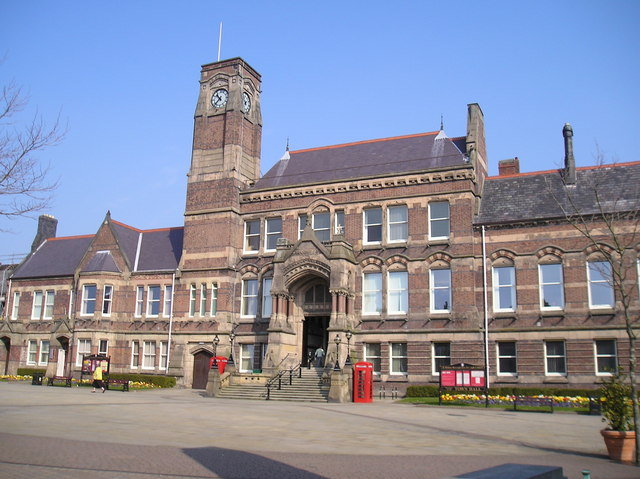
- St Helens Town Hall

- Coat of arms
- Motto: Latin: Ex Terra Lucem, lit. 'From the Earth, Light'
- St Helens shown within Merseyside
- Coordinates: 53.454°N 2.746°W
- Sovereign state: United Kingdom
- Country: England
- Region: North West
- Ceremonial county: Merseyside
- City region: Liverpool
- Incorporated: 1 April 1974
- Named for: St Helens
- Administrative HQ: St Helens Town Hall

Government
  - Type: Metropolitan borough
  - Body: St Helens Borough Council
  - Executive: Leader and cabinet
  - Control: Reform UK
  - Mayor: Seve Gomez-Aspron (2025/2026)
  - MPs: David Baines (L); Marie Rimmer (L)

Area
  - Total: 136 km^{2} (53 sq mi)
  - Rank: 174th

Population (2025)
  - Total: 189,890
  - Rank: 113th
  - Density: 1,393/km^{2} (3,610/sq mi)

Ethnicity (2021)
  - Ethnic groups: List: 96.5% White; 1.4% Asian; 1.1% Mixed; 0.4% Black; 0.6% other

Religion (2021)
  - Religion: List: 62.3% Christianity; 31.2% no religion; 0.7% Islam; 0.3% Hinduism; 0.3% Buddhism; 0.0% Judaism; 0.0% Sikhism; 0.4% other; 4.7% not stated
- Time zone: UTC+0 (GMT)
  - Summer (DST): UTC+1 (BST)
- Postcode areas: L; WA; WN
- Dialling codes: 0151; 01744; 01925; 01942
- ISO 3166 code: GB-SHN
- GSS code: E08000013
- Website: sthelens.gov.uk

The Metropolitan Borough of St Helens is a local government district with borough status in Merseyside, North West England. The borough is named after its largest settlement, St Helens. It is one of the six boroughs of the Liverpool City Region.

Other towns and villages in St Helens include Earlestown, Rainhill, Eccleston, Clock Face, Haydock, Billinge, Garswood, Rainford and Newton-le-Willows.

== History ==
The Metropolitan Borough was formed on 1 April 1974 as a merger of the former County Borough of St Helens, along with the urban districts of Haydock, Newton-le-Willows and Rainford, and parts of Billinge-and-Winstanley and Ashton-in-Makerfield urban districts, along with part of Whiston Rural District, all from the administrative county of Lancashire.

Between 1974 and 1986 (when it was abolished), the borough council shared functions with Merseyside County Council. After abolition, the functions of this body were in part devolved to the boroughs and in part transferred to ad hoc agencies.

== Governance ==
=== St Helens Metropolitan Borough Council composition ===
The Metropolitan Borough Council is made up of 48 councillors, three representing each of the 16 wards. Elections to St Helens Metropolitan Borough Council are held in three out of every four years, with one-third of the 48 seats on the council being elected at each election.

The Labour Party has had a majority on the council since the first election in 1973, except for a period between the 2004 election and the 2010 election when no party had a majority. This allowed an alliance between the Liberal Democrats and the Conservatives to take control after the 2006 election until Labour regained control in 2010.

Since then Labour has lost its majority position on the council, and following the 2022 election the council is composed of the following councillors:

| Party | Councillors |
|---|---|
| Labour | 2 |
| Independent | 6 |
| Liberal Democrats | 3 |
| Conservative | 1 |
| Reform | 34 |
| Total | 48 |

(2 are to be declared at a later date)

=== Parliamentary constituencies ===
The members of parliament who represent St Helens are:

- St Helens North - David Baines MP
- St Helens South and Whiston - Marie Rimmer MP

=== Liverpool City Region Combined Authority ===
The Metropolitan Borough of St Helens is one of the six constituent local government districts of the Liverpool City Region. Since 1 April 2014, some of the borough's responsibilities have been pooled with neighbouring authorities and subsumed into the Liverpool City Region Combined Authority.

The combined authority has effectively become the top-tier administrative body for the local governance of the city region, and the leader of St Helens Metropolitan Borough Council, along with the five other leaders from neighbouring local government districts, takes strategic decisions over economic development, transport, employment and skills, tourism, culture, housing and physical infrastructure.

=== Mayor of the Liverpool City Region ===
As a district of the Liverpool City Region it is also governed by the Mayor of the Liverpool City Region who serves as the mayor of the region. The incumbent mayor is Steve Rotheram of the Labour Party.

== Geography ==
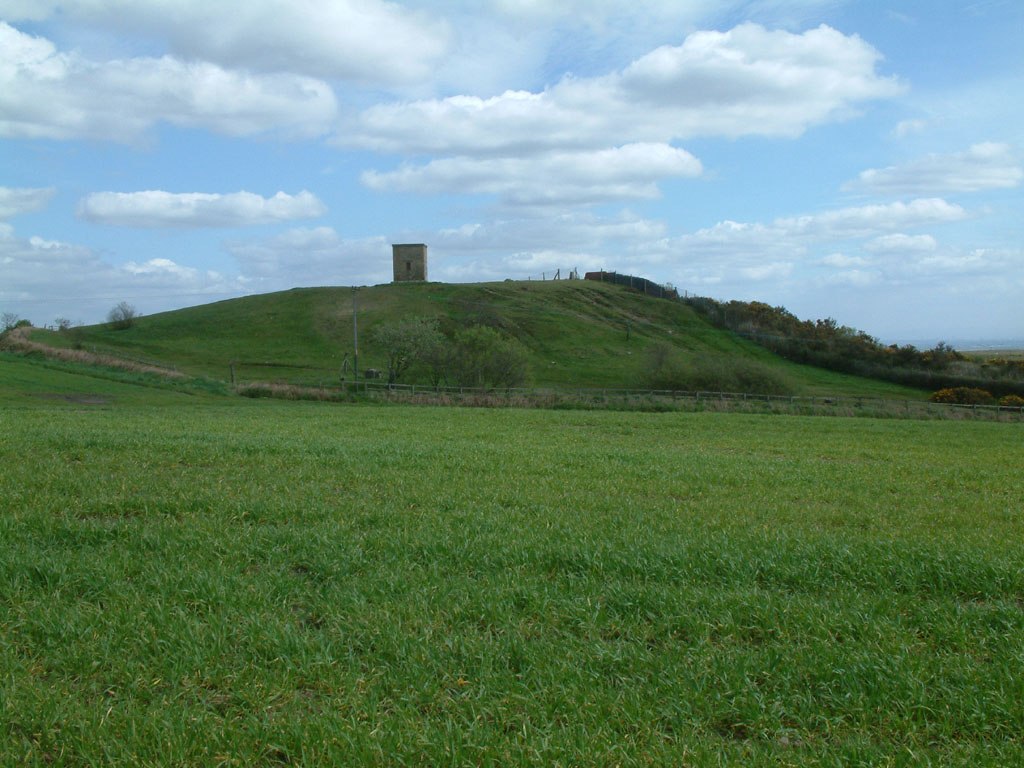
'Billinge Lump' is the highest point in St Helens and Merseyside

The borough borders the borough of Knowsley, in the south-west, the district of West Lancashire in the north, the Borough of Wigan in the north-east, and to the south the boroughs of Warrington and Halton.

The St Helens Borough covers roughly 30 km^{2} over an area of soft rolling hills used primarily for agricultural purposes, mainly arable. The highest point in the Metropolitan Borough of St Helens, and the whole of Merseyside, is Billinge Hill, 4.5 miles (7.2 km) north from St. Helens centre. The borough is landlocked with a stream running through, Mill Brook/Windle Brook running through Eccleston and connecting with the (disused) St. Helens Branch/Section of the Sankey Canal in the town centre. The centre of St Helens is around 160 feet (50 m) above sea level.

From the top of Billinge Hill the cities of Manchester and Liverpool are visible on a clear day as well as the towns of Bolton and Warrington.

Carr Mill Dam is Merseyside's largest body of inland water, offering picturesque lakeside trails and walks as well as national competitive powerboating and angling events.

The Burgies are two tailings on the site of the old Rushy Park coal mine. They were created by the dumping of toxic chemical waste from the manufacture of glass, they have since been covered with tall grass and woodland.

== Demography ==
St Helens Population using 2011 Data, 2008 Wards
| **2001 UK Census** | **Population** | **Households** |
| Billinge and Seneley Green | 12,717 | 4985 |
| Blackbrook | 9,128 | 3,604 |
| Bold | 9,040 | 3,586 |
| Earlestown | 10,274 | 4,420 |
| Eccleston | 10,528 | 4,218 |
| Haydock | 11,962 | 4,817 |
| Moss Bank | 10,276 | 4,337 |
| Newton | 22,144 | 4,506 |
| Parr | 18,082 | 3,541 |
| Rainford | 7,779 | 3,484 |
| Rainhill | 11,913 | 4,762 |
| Sutton | 12,622 | 5,075 |
| Thatto Heath | 9,393 | 3,852 |
| Town Centre | 13,795 | 4,958 |
| West Park | 4,558 | 4,947 |
| Windle | 6,621 | 3,607 |
| **Total** | 176,843 | 72,697 |

=== Ethnicity ===
| Ethnic Group | 2001 | | 2011 | | 2021 | |
| Ethnic Group | Number | % | Number | % | Number | % |
|---|---|---|---|---|---|---|
| White: British | 172,853 | 97.74% | 169,346 | 96.59% | 171,546 | 93.61% |
| White: Irish | 1,054 | 0.60% | 887 | 0.50% | 945 | 0.52% |
| White: Gypsy or Irish Traveller | | | 69 | 0.04% | 145 | 0.08% |
| White: Roma | | | | | 67 | 0.04% |
| White: Other | 880 | 0.50% | 1,575 | 0.90% | 4,185 | 2.28% |
| **White: Total** | **174,787** | **98.84%** | **171,887** | **98.05%** | **176,888** | **96.53%** |
| Asian or Asian British: Indian | 409 | 0.23% | 504 | 0.29% | 557 | 0.30% |
| Asian or Asian British: Pakistani | 109 | 0.06% | 133 | 0.08% | 238 | 0.13% |
| Asian or Asian British: Bangladeshi | 79 | 0.04% | 122 | 0.07% | 172 | 0.09% |
| Asian or Asian British: Chinese | 398 | 0.23% | 512 | 0.29% | 660 | 0.36% |
| Asian or Asian British: Other Asian | 85 | 0.05% | 493 | 0.28% | 952 | 0.52% |
| **Asian or Asian British: Total** | **1,080** | **0.61%** | **1,764** | **1.01%** | **2,579** | **1.41%** |
| Black or Black British: African | 73 | 0.04% | 152 | 0.09% | 558 | 0.30% |
| Black or Black British: Caribbean | 59 | 0.03% | 60 | 0.03% | 103 | 0.06% |
| Black or Black British: Other Black | 37 | 0.02% | 36 | 0.02% | 115 | 0.06% |
| **Black or Black British: Total** | **169** | **0.10%** | **248** | **0.14%** | **776** | **0.42%** |
| Mixed: White and Black Caribbean | 228 | 0.13% | 445 | 0.25% | 466 | 0.25% |
| Mixed: White and Black African | 77 | 0.04% | 167 | 0.10% | 417 | 0.23% |
| Mixed: White and Asian | 200 | 0.11% | 271 | 0.15% | 597 | 0.33% |
| Mixed: Other Mixed | 169 | 0.10% | 296 | 0.17% | 491 | 0.27% |
| **Mixed: Total** | **674** | **0.38%** | **1,179** | **0.67%** | **1,971** | **1.08%** |
| Other: Arab | | | 117 | 0.07% | 377 | 0.21% |
| Other: Any other ethnic group | | | 123 | 0.07% | 657 | 0.36% |
| **Other: Total** | **133** | **0.08%** | **240** | **0.14%** | **1,034** | **0.56%** |
| **Black, Asian, and minority ethnic: Total** | **2,056** | **1.16%** | **3,431** | **1.96%** | **6,360** | **3.47%** |
| **Total** | **176,843** | **100.00%** | **175,308** | **100.00%** | **183,248** | **100.00%** |

== Coat of arms ==
Coat of arms of St Helens Metropolitan Borough Council
| Crest Issuing from an ancient crown Or a ram's head Argent armed Or charged on the neck with two fleur de lys Gules and holding in the mouth a slip of laurel Proper; mantled Azure doubled Argent. Escutcheon Argent two bars Azure overall a cross Sable in the first quarter a saltire couped Gules in the second quarter a griffin segreant Sable beaked and armed Or in the third quarter a cross flory Gules voided and in the fourth quarter a cross crosslet fitchy also Gules. Supporters On the dexter a lion guardant Or charged with seven fleur de lys Gules and on the sinister a griffin Sable armed Or the wings barry of seven Sable and Or. Motto 'Ex Terra Lucem' |

The coat of arms of St Helens Metropolitan Borough Council was adopted in 1974. The crest above the helmet is that of Lord Newton representing Newton U.D.C. and Haydock U.D.C. The crest is suitably differenced by the inclusion of two red (gules) fleur-de-lys on the body of the ram.

The escutcheon is split into quarters by the Black (sable) Cross of Haydock & Eccleston and the Blue (azure) Bars of Parr. Each quarter contains a different charge:

- First Quarter: a saltire couped Gules - representing Ashton and Seneley Green,
- Second Quarter: a griffin Sable - representing Rainhill,
- Third Quarter: a cross flory - representing Windle,
- Fourth Quarter: a cross crosslet fitchy - representing Billinge.

Beneath the escutcheon is a scroll bearing the motto ' Ex Terra Lucem ' meaning 'From the Earth, Light'.

== Twin Town ==
St Helens is twinned with:

- Stuttgart, Germany

== Freedom of the Borough ==
The following people, military units and Organisations and Groups have received the Freedom of the Borough of St Helens.

=== Individuals ===
- Lord Pilkington of St Helens: 1968.
- John Evans, Baron Evans of Parkside: 1997.
- David Watts, Baron Watts: 13 May 2022.
- James Roby: 1 December 2023.
- Michael Smith: 1 December 2023.
- Marie Rimmer: 1 December 2023.

=== Military Units ===
- The Royal Military Police Association (Merseyside Branch): 29 February 2012.
- The Duke of Lancaster's Regiment: 1 December 2023.

=== Organisations and Groups ===
- The St Helens and Knowsley Teaching Hospitals NHS Trust: 13 May 2022.
