= St Helens Borough Council elections =

Local government elections in Merseyside, England

St Helens Metropolitan Borough Council elections are held every four years. St Helens Metropolitan Borough Council, which styles itself St Helens Borough Council, is the local authority for the metropolitan borough of St Helens in Merseyside, England. Since the last boundary changes in 2022, 48 councillors have been elected from 18 wards. Prior to the 2022 boundary changes, elections were held three years out of every four, with a third of the council being elected each time.

== Council elections ==
Summary of the council composition after each council election, click on the year for full details of each election.

Year	Labour	Reform	Liberal Democrat ‡	Conservative	Green	Independent	Others		Notes
1973	36	N/A	0	8	0	1	0		
1975	30	N/A	1	13	0	1	0		
1976	26	N/A	1	17	0	1	0		
1978	24	N/A	1	20	0	0	0		
1979	27	N/A	0	18	0	0	0		
1980	43	N/A	0	11	0	0	0		New ward boundaries increased seats from 45 to 54.
1982	41	N/A	2	11	0	0	0		
1983	41	N/A	2	11	0	0	0		
1984	41	N/A	2	11	0	0	0		
1986	45	N/A	0	9	0	0	0		
1987	44	N/A	2	8	0	0	0		
1988	40	N/A	6	8	0	0	0		
1990	38	N/A	10	6	0	0	0		
1991	34	N/A	15	5	0	0	0		
1992	33	N/A	15	6	0	0	0		
1994	33	N/A	14	5	0	0	2		
1995	40	N/A	10	3	0	0	1	Liberal (1989)	
1996	44	N/A	9	1	0	0	0		
1998	42	N/A	10	2	0	0	0		
1999	37	N/A	14	3	0	0	0		
2000	35	N/A	15	4	0	0	0		
2002	33	N/A	15	5	0	0	1	Socialist Labour	
2003	33	N/A	15	6	0	0	0		
2004	24	N/A	18	6	0	0	0		New ward boundaries reduced seats from 54 to 48.
2006	23	N/A	19	6	0	0	0		
2007	21	N/A	20	6	0	1	0		
2008	23	N/A	19	6	0	0	0		
2010	28	N/A	15	5	0	0	0		
2011	35	N/A	9	4	0	0	0		
2012	40	N/A	5	3	0	0	0		
2014	42	N/A	3	3	0	0	0		
2015	42	N/A	3	3	0	0	0		
2016	42	N/A	3	3	0	0	0		
2018	41	N/A	3	3	0	1	0		
2019	37	0	4	3	2	2	0		
2021	35	0	4	3	3	3	0		
2022	29	0	4	2	6	7	0		New ward boundaries and change to elections every four years.
2026	2	34	3	1	0	6	2	Vacant	Election deferred in Town Centre Ward due to the death of a candidate.

‡Includes Liberal Party and Social Democratic Party pre-1988.

== Borough result maps ==
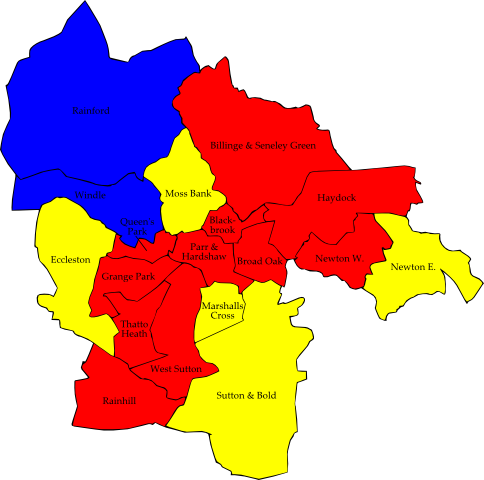
2002 results map

2004 results map

2006 results map

2007 results map

2008 results map

2010 results map

2011 results map

2012 results map

2014 results map

2015 results map

2016 results map

2018 results map

2019 results map

2021 results map

2022 results map

2026 results map

== By-election results ==
By-elections occur when seats become vacant between council elections. Below is a summary of recent by-elections; full by-election results can be found by clicking on the by-election name.

By-election	Date	Incumbent party	Winning party
Marshalls Cross by-election	21 January 1999	Liberal Democrats	Liberal Democrats
Newton West by-election	21 January 1999	Labour	Liberal Democrats
Thatto Heath by-election	21 January 1999	Labour	Labour
Marshalls Cross by-election	19 September 2002	Liberal Democrats	Liberal Democrats
Rainford by-election	23 November 2006	Conservative	Conservative
Parr by-election	12 March 2009	Labour	Labour
Rainhill by-election	12 March 2009	Labour	Labour
Moss Bank by-election	16 July 2009	Liberal Democrats	Liberal Democrats
Billinge and Seneley Green by-election	14 October 2010	Labour	Labour
Haydock by-election	2 December 2010	Labour	Labour
Windle by-election	2 May 2013	Labour	Labour
Billinge and Seneley Green by-election	28 November 2013	Labour	Labour
Thatto Heath Green by-election	21 January 2016	Labour	Labour
Moss Bank by-election	20 October 2022	Labour	Labour
Windle by-election	4 July 2024	Labour	Labour
Blackbrook by-election	12 December 2024	Labour	Reform
Sutton South East by-election	3 April 2025	Liberal Democrats	Reform
Haydock by-election	25 June 2026	Reform	Reform
Billinge and Seneley Green by-election	27 August 2026	Reform	Labour
