= 2022 St Helens Metropolitan Borough Council election =

2022 local election in St Helens

- 5 May 2022
Party	Labour	Independent	Green
Popular vote	50,667	14,839	11,368
Percentage	52.5%	15.4%	11.8%
Party	Liberal Democrats	Conservative
Popular vote	9,531	9,889
Percentage	9.9%	10.3%
- Winner of each seat at the 2022 St Helens Metropolitan Borough Council election
council control before election
Labour
Subsequent council control
Labour

The 2022 St Helens Metropolitan Borough Council election took place on 5 May 2022. Due to boundary changes, all 48 councillors were elected at the same time, with the council moving to a system of all-out elections every four years. The election took place alongside other local elections across the United Kingdom.

In the previous council election in 2021, Labour maintained its control of the council, holding 35 seats after the election. The Liberal Democrats where the Opposition with 4 Seats while the Greens, Conservatives and Rainhill Independents had 3 Each, Earlestown Independents had 1.

== Background ==
Result of the 2021 council election

The Local Government Act 1972 created a two-tier system of metropolitan counties and districts covering Greater Manchester, Merseyside, South Yorkshire, Tyne and Wear, the West Midlands, and West Yorkshire starting in 1974. St Helens was a district of the Merseyside metropolitan county. The Local Government Act 1985 abolished the metropolitan counties, with metropolitan districts taking on most of their powers as metropolitan boroughs. The Liverpool City Region Combined Authority was created in 2014 and began electing the mayor of the Liverpool City Region from 2017. The body was given strategic powers covering a region that encompassed the former Merseyside metropolitan county with the addition of Halton Borough Council.

Since its formation, St Helens has continuously been under Labour control apart from a period of no overall control from 2004 to 2010. Labour continued to run the council from 2004 until the 2005 election, when the Liberal Democrats formed a coalition with the Conservatives in an arrangement that lasted until Labour regained control of the council in the 2010 election. In the most recent election in 2021, Labour lost three seats but maintained their majority. Of the seventeen seats up for election—sixteen on the normal thirds schedule and one by-election on the same date—Labour won twelve, independent candidates won two and the Liberal Democrats, Conservatives and Greens won one seat each.

St Helens council underwent boundary changes ahead of this election. The Local Government Boundary Commission for England determined that the council should continue to elect 48 councillors and designed new election boundaries to reflect population change. The new boundaries include thirteen three-member wards, four two-member wards and one single-member ward. The new boundaries will be used for all-out elections every four years instead of the previous model of election a third of councillors in each of three years out of four.

== Electoral process ==
The council previously elected its councillors in thirds, with a third being up for election every year for three years, with no election in the fourth year. However, following a boundary review, all forty-eight councillors were elected at the same time. The election took place by multi-member first-past-the-post voting, with each ward being represented by up to three councillors. Electors were able to vote for as many candidates as there were seats to fill, and the candidates with the most votes in each ward were elected.

All registered electors (British, Irish, Commonwealth and European Union citizens) living in St Helens aged 18 or over were entitled to vote in the election. People who lived at two addresses in different councils, such as university students with different term-time and holiday addresses, were entitled to be registered for and vote in elections in both local authorities. Voting in-person at polling stations took place from 07:00 to 22:00 on election day, and voters were able to apply for postal votes or proxy votes in advance of the election.

== Election result ==
2022 St Helens Metropolitan Borough Council election
Party	Candidates	Seats	Gains	Losses	Net gain/loss	Seats %	Votes %	Votes	+/−
Labour	45	29	N/A	N/A	▼6	59.2	52.9	50,667	+11.1
Independent	10	7	N/A	N/A	▲4	16.3	15.5	14,839	+6.2
Green	11	6	N/A	N/A	▲3	12.2	10.8	10,369	–6.7
Liberal Democrats	7	4	N/A	N/A	Steady	8.2	9.9	9,531	+1.3
Conservative	20	2	N/A	N/A	▼1	4.1	10.7	10,222	–11.3
For Britain	1	0	N/A	N/A	Steady	0.0	0.2	176	±0.0

== Ward results ==
=== Billinge and Seneley Green ===
Billinge and Seneley Green
Party	Candidate	Votes	%	±%
Independent	Peter Peers	1,424	45.8	
Labour	Sue Murphy	1,388	44.6	
Independent	Collin Richard Betts	1,352	43.5	
Labour	Dennis McDonnell	1,220	39.2	
Independent	Malcolm James Webster	988	31.8	
Labour	Gareth William Cross	980	31.5	
Conservative	Denise Anne Gibney	646	20.8	
Majority				
Turnout		3,111		
Independent win (new seat)				
Labour win (new seat)				
Independent win (new seat)				

=== Blackbrook ===
Blackbrook
Party	Candidate	Votes	%	±%
Labour	Anthony James Burns	1,309	59.0	
Labour	Paul McQuade	1,262	56.9	
Labour	Linda Lovina Maloney	1,255	56.6	
Green	Emma Carolyn Van Der Burg	715	32.2	
Green	Jessica Northey	707	31.9	
Conservative	Melanie Ann Marie Lee	442	19.9	
Majority				
Turnout		2,219		
Labour win (new seat)				
Labour win (new seat)				
Labour win (new seat)				

=== Bold and Lea Green ===
Bold and Lea Green
Party	Candidate	Votes	%	±%
Green	David Edward Hawley	1,209	48.0	
Green	Allen John Makin	1,176	46.7	
Green	Glen Roger Richards	1,120	44.5	
Labour	Jim Housley	1,084	43.1	
Labour	Lisa Preston	1,032	41.0	
Labour	Charlie Preston	983	39.0	
Conservative	Barbara Evelyn Woodcock	329	13.1	
Majority				
Turnout		2,518		
Green win (new seat)				
Green win (new seat)				
Green win (new seat)				

=== Eccleston ===
Eccleston
Party	Candidate	Votes	%	±%
Liberal Democrats	Michael Haw	2,252	74.1	
Liberal Democrats	Teresa Veronica Sims	2,178	71.6	
Liberal Democrats	Geoff Pearl	1,938	63.7	
Labour	Glyn Robert Jones	732	24.1	
Conservative	Mackenzie France	391	12.9	
Majority				
Turnout		3,041		
Liberal Democrats win (new seat)				
Liberal Democrats win (new seat)				
Liberal Democrats win (new seat)				

=== Haydock ===
Haydock
Party	Candidate	Votes	%	±%
Green	Paul Robert Hooton	1,485	59.1	
Green	Janet Ann Sheldon	1,445	57.5	
Green	David Ian Van Der Burg	1,357	54.0	
Labour	Matthew Peter Butterworth	834	33.2	
Labour	Paul Joseph Pritchard	762	30.3	
Labour	Amy Sample	756	30.1	
Conservative	Judith Margaret Collins	287	11.4	
Majority				
Turnout		2,513		
Green win (new seat)				
Green win (new seat)				
Green win (new seat)				

=== Moss Bank ===
Moss Bank
Party	Candidate	Votes	%	±%
Labour	Tracy Paula Dickinson	1,547	63.4	
Labour	Trisha Long	1,476	60.5	
Labour	Zeena Ilsha Begum	1,375	56.4	
Conservative	Margaret Hilda Harvey	514	21.1	
Liberal Democrats	David Kent	494	20.3	
Liberal Democrats	Jane Patricia Kent	460	18.9	
Independent	Paul John Wilcock	419	17.2	
Majority				
Turnout		2,439		
Labour win (new seat)				
Labour win (new seat)				
Labour win (new seat)				

=== Newton-Le-Willows East ===
Newton-Le-Willows East
Party	Candidate	Votes	%	±%
Labour	Jeanie Bell	1,701	56.4	
Labour	Keith Anthony Laird	1,599	53.0	
Labour	Seve Gomez-Aspron	1,560	51.7	
Liberal Democrats	David James Smith	1,393	46.2	
Conservative	Lisa Cunliffe	778	25.8	
Majority				
Turnout		3,016		
Labour win (new seat)				
Labour win (new seat)				
Labour win (new seat)				

=== Newton-Le-Willows West ===
Newton-Le-Willows West
Party	Candidate	Votes	%	±%
Independent	Terry Maguire	1,670	59.1	
Independent	Karl Lionel Collier	1,302	46.0	
Labour	Dave Banks	1,190	42.1	
Labour	Jeanette Susan Banks	1,182	41.8	
Independent	Craig Colin Alexander Smith	1,153	40.8	
Labour	Andy Davidson	1,063	37.6	
Conservative	Allan Albert Dockerty	237	8.4	
Majority				
Turnout		2,828		
Independent win (new seat)				
Independent win (new seat)				
Labour win (new seat)				

=== Parr ===
Parr
Party	Candidate	Votes	%	±%
Labour	Andy Bowden	1,172	79.1	
Labour	Kate Groucutt	1,079	72.9	
Labour	Bisi Osundeko	964	65.1	
Conservative	Madeleine Patricia Wilcock	324	21.9	
Majority				
Turnout		1,481		
Labour win (new seat)				
Labour win (new seat)				
Labour win (new seat)				

=== Peasley Cross and Fingerpost ===
Peasley Cross and Fingerpost
Party	Candidate	Votes	%	±%
Labour	Damien Patrick O'Connor	325	60.6	
Conservative	Iris Brown	107	20.0	
Green	Alison Jill Donnelly	104	19.4	
Majority				
Turnout		536		
Labour win (new seat)				

=== Rainford ===
Rainford
Party	Candidate	Votes	%	±%
Conservative	John Case	1,462	57.2	
Conservative	Anne Linda Mussell	1,450	56.7	
Labour	John Francis Tabern	1,099	43.0	
Majority				
Turnout		2,556		
Conservative win (new seat)				
Conservative win (new seat)				

=== Rainhill ===
Rainhill
Party	Candidate	Votes	%	±%
Independent	James Stephen Tasker	2,336	64.7	
Independent	Donna Greaves	2,133	59.0	
Independent	Kate Elizabeth Stevenson	2,062	57.1	
Labour	Ken Rustidge	1,179	32.6	
Labour	Emma Davies	1,122	31.1	
Labour	Barrie Grunewald	1,029	28.5	
Conservative	Henry Spriggs	333	9.2	
Majority				
Turnout		3,613		
Independent win (new seat)				
Independent win (new seat)				
Independent win (new seat)				

=== St Helens Town Centre ===
St Helens Town Centre
Party	Candidate	Votes	%	±%
Labour	Anne Helen Mccormack	747	71.2	
Labour	Michelle Elaine Sweeney	700	66.7	
Conservative	Nancy Ashcroft	229	21.8	
For Britain	Terence Matthew Oakes	176	16.8	
Majority				
Turnout		1,049		
Labour win (new seat)				
Labour win (new seat)				

=== Sutton North West ===
Sutton North West
Party	Candidate	Votes	%	±%
Labour	Niall Peter Andrew Campbell	645	54.2	
Labour	John William Hodkinson	643	54.0	
Green	Francis Joseph Williams	441	37.0	
Conservative	David Leslie Skeech	320	26.9	
Majority				
Turnout		1,191		
Labour win (new seat)				
Labour win (new seat)				

=== Sutton South East ===
Sutton South East
Party	Candidate	Votes	%	±%
Liberal Democrats	Brian Thomas Spencer	816	58.8	
Labour	Janet Elizabeth Johnson	589	42.4	
Labour	Anthony Albert Johnson	560	40.3	
Conservative	Deepak Shatrugan Gupta	250	18.0	
Majority				
Turnout		1,388		
Liberal Democrats win (new seat)				
Labour win (new seat)				

=== Thatto Heath ===
Thatto Heath
Party	Candidate	Votes	%	±%
Labour	Nova Louise Charlton	1,372	63.6	
Labour	Robyn Oliva Hattersley	1,330	61.7	
Labour	Richard Mccauley	1,317	61.1	
Green	Terence Stephen Price	610	28.3	
Conservative	Samantha Ann Pearson Peet	509	23.6	
Majority				
Turnout		2,156		
Labour win (new seat)				
Labour win (new seat)				
Labour win (new seat)				

=== West Park ===
West Park
Party	Candidate	Votes	%	±%
Labour	Marlene Mary Quinn	1,543	72.4	
Labour	Martin James Bond	1,516	71.2	
Labour	Derek Paul Long	1,348	63.3	
Conservative	Richard Barton	525	24.6	
Majority				
Turnout		2,130		
Labour win (new seat)				
Labour win (new seat)				
Labour win (new seat)				

=== Windle ===
Windle
Party	Candidate	Votes	%	±%
Labour	David Edward Baines	1,503	59.4	
Labour	Lynn Susan Clarke	1,391	52.2	
Labour	Mancyia Uddin	1,204	47.6	
Green	Andrew William Donnelly	999	39.5	
Conservative	John Phillip Cunliffe	756	29.9	
Majority				
Turnout		2,529		
Labour win (new seat)				
Labour win (new seat)				
Labour win (new seat)				

== Previous council composition ==
After 2021 election		Before 2022 election	
Party	Seats	Party	Seats
Labour	35	Labour	33
Liberal Democrats	4	Liberal Democrats	4
Independent	4	Independent	5
Conservative	3	Conservative	3
Green	3	Green	2

== By-elections between 2022 and 2026 ==
=== Moss Bank ===
A by-election was held in Moss Bank on 20 October 2022 after the resignation of Labour councillor Zeena Begum.

Moss Bank by-election 20 October 2022
Party	Candidate	Votes	%	±%
Labour	Jeanette Banks	656	50.3	−1.7
Liberal Democrats	David Kent	571	43.8	+27.2
Conservative	Samantha Peet	78	6.0	−11.3
Majority		85	6.5	
Turnout		1,305		
Labour hold		Swing		

=== Windle ===
A by-election was held in Windle on 4 July 2024 after the resignation of Labour councillor David Baines.

Windle by-election 4 July 2024
Party	Candidate	Votes	%	±%
Labour	Lisa Preston	2,506	53.4	+7.3
Green	Andrew Donnelly	1,012	21.6	−9.1
Conservative	Denise Gibney	725	15.4	−7.8
Liberal Democrats	Phil Cass	451	9.6	+9.6
Majority		1,494	31.8	
Turnout		4,694		
Labour hold		Swing		

=== Blackbrook ===
A by-election was held in Blackbrook on 12 December 2024 after the death of a Labour councillor.

Blackbrook by-election 12 December 2024
Party	Candidate	Votes	%	±%
Reform	Victor Floyd	546	41.1	New
Labour	Sally Yeoman	460	34.7	−18.4
Green	Daniel John Thomas	167	12.6	−16.4
Conservative	Thomas Dodd	102	7.7	−10.2
Independent	Trevor Anthony McLaughlin	52	3.9	New
Majority		86	6.4	
Turnout		1,327		
Reform gain from Labour		Swing	+29.75	

=== Sutton South East ===
A by-election was held in Sutton South East on 3 April 2025 after the death of a Liberal Democrat councillor.

Sutton South East by-election 3 April 2025
Party	Candidate	Votes	%	±%
Reform	John Pinnington	447	44.5	New
Labour	Matt Butterworth	364	36.3	+0.7
Liberal Democrats	David James Smith	147	14.6	−34.7
Conservative	Melanie Ann Lee	46	4.6	−10.4
Majority		83	8.2	
Turnout		1004	17.76%	
Reform gain from Liberal Democrats		Swing		
