= 2003 St Helens Metropolitan Borough Council election =

2003 UK local government election

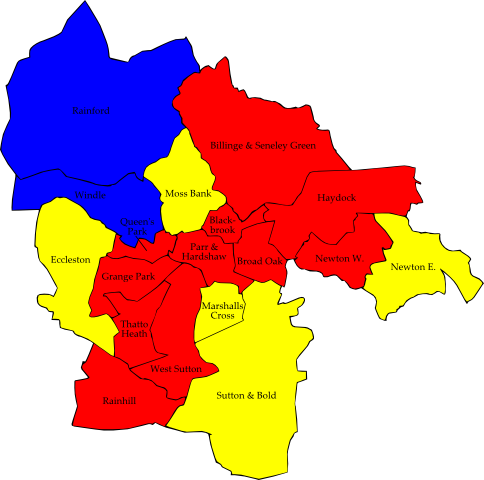
Map of the results of the 2003 St Helens Metropolitan Borough Council election. Labour Party in red, Liberal Democrats in yellow and Conservatives in blue.

The 2003 St Helens Metropolitan Borough Council election took place on 1 May 2003 to elect members of St Helens Metropolitan Borough Council in Merseyside, England. One third of the council was up for election and the Labour Party stayed in overall control of the council.

After the election, the composition of the council was:

- Labour 33
- Liberal Democrats 15
- Conservative 6

== Background ==
Four councillors stood down at the election, Michael Blaney, Patricia Martinez-Williams, John Mealor and Bill Noctor, from Marshalls Cross, Windle, Haydock and West Sutton wards respectively. In Marshalls Cross two seats were contested in 2003, after the death of councillor Valerie Beirne on 7 January 2003 in Whiston Hospital.

Both the Labour and Liberal Democrat parties contested all 19 seats that were up for election, while the Conservatives had 18 candidates and there was 1 Socialist Alliance and 1 independent candidate. The Conservatives targeted gaining a seat in Windle, where the party had taken a seat from Labour for the last two election, while the Liberal Democrats aimed to make progress in Grange Park and Haydock wards.

For the 2003 election, St Helens had a trial of all postal voting across the whole council in an attempt to double the 26% turnout at the last election in 2002. By 29 April 2003 turnout had reached an average of 42% across the council, with the final turnout being 48% and with a high of 57% in Eccleston.

== Election result ==
Labour retained control of the council with 33 councillors after gaining one seat from Socialist Labour, but losing one to the Conservatives. The Labour gain came in Grange Park ward, while the Conservatives took an extra seat in Windle. This meant the Liberal Democrats remained on 15 seats, while the Conservative gain took them to 6 councillors.

St Helens local election result 2003
| Party | Seats | Gains | Losses | Net gain/loss | Seats % | Votes % | Votes | +/− |
|---|---|---|---|---|---|---|---|---|
| Labour | 11 | 1 | 1 | 0 | 57.9 | 48.5 | 32,246 | +0.9% |
| Liberal Democrats | 6 | 0 | 0 | 0 | 31.6 | 33.4 | 22,209 | -1.0% |
| Conservative | 2 | 1 | 0 | +1 | 10.5 | 17.0 | 11,330 | -0.6% |
| Independent | 0 | 0 | 0 | 0 | 0 | 0.9 | 581 | +0.8% |
| Socialist Alliance | 0 | 0 | 0 | 0 | 0 | 0.3 | 168 | +0.3% |
| Socialist Labour | 0 | 0 | 1 | -1 | 0 | 0 | N/A | -0.3% |

== Ward results ==
Billinge and Seneley Green
| Party | Candidate | Votes | % | ±% |
|---|---|---|---|---|
| Labour | Alma Atherton | 2,686 | 59.9 | +0.1 |
| Conservative | Vera Stanton | 1,072 | 23.9 | +0.9 |
| Liberal Democrats | Christine Langley | 728 | 16.2 | −1.0 |
| Majority | | 1,614 | 36.0 | −0.8 |
| Turnout | | 4,486 | | |
| Labour hold | | Swing | | |

Blackbrook
| Party | Candidate | Votes | % | ±% |
|---|---|---|---|---|
| Labour | Albert Smith | 2,046 | 62.7 | −0.7 |
| Liberal Democrats | Matthew Dunn | 791 | 24.2 | −2.7 |
| Conservative | Joan Foster | 426 | 13.1 | +3.4 |
| Majority | | 1,255 | 38.5 | +1.9 |
| Turnout | | 3,263 | | |
| Labour hold | | Swing | | |

Broad Oak
| Party | Candidate | Votes | % | ±% |
|---|---|---|---|---|
| Labour | Terence Shields | 1,885 | 64.2 | +8.5 |
| Liberal Democrats | Gail Mills | 890 | 30.3 | −8.9 |
| Conservative | Mark Collins | 163 | 5.5 | +0.4 |
| Majority | | 995 | 33.9 | +17.5 |
| Turnout | | 2,938 | | |
| Labour hold | | Swing | | |

Eccleston
| Party | Candidate | Votes | % | ±% |
|---|---|---|---|---|
| Liberal Democrats | Shirley Evans | 3,197 | 66.2 | −5.1 |
| Labour | Jean West | 844 | 17.5 | +3.2 |
| Conservative | William Highcock | 788 | 16.3 | +2.0 |
| Majority | | 2,353 | 48.7 | −8.3 |
| Turnout | | 4,829 | 57 | +23 |
| Liberal Democrats hold | | Swing | | |

Grange Park
| Party | Candidate | Votes | % | ±% |
|---|---|---|---|---|
| Labour | Stephen Glover | 1,639 | 49.8 | −2.1 |
| Liberal Democrats | David Evans | 1,192 | 36.2 | +9.0 |
| Conservative | Michael Marriott | 461 | 14.0 | −0.9 |
| Majority | | 447 | 13.6 | −11.1 |
| Turnout | | 3,292 | | |
| Labour gain from Socialist Labour | | Swing | | |

Haydock
| Party | Candidate | Votes | % | ±% |
|---|---|---|---|---|
| Labour | Janet Richardson | 2,325 | 52.9 | −10.3 |
| Liberal Democrats | Eric Sheldon | 1,632 | 37.2 | +14.1 |
| Conservative | Anthony Rigby | 435 | 9.9 | −3.7 |
| Majority | | 693 | 15.8 | −24.3 |
| Turnout | | 4,392 | | |
| Labour hold | | Swing | | |

Marshalls Cross (2 seats)
| Party | Candidate | Votes | % | ±% |
|---|---|---|---|---|
| Liberal Democrats | Stephen Topping | 1,477 | | |
| Liberal Democrats | Alec Mills | 1,421 | | |
| Labour | Michael Glover | 807 | | |
| Labour | Derek Maylor | 689 | | |
| Conservative | Barbara Johnson | 198 | | |
| Turnout | | 4,592 | | |
| Liberal Democrats hold | | Swing | | |
| Liberal Democrats hold | | Swing | | |

Moss Bank
| Party | Candidate | Votes | % | ±% |
|---|---|---|---|---|
| Liberal Democrats | Richard Ferry | 2,026 | 47.0 | −9.4 |
| Labour | Barbara Jakubiak | 1,859 | 43.1 | +5.2 |
| Conservative | John Cunliffe | 425 | 9.9 | +4.2 |
| Majority | | 167 | 3.9 | −14.6 |
| Turnout | | 4,310 | | |
| Liberal Democrats hold | | Swing | | |

Newton East
| Party | Candidate | Votes | % | ±% |
|---|---|---|---|---|
| Liberal Democrats | Peter Astbury | 1,827 | 48.3 | −11.1 |
| Labour | Mark Rahaman | 1,588 | 42.0 | +8.5 |
| Conservative | Margaret Harvey | 370 | 9.8 | +2.6 |
| Majority | | 239 | 6.3 | −19.6 |
| Turnout | | 3,785 | | |
| Liberal Democrats hold | | Swing | | |

Newton West
| Party | Candidate | Votes | % | ±% |
|---|---|---|---|---|
| Labour | Leon Maguire | 2,293 | 60.5 | −1.3 |
| Liberal Democrats | Virginia Taylor | 950 | 25.1 | −1.2 |
| Conservative | Catherine Perks | 547 | 14.4 | +2.5 |
| Majority | | 1,343 | 35.4 | −0.1 |
| Turnout | | 3,790 | | |
| Labour hold | | Swing | | |

Parr and Hardshaw
| Party | Candidate | Votes | % | ±% |
|---|---|---|---|---|
| Labour | Jeffery Molyneux | 1,731 | 69.2 | −2.9 |
| Liberal Democrats | Kenneth Knowles | 419 | 16.7 | −2.4 |
| Conservative | Madeline Wilcock | 185 | 7.4 | +1.2 |
| Socialist Alliance | Leslie Teeling | 168 | 6.7 | +6.7 |
| Majority | | 1,312 | 52.4 | −0.6 |
| Turnout | | 2,503 | | |
| Labour hold | | Swing | | |

Queens Park
| Party | Candidate | Votes | % | ±% |
|---|---|---|---|---|
| Labour | Margaret McLachlan | 1,962 | 61.2 | +6.4 |
| Liberal Democrats | Lesley Ronan | 857 | 26.7 | −9.7 |
| Conservative | Charmian Pyke | 386 | 12.0 | +3.3 |
| Majority | | 1,105 | 34.5 | +16.1 |
| Turnout | | 3,205 | | |
| Labour hold | | Swing | | |

Rainford
| Party | Candidate | Votes | % | ±% |
|---|---|---|---|---|
| Conservative | John Parr | 2,045 | 57.1 | −3.3 |
| Labour | David Wood | 1,233 | 34.4 | +3.2 |
| Liberal Democrats | Gary Pulfer | 302 | 8.4 | +0.0 |
| Majority | | 812 | 22.7 | −6.5 |
| Turnout | | 3,580 | | |
| Conservative hold | | Swing | | |

Rainhill
| Party | Candidate | Votes | % | ±% |
|---|---|---|---|---|
| Labour | Joseph DeAsha | 2,479 | 57.2 | −1.9 |
| Conservative | Jonathan Mackie | 803 | 18.5 | −6.0 |
| Independent | Neil Thompson | 581 | 13.4 | +13.4 |
| Liberal Democrats | Noreen Knowles | 469 | 10.8 | −5.5 |
| Majority | | 1,676 | 38.7 | +4.1 |
| Turnout | | 4,332 | | |
| Labour hold | | Swing | | |

Sutton and Bold
| Party | Candidate | Votes | % | ±% |
|---|---|---|---|---|
| Liberal Democrats | Stephanie Topping | 2,086 | 56.4 | −2.4 |
| Labour | Philip Wiseman | 1,380 | 37.3 | +0.9 |
| Conservative | Jill Jones | 231 | 6.2 | +1.5 |
| Majority | | 706 | 19.1 | −3.3 |
| Turnout | | 3,697 | | |
| Labour hold | | Swing | | |

Thatto Heath
| Party | Candidate | Votes | % | ±% |
|---|---|---|---|---|
| Labour | Sheila Seddon | 2,090 | 63.8 | −5.0 |
| Liberal Democrats | Carol Pearl | 812 | 24.8 | +4.2 |
| Conservative | Barbara Woodcock | 375 | 11.4 | +0.8 |
| Majority | | 1,278 | 39.0 | −9.2 |
| Turnout | | 3,277 | | |
| Labour hold | | Swing | | |

West Sutton
| Party | Candidate | Votes | % | ±% |
|---|---|---|---|---|
| Labour | John Wiseman | 1,580 | 62.4 | −2.1 |
| Liberal Democrats | Marise Roberts | 663 | 26.2 | +2.2 |
| Conservative | Ian Hunt | 290 | 11.4 | −0.1 |
| Majority | | 917 | 36.2 | −4.4 |
| Turnout | | 2,533 | 41 | +22 |
| Labour hold | | Swing | | |

Windle
| Party | Candidate | Votes | % | ±% |
|---|---|---|---|---|
| Conservative | Kenneth Roughley | 2,130 | 57.1 | +7.8 |
| Labour | Susan Murphy | 1,130 | 30.3 | −12.0 |
| Liberal Democrats | Katrina Young | 470 | 12.6 | +4.1 |
| Majority | | 1,000 | 26.8 | +19.8 |
| Turnout | | 3,730 | 55 | +20 |
| Conservative gain from Labour | | Swing | | |
