= 2002 St Helens Metropolitan Borough Council election =

2002 UK local government election

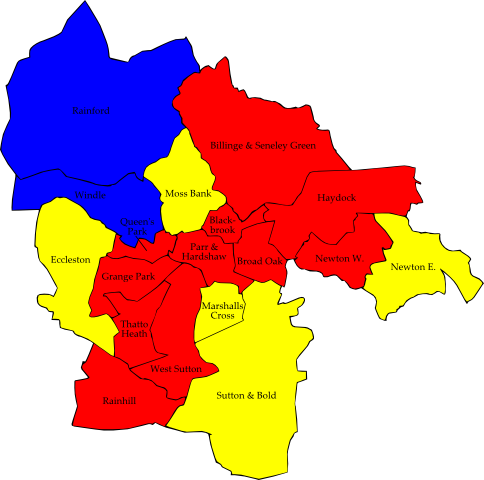
Map of the results of the 2002 St Helens Metropolitan Borough Council election. Labour in red, Liberal Democrats in yellow and Conservatives in blue.

The 2002 St Helens Metropolitan Borough Council election took place on 2 May 2002 to elect members of St Helens Metropolitan Borough Council in Merseyside, England. One third of the council was up for election and the Labour Party stayed in overall control of the council.

After the election, the composition of the council was:

- Labour 33
- Liberal Democrats 15
- Conservative 5
- Socialist Labour 1

== Background ==
Before the election Labour held a 16-seat majority on the council, with 18 seats being contested in 2002. Among the councillors who were defending seats at the election was the Liberal Democrat group leader Brian Spencer.

In an attempt to increase turnout, primary school children in the 2 wards with the lowest turnout in previous elections, Blackbrook and West Sutton were given balloons with the date of election printed on them to remind their parents of the election date. Access to polling places had also been improved and there was greater publicity about the availability of postal voting, which led to 5,086 requests for postal votes compared to 1,100 at the last election in 2000.

== Election result ==
Labour held control of the control with 33 councillors after losing 1 seat to the Conservatives. The Conservative gain came in Windle, where Nancy Ashcroft joined her husband as a councillor for the ward. This took the Conservatives to 5 seats on the council, while the Liberal Democrats remained on 15 seats. Overall turnout at the election was 26.4% and ranged between a low of 19.3% in West Sutton and a high of 36.93% in Rainford.

St Helens local election result 2002
Party	Seats	Gains	Losses	Net gain/loss	Seats %	Votes %	Votes	+/−
Labour	11	0	1	-1	61.1	47.6	17,126	+2.3%
Liberal Democrats	5	0	0	0	27.8	34.4	12,365	+1.4%
Conservative	2	1	0	+1	11.1	17.6	6,338	-3.7%
Socialist Labour	0	0	0	0	0	0.3	99	-0.2%
Independent	0	0	0	0	0	0.1	32	+0.1%

== Ward results ==
Billinge and Seneley Green
Party	Candidate	Votes	%	±%
Labour	Bessie Griffin	1,530	59.8	+6.4
Conservative	Elizabeth Black	589	23.0	−10.1
Liberal Democrats	Christine Langley	439	17.2	+3.7
Majority		941	36.8	+16.4
Turnout		2,558	24.9	+5.1
Labour hold		Swing		

Blackbrook
Party	Candidate	Votes	%	±%
Labour	Linda Maloney	928	63.4	−0.8
Liberal Democrats	Matthew Dunn	393	26.9	+4.8
Conservative	Judith Collins	142	9.7	−4.0
Majority		535	36.6	−5.5
Turnout		1,463	21.0	+6.6
Labour hold		Swing		

Broad Oak
Party	Candidate	Votes	%	±%
Labour	Ken Pinder	928	55.7	+4.0
Liberal Democrats	Alec Mills	654	39.2	−5.3
Conservative	Joan Foster	85	5.1	+1.3
Majority		274	16.4	+9.2
Turnout		1,667	25.2	+3.2
Labour hold		Swing		

Eccleston
Party	Candidate	Votes	%	±%
Liberal Democrats	Teresa Sims	2,064	71.3	+6.4
Labour	Stephen Glover	415	14.3	−0.7
Conservative	William Highcock	415	14.3	−5.8
Majority		1,649	57.0	+12.2
Turnout		2,894	34.0	+5.0
Liberal Democrats hold		Swing		

Grange Park
Party	Candidate	Votes	%	±%
Labour	Terence Hanley	851	51.9	+1.2
Liberal Democrats	David Evans	446	27.2	+4.8
Conservative	John Willis	245	14.9	−8.8
Socialist Labour	Michael Perry	99	6.0	+2.8
Majority		405	24.7	−2.3
Turnout		1,641	21.9	+5.9
Labour hold		Swing		

Haydock
Party	Candidate	Votes	%	±%
Labour	William Swift	1,387	63.2	−0.7
Liberal Democrats	Eric Sheldon	507	23.1	+2.9
Conservative	Keith Winstanley	299	13.6	−2.3
Majority		880	40.1	−3.6
Turnout		2,193	24.3	+6.2
Labour hold		Swing		

Marshalls Cross
Party	Candidate	Votes	%	±%
Liberal Democrats	John Beirne	1,047	69.6	+1.3
Labour	Michael Glover	418	27.8	−0.6
Conservative	Jill Jones	39	2.6	−0.7
Majority		629	41.8	+1.8
Turnout		1,504	25.3	+2.6
Liberal Democrats hold		Swing		

Moss Bank
Party	Candidate	Votes	%	±%
Liberal Democrats	Carole Kavanagh	1,495	56.4	+2.5
Labour	Barbara Jakubiak	1,005	37.9	−0.1
Conservative	John Cunliffe	152	5.7	−0.4
Majority		490	18.5	+2.7
Turnout		2,652	32.5	+3.5
Liberal Democrats hold		Swing		

Newton East
Party	Candidate	Votes	%	±%
Liberal Democrats	Neil Taylor	1,325	59.4	−6.1
Labour	Charles Banks	747	33.5	+5.7
Conservative	Margaret Harvey	160	7.2	+0.5
Majority		578	25.9	−11.8
Turnout		2,232	29.4	+1.7
Liberal Democrats hold		Swing		

Newton West
Party	Candidate	Votes	%	±%
Labour	Keith Deakin	1,202	61.8	+11.7
Liberal Democrats	David Crowther	512	26.3	−15.3
Conservative	Catherine Perks	232	11.9	+3.6
Majority		690	35.5	+27.0
Turnout		1,946	23.5	+1.8
Labour hold		Swing		

Parr and Hardshaw
Party	Candidate	Votes	%	±%
Labour	Mark Arnold	897	72.1	+1.4
Liberal Democrats	Noreen Knowles	238	19.1	+0.1
Conservative	Madeleine Wilcock	77	6.2	−4.0
Independent	David Round	32	2.6	+2.6
Majority		659	53.0	+1.3
Turnout		1,244	21.1	+4.7
Labour hold		Swing		

Queens Park
Party	Candidate	Votes	%	±%
Labour	Richard McCauley	897	54.8	+0.0
Liberal Democrats	Lesley Ronan	596	36.4	+4.4
Conservative	Charmain Pyke	143	8.7	−4.5
Majority		301	18.4	−4.4
Turnout		1,636	23.4	+5.2
Labour hold		Swing		

Rainford
Party	Candidate	Votes	%	±%
Conservative	Tony Brown	1,544	60.4	−8.5
Labour	David Wood	797	31.2	+5.4
Liberal Democrats	Stephen Topping	215	8.4	+3.0
Majority		747	29.2	−13.9
Turnout		2,556	36.9	+1.2
Conservative hold		Swing		

Rainhill
Party	Candidate	Votes	%	±%
Labour	Lee Myers	1,517	59.1	+0.5
Conservative	Jonathan Mackie	629	24.5	−5.3
Liberal Democrats	Kenneth Knowles	419	16.3	+4.8
Majority		888	34.6	+5.8
Turnout		2,565	26.7	+6.8
Labour hold		Swing		

Sutton and Bold
Party	Candidate	Votes	%	±%
Liberal Democrats	Brian Spencer	1,202	58.8	+5.7
Labour	Derek Maylor	744	36.4	−6.0
Conservative	Stephen Holt	97	4.7	+0.2
Majority		458	22.4	+11.7
Turnout		2,043	27.4	+1.4
Liberal Democrats hold		Swing		

Thatto Heath
Party	Candidate	Votes	%	±%
Labour	Patricia Robinson	1,061	68.8	+3.5
Liberal Democrats	Carol Pearl	318	20.6	+4.9
Conservative	Barbara Woodcock	164	10.6	−3.4
Majority		743	48.2	−1.4
Turnout		1,543	21.5	+2.7
Labour hold		Swing		

West Sutton
Party	Candidate	Votes	%	±%
Labour	Frank Robinson	784	64.5	
Liberal Democrats	Darren Makin	291	24.0	
Conservative	Henry Spriggs	140	11.5	
Majority		493	40.6	
Turnout		1,215	19.3	+3.9
Labour hold		Swing		

Windle
Party	Candidate	Votes	%	±%
Conservative	Nancy Ashcroft	1,186	49.3	
Labour	Geoffrey Almond	1,018	42.3	
Liberal Democrats	Gary Pulfer	204	8.5	
Majority		168	7.0	
Turnout		2,408	34.9	+6.0
Conservative gain from Labour		Swing		

== By-elections between 2002 and 2003 ==
Marshalls Cross by-election 19 September 2002
Party	Candidate	Votes	%	±%
Liberal Democrats		813	72.3	+2.7
Labour		275	24.5	−3.3
Conservative		36	3.2	+0.6
Majority		538	47.9	+6.1
Turnout		1,124	18.9	−6.4
Liberal Democrats hold		Swing		
