= 2012 St Helens Metropolitan Borough Council election =

2012 local election in England

Map of the results of the 2012 St Helens Metropolitan Borough Council election. Labour in red, Conservatives in blue and Liberal Democrats in yellow.

The 2012 St Helens Metropolitan Borough Council election took place on 3 May 2012 to elect members of St Helens Metropolitan Borough Council in Merseyside, England. One third of the council was up for election and the Labour Party stayed in overall control of the council.

At the end of the election, the composition of the council was:

- Labour 40
- Liberal Democrats 5
- Conservative 3

== Background ==
Before the start of the election, Labour ran the council with 35 seats, while the Liberal Democrats had 9 seats and the Conservatives had 4 seats. 16 seats were contested in 2012, with Labour defending 9, Liberal Democrats 5 and the Conservatives 2.

Five councillors stood down at the election, two Conservatives, Betty Lowe and the former leader of the Conservative group Wally Ashcroft, two Labour members Leon McGuire and Eric Smith, and one Liberal Democrat, John Beirne. Meanwhile, a former Liberal Democrat cabinet member, Carole Kavanagh, resigned her membership of the party over the policies of the national coalition government and defended her seat as an independent candidate.

While the Conservative, Labour and the Green parties contested every seat, the Liberal Democrats only put up candidates in 9 of the 16 wards.

== Election result ==
Labour gained 5 seats at the election to have 40 of the 48 councillors on St Helens council. The Liberal Democrats lost 4 seats to Labour to be reduced to 5 councillors, while the Conservatives lost 1 seat to have 3 councillors.

The Labour gains included defeating both the Liberal Democrat group leader and councillor for 27 years, Brian Spencer, in Sutton and the Liberal Democrat deputy leader Suzanne Knight in Newton. The Liberal Democrats held only one seat at the 2012 election in Eccleston, while the Conservatives held one seat in Rainford. Meanwhile, after contesting every seat at the election, the Greens failed to win any seats, but did come second in Blackbrook, Thatto Heath and West Park wards.

Brian Spencer, the former Liberal Democrat leader of St Helens council, was involved in an altercation with an Labour candidate, Mark Johnson, at the election count and would later in 2012 be convicted and fined for assault over the incident.

St Helens local election result 2012
| Party | Seats | Gains | Losses | Net gain/loss | Seats % | Votes % | Votes | +/− |
|---|---|---|---|---|---|---|---|---|
| Labour | 14 | 5 | 0 | +5 | 87.5 | 62.1 | 26,580 | +2.0 |
| Conservative | 1 | 0 | 1 | -1 | 6.3 | 12.9 | 5,532 | -4.2 |
| Liberal Democrats | 1 | 0 | 4 | -4 | 6.3 | 12.5 | 5,338 | -5.0 |
| Green | 0 | 0 | 0 | 0 | 0.0 | 8.0 | 3,421 | +6.0 |
| Independent | 0 | 0 | 0 | 0 | 0.0 | 3.5 | 1,506 | +1.8 |
| BNP | 0 | 0 | 0 | 0 | 0.0 | 0.9 | 391 | -0.1 |
| Socialist Equality | 0 | 0 | 0 | 0 | 0.0 | 0.2 | 68 | +0.2 |

== Ward results ==
Billinge and Seneley Green
| Party | Candidate | Votes | % | ±% |
|---|---|---|---|---|
| Labour | Alison Bacon | 1,802 | 63.3 | +10.4 |
| Conservative | Michael Hodgson | 536 | 18.8 | −8.1 |
| Independent | Peter Peers | 371 | 13.0 | −2.5 |
| Green | Susan Rahman | 140 | 4.9 | +4.9 |
| Majority | | 1,266 | 44.4 | +18.4 |
| Turnout | | 2,849 | 31.8 | −8.3 |
| Labour hold | | Swing | | |

Blackbrook
| Party | Candidate | Votes | % | ±% |
|---|---|---|---|---|
| Labour | Alan Cunliffe | 2,005 | 77.6 | +0.6 |
| Green | Ellen Finney | 321 | 12.4 | +12.4 |
| Conservative | Judith Collins | 258 | 10.0 | −1.4 |
| Majority | | 1,684 | 65.2 | −0.3 |
| Turnout | | 2,584 | 30.8 | −5.6 |
| Labour hold | | Swing | | |

Bold
| Party | Candidate | Votes | % | ±% |
|---|---|---|---|---|
| Labour | Thomas Hargreaves | 1,560 | 74.3 | +4.0 |
| Liberal Democrats | Marise Roberts | 220 | 10.5 | −4.5 |
| Green | David Hughes | 177 | 8.4 | +8.4 |
| Conservative | Barbara Woodcock | 144 | 6.9 | −1.4 |
| Majority | | 1,340 | 63.8 | +8.5 |
| Turnout | | 2,101 | 27.0 | −9.5 |
| Labour hold | | Swing | | |

Earlestown
| Party | Candidate | Votes | % | ±% |
|---|---|---|---|---|
| Labour | Charles Preston | 1,676 | 72.1 | +2.8 |
| Liberal Democrats | David Smith | 239 | 10.3 | −5.6 |
| Conservative | David Skeech | 218 | 9.4 | −5.4 |
| Green | Brian Banawich | 192 | 8.3 | +8.3 |
| Majority | | 1,437 | 61.8 | +8.3 |
| Turnout | | 2,325 | 28.2 | −4.7 |
| Labour hold | | Swing | | |

Eccleston
| Party | Candidate | Votes | % | ±% |
|---|---|---|---|---|
| Liberal Democrats | Teresa Sims | 1,961 | 52.0 | +15.2 |
| Labour | Mark Johnson | 1,122 | 29.8 | −3.7 |
| Conservative | Kathleen Barton | 365 | 9.7 | −11.9 |
| Green | Francis Williams | 323 | 8.6 | +0.6 |
| Majority | | 839 | 22.2 | +18.9 |
| Turnout | | 3,771 | 40.6 | −4.5 |
| Liberal Democrats hold | | Swing | | |

Haydock
| Party | Candidate | Votes | % | ±% |
|---|---|---|---|---|
| Labour | Anthony Burns | 2,132 | 78.6 | +16.6 |
| Conservative | Anthony Rigby | 310 | 11.4 | +4.6 |
| Green | Andrew Brownlow | 270 | 10.0 | +10.0 |
| Majority | | 1,822 | 67.2 | +28.8 |
| Turnout | | 2,712 | 30.0 | −5.6 |
| Labour hold | | Swing | | |

Moss Bank
| Party | Candidate | Votes | % | ±% |
|---|---|---|---|---|
| Labour | Paul Lynch | 1,628 | 53.9 | −0.1 |
| Independent | Carole Kavanagh | 1,135 | 37.6 | +28.4 |
| Green | Ian Donnelly | 144 | 4.8 | +4.8 |
| Conservative | Margaret Harvey | 115 | 3.8 | −1.1 |
| Majority | | 493 | 16.3 | −5.8 |
| Turnout | | 3,022 | 35.0 | −8.9 |
| Labour gain from Liberal Democrats | | Swing | | |

Newton
| Party | Candidate | Votes | % | ±% |
|---|---|---|---|---|
| Labour | Severiano Gomez-Aspron | 1,453 | 46.8 | +0.8 |
| Liberal Democrats | Suzanne Knight | 1,349 | 43.4 | +1.3 |
| Conservative | Brian Honey | 168 | 5.4 | −6.5 |
| Green | Ann Shacklady-Smith | 138 | 4.4 | +4.4 |
| Majority | | 104 | 3.3 | −0.6 |
| Turnout | | 3,108 | 36.1 | −0.5 |
| Labour gain from Liberal Democrats | | Swing | | |

Parr
| Party | Candidate | Votes | % | ±% |
|---|---|---|---|---|
| Labour | Andrew Bowden | 1,601 | 84.2 | +0.3 |
| Liberal Democrats | Paul Brown | 120 | 6.3 | −2.9 |
| Green | Carys Claffey | 104 | 5.5 | +5.5 |
| Conservative | Madeleine Wilcock | 76 | 4.0 | −3.0 |
| Majority | | 1,481 | 77.9 | +3.2 |
| Turnout | | 1,901 | 21.0 | −6.9 |
| Labour hold | | Swing | | |

Rainford
| Party | Candidate | Votes | % | ±% |
|---|---|---|---|---|
| Conservative | Rupert Nichols | 1,381 | 53.7 | −0.1 |
| Labour | Keith Aspinall | 980 | 38.1 | +2.6 |
| Green | William Fitzpatrick | 210 | 8.2 | +0.5 |
| Majority | | 401 | 15.6 | −2.6 |
| Turnout | | 2,571 | 38.5 | −11.4 |
| Conservative hold | | Swing | | |

Rainhill
| Party | Candidate | Votes | % | ±% |
|---|---|---|---|---|
| Labour | Barrie Grunewald | 2,088 | 67.1 | +2.4 |
| Conservative | Robert Reynolds | 685 | 22.0 | +0.5 |
| Green | Sandra Banawich | 341 | 11.0 | +11.0 |
| Majority | | 1,403 | 45.1 | +1.9 |
| Turnout | | 3,114 | 35.0 | −9.3 |
| Labour hold | | Swing | | |

Sutton
| Party | Candidate | Votes | % | ±% |
|---|---|---|---|---|
| Labour | Donald Jackson | 1,765 | 59.7 | −3.8 |
| Liberal Democrats | Brian Spencer | 901 | 30.5 | +5.8 |
| BNP | Peter Clayton | 124 | 4.2 | −1.2 |
| Green | David Parr | 106 | 3.6 | +3.6 |
| Conservative | Charmian Pyke | 61 | 2.1 | −4.3 |
| Majority | | 864 | 29.2 | −9.6 |
| Turnout | | 2,957 | 32.5 | −4.8 |
| Labour gain from Liberal Democrats | | Swing | | |

Thatto Heath
| Party | Candidate | Votes | % | ±% |
|---|---|---|---|---|
| Labour | Sheila Seddon | 1,857 | 74.8 | −3.3 |
| Green | Karen Atherton | 187 | 7.5 | +7.5 |
| Conservative | Henry Spriggs | 178 | 7.2 | −5.6 |
| BNP | Paul Telford | 136 | 5.5 | +5.5 |
| Liberal Democrats | Carol Pearl | 124 | 5.0 | −4.1 |
| Majority | | 1,670 | 67.3 | +2.0 |
| Turnout | | 2,482 | 25.7 | −7.0 |
| Labour hold | | Swing | | |

Town Centre
| Party | Candidate | Votes | % | ±% |
|---|---|---|---|---|
| Labour | Jo-Ann Willmitt | 1,502 | 70.3 | −2.7 |
| Liberal Democrats | Julie Ollerhead | 239 | 11.2 | −9.7 |
| BNP | Leila Bentham | 131 | 6.1 | +6.1 |
| Conservative | Richard Barton | 102 | 4.8 | −1.3 |
| Green | Winifred Brodie | 96 | 4.5 | +4.5 |
| Socialist Equality | Danny Dickinson | 68 | 3.2 | +3.2 |
| Majority | | 1,263 | 59.1 | +7.0 |
| Turnout | | 2,138 | 25.9 | −6.8 |
| Labour gain from Liberal Democrats | | Swing | | |

West Park
| Party | Candidate | Votes | % | ±% |
|---|---|---|---|---|
| Labour | Robert Ayres | 1,992 | 73.5 | +4.2 |
| Green | Alison Donnelly | 286 | 10.5 | +3.7 |
| Conservative | David Foster | 248 | 9.1 | −2.6 |
| Liberal Democrats | Mandy Stanley | 185 | 6.8 | −0.6 |
| Majority | | 1,706 | 62.9 | +5.3 |
| Turnout | | 2,711 | 30.6 | −6.5 |
| Labour hold | | Swing | | |

Windle
| Party | Candidate | Votes | % | ±% |
|---|---|---|---|---|
| Labour | Sophie Robinson | 1,417 | 56.9 | +6.1 |
| Conservative | John Cunliffe | 687 | 27.6 | −10.5 |
| Green | Andrew Donnelly | 386 | 15.5 | +8.0 |
| Majority | | 730 | 29.3 | +16.6 |
| Turnout | | 2,490 | 30.8 | −9.8 |
| Labour gain from Conservative | | Swing | | |

== By-elections between 2012 and 2014 ==
=== Windle ===
A by-election was held in Windle on 2 May 2013 after the death of Labour councillor Pat Martinez-Williams. The seat was held for Labour by David Baines with a majority of 717 votes over Conservative Robert Reynolds.

Windle by-election 2 May 2013
| Party | Candidate | Votes | % | ±% |
|---|---|---|---|---|
| Labour | David Baines | 1,329 | 58.1 | +1.2 |
| Conservative | Robert Reynolds | 612 | 26.8 | −0.8 |
| Green | Francis Williams | 345 | 15.1 | −0.4 |
| Majority | | 717 | 31.4 | +2.1 |
| Turnout | | 2,286 | 28.2 | −2.6 |
| Labour hold | | Swing | | |

=== Billinge and Seneley Green ===
A by-election was held in Billinge and Seneley Green on 28 November 2013 after the resignation of Labour councillor Alison Bacon. The seat was held for Labour by Dennis McDonnell with a majority of 494 votes over UK Independence Party candidate Laurence Allen.

Billinge and Seneley Green by-election 28 November 2013
| Party | Candidate | Votes | % | ±% |
|---|---|---|---|---|
| Labour | Dennis McDonnell | 936 | 50.7 | −12.6 |
| UKIP | Laurence Allen | 442 | 24.0 | +24.0 |
| Conservative | John Cunliffe | 248 | 13.4 | −5.4 |
| Green | Sue Rahman | 94 | 5.1 | +0.2 |
| BNP | Alan Brindle | 73 | 4.0 | +4.0 |
| Liberal Democrats | Noreen Knowles | 52 | 2.8 | +2.8 |
| Majority | | 494 | 26.8 | −17.6 |
| Turnout | | 1,845 | 19.8 | −12.0 |
| Labour hold | | Swing | | |
