= 2011 St Helens Metropolitan Borough Council election =

2011 local election in England

Map of the results of the 2011 St Helens Metropolitan Borough Council election. Labour in red, Liberal Democrats in yellow and Conservatives in blue.

The 2011 St Helens Metropolitan Borough Council election took place on 5 May 2011 to elect members of St Helens Metropolitan Borough Council in Merseyside, England. One third of the council was up for election and the Labour Party stayed in overall control of the council.

After the election, the composition of the council was:

- Labour 35
- Liberal Democrats 9
- Conservative 4

== Background ==
At the last election in 2010 Labour took control of the council with 28 seats after gaining 5 seats, while the Liberal Democrats dropped to 15 seats and the Conservatives were reduced to 5 seats. Labour were expected to make more gains in 2011, with the Liberal Democrats in particular expected to suffer from being in a coalition government with the Conservatives nationally.

Both Labour and the Liberal Democrats were defending 7 seats in 2011, while the Conservatives defended 2 seats. Other candidates at the election included 4 from the Green Party, who had not put candidates up in previous elections.

== Election result ==
Labour increased its majority on the council after gaining 7 seats, including 6 from the Liberal Democrats. This took Labour to 35 councillors, while reducing the Liberal Democrats to 9 seats on the council, with the only Liberal Democrat to be elected being Michael Haw in Eccleston. Meanwhile, the wife of the Conservative group leader, Nancy Ashcroft, lost her seat on the council in Windle to Labour, reducing the Conservatives to 4 seats on the council.

St Helens local election result 2011
Party	Seats	Gains	Losses	Net gain/loss	Seats %	Votes %	Votes	+/−
Labour	14	7	0	+7	87.5	60.1	31,165	+11.9%
Liberal Democrats	1	0	6	-6	6.3	17.5	9,085	-12.9%
Conservative	1	0	1	-1	6.3	17.1	8,836	-1.2%
Green	0	0	0	0	0	2.0	1,061	+2.0%
Independent	0	0	0	0	0	1.7	901	+1.5%
BNP	0	0	0	0	0	1.0	524	-1.9%
UKIP	0	0	0	0	0	0.5	247	+0.5%

== Ward results ==
Billinge and Seneley Green
Party	Candidate	Votes	%	±%
Labour	Joseph Pearson	1,896	52.9	+3.3
Conservative	Michael Hodgson	964	26.9	−3.1
Independent	Peter Peers	556	15.5	+15.5
Liberal Democrats	Stephen Knowles	170	4.7	−15.7
Majority		932	26.0	+6.4
Turnout		3,586	40.1	−27.0
Labour hold		Swing		

Blackbrook
Party	Candidate	Votes	%	±%
Labour	Linda Maloney	2,354	77.0	+19.3
Liberal Democrats	Brian Bonney	353	11.5	−14.1
Conservative	Judith Collins	350	11.4	+0.4
Majority		2,001	65.5	+23.4
Turnout		3,057	36.4	−22.8
Labour hold		Swing		

Bold
Party	Candidate	Votes	%	±%
Labour	Anthony Johnson	1,939	70.3	+22.0
Liberal Democrats	Marise Roberts	413	15.0	−20.0
Conservative	Charmian Pyke	228	8.3	−1.6
BNP	James Winstanley	179	6.5	−0.3
Majority		1,526	55.3	+42.0
Turnout		2,759	36.5	−20.9
Labour gain from Liberal Democrats		Swing		

Earlestown
Party	Candidate	Votes	%	±%
Labour	Keith Deakin	1,845	69.3	+11.8
Liberal Democrats	David Smith	422	15.9	−10.1
Conservative	David Skeech	394	14.8	−1.7
Majority		1,423	53.5	+22.0
Turnout		2,661	32.9	−21.4
Labour hold		Swing		

Eccleston
Party	Candidate	Votes	%	±%
Liberal Democrats	Michael Haw	1,540	36.8	−8.5
Labour	Sophie Robinson	1,401	33.5	+3.7
Conservative	Kathleen Barton	904	21.6	−0.1
Green	Francis Williams	336	8.0	+8.0
Majority		139	3.3	−12.2
Turnout		4,181	45.1	−24.9
Liberal Democrats hold		Swing		

Haydock
Party	Candidate	Votes	%	±%
Labour	Jeanette Banks	2,010	62.0	+10.5
Liberal Democrats	Janet Sheldon	765	23.6	−13.4
UKIP	Gary Robinson	247	7.6	+7.6
Conservative	Robert Reynolds	221	6.8	−4.7
Majority		1,245	38.4	+23.9
Turnout		3,243	35.6	−24.5
Labour gain from Liberal Democrats		Swing		

Moss Bank
Party	Candidate	Votes	%	±%
Labour	John Fulham	2,031	54.0	+7.7
Liberal Democrats	David Kent	1,199	31.9	−8.6
Independent	David Lawrenson	345	9.2	+9.2
Conservative	Anthony Rigby	183	4.9	−8.3
Majority		832	22.1	+16.2
Turnout		3,758	43.9	−17.0
Labour gain from Liberal Democrats		Swing		

Newton
Party	Candidate	Votes	%	±%
Labour	Sandra Dyer	1,432	46.0	+10.7
Liberal Democrats	Peter Astbury	1,311	42.1	−6.2
Conservative	Brian Honey	369	11.9	−4.5
Majority		121	3.9	
Turnout		3,112	36.6	−23.1
Labour gain from Liberal Democrats		Swing		

Parr
Party	Candidate	Votes	%	±%
Labour	Keith Roberts	2,026	83.9	+12.4
Liberal Democrats	Paul Brown	221	9.2	−9.9
Conservative	Madeleine Wilcock	168	7.0	−2.4
Majority		1,805	74.7	+22.2
Turnout		2,415	27.9	−17.3
Labour hold		Swing		

Rainford
Party	Candidate	Votes	%	±%
Conservative	James Jones	1,792	53.8	+4.5
Labour	Keith Aspinall	1,184	35.5	+1.3
Green	Carla Hay	255	7.7	+7.7
Liberal Democrats	Frederick Barrett	102	3.1	−13.5
Majority		608	18.2	+3.1
Turnout		3,333	49.9	−21.5
Conservative hold		Swing		

Rainhill
Party	Candidate	Votes	%	±%
Labour	Joseph De Asha	2,569	64.7	+18.4
Conservative	John Cunliffe	853	21.5	+2.2
Liberal Democrats	Denise Aspinall	549	13.8	−16.1
Majority		1,716	43.2	+26.8
Turnout		3,971	44.3	−22.0
Labour hold		Swing		

Sutton
Party	Candidate	Votes	%	±%
Labour	Janet Johnson	2,151	63.5	+23.4
Liberal Democrats	Kenneth Knowles	836	24.7	−20.2
Conservative	Barbara Woodcock	218	6.4	−2.2
BNP	Peter Clayton	184	5.4	−1.0
Majority		1,315	38.8	
Turnout		3,389	37.3	−19.7
Labour gain from Liberal Democrats		Swing		

Thatto Heath
Party	Candidate	Votes	%	±%
Labour	Patricia Ireland	2,409	78.1	+19.4
Conservative	Henry Spriggs	395	12.8	−0.6
Liberal Democrats	Carol Pearl	282	9.1	−11.9
Majority		2,014	65.3	+27.6
Turnout		3,086	32.7	−22.0
Labour hold		Swing		

Town Centre
Party	Candidate	Votes	%	±%
Labour	Geoffrey Almond	1,962	73.0	+19.0
Liberal Democrats	Lynn Turton	562	20.9	−8.0
Conservative	Richard Barton	163	6.1	−2.6
Majority		1,400	52.1	+27.0
Turnout		2,687	32.7	−16.2
Labour gain from Liberal Democrats		Swing		

West Park
Party	Candidate	Votes	%	±%
Labour	Marlene Quinn	2,293	69.3	+10.6
Conservative	David Foster	386	11.7	−0.5
Liberal Democrats	Ruth Watmough	245	7.4	−13.1
Green	William Fitzpatrick	224	6.8	+6.8
BNP	Leila Bentham	161	4.9	−0.6
Majority		1,907	57.6	+19.4
Turnout		3,309	37.1	−21.1
Labour hold		Swing		

Windle
Party	Candidate	Votes	%	±%
Labour	Patricia Martinez-Williams	1,663	50.8	+6.8
Conservative	Nancy Ashcroft	1,248	38.1	+2.3
Green	Andrew Donnelly	246	7.5	+7.5
Liberal Democrats	Noreen Knowles	115	3.5	−16.7
Majority		415	12.7	+4.5
Turnout		3,272	40.6	−21.5
Labour gain from Conservative		Swing		
