= 1999 St Helens Metropolitan Borough Council election =

1999 UK local government election

The 1999 St Helens Metropolitan Borough Council election took place on 6 May 1999 to elect members of St Helens Metropolitan Borough Council in Merseyside, England. One third of the council was up for election and the Labour Party stayed in overall control of the council.

After the election, the composition of the council was:

- Labour 37
- Liberal Democrats 14
- Conservative 3

== Background ==
After the last election in 1998 Labour had 42 seats, the Liberal Democrats had 10 and there were 2 Conservatives. However, in January 1999 the Liberal Democrats gained a seat in Newton West from Labour in a by-election.

== Election result ==
The Liberal Democrats gained 3 seats from Labour in Sutton and Bold, Moss Bank and Newton East wards to have 14 councillors. Meanwhile, the Conservatives also gained a seat from Labour in Rainford, to mean that Labour dropped 4 seats in total. Turnout at the election ranged from a high of 33.2% in Rainford to a low of 13.5% in Blackbrook.

Following the election Labour councillor Marie Rimmer became leader of the council again succeeding Mike Doyle, having previously stepped down as leader in 1993.

St Helens local election result 1999
Party	Seats	Gains	Losses	Net gain/loss	Seats %	Votes %	Votes	+/−
Labour	12			-4	66.7			
Liberal Democrats	5			+3	27.8			
Conservative	1			+1	5.6			
