= 2026 St Helens Borough Council election =

2026 English local government election

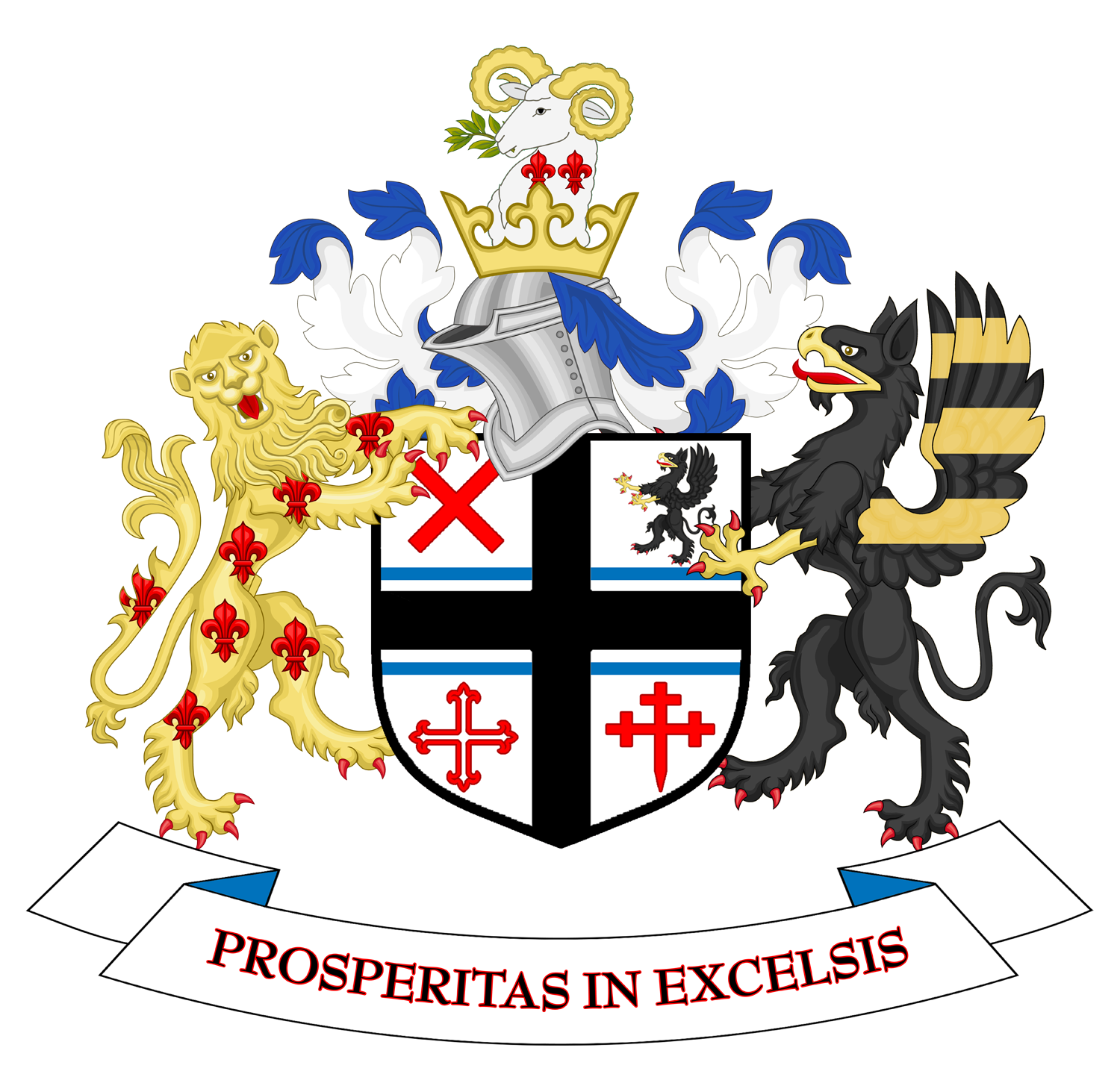
- 7 May 2026

All 48 seats to St Helens Borough Council 25 seats needed for a majority
- Turnout: 51,751; 38.5%
	First party	Second party	Third party
Leader	Victor Floyd (Note: Leader prior to election)	James Tasker (Note: James Tasker was leader of The Independents group.) (Note: Current leadership unclear)	Geoff Pearl
Party	Reform	Independent	Liberal Democrats
Last election	Did not stand	7 seats, 15.9%	4 seats, 7.0%
Seats before	3	7 (Note: Of the 7 Independents councillors before the election, 3 sat in The Independents group, 2 sat in the Newton-le-Willows Independents group, and 2 were non-aligned.)	3
Seats won	35	6	3
Seat change	▲32	▼1	Steady
Popular vote	54,047	14,570	7,223
Percentage	39.8%	10.7%	5.3%
Swing	N/A	▼4.8%	▼4.6%
	Fourth party	Fifth party	Sixth party
Leader	Anthony Burns (defeated)	Linda Mussell	David van der Burg (retiring)
Party	Labour	Conservative	Green
Last election	29 seats, 54.2%	2 seats, 10.6%	6 seats, 12.2%
Seats before	28	2	5 (Note: Includes the vacant seat in Bold & Lee Green last held by a Green.)
Seats won	3	1	0
Seat change	▼25	▼1	▼5
Popular vote	38,282	5,406	16,308
Percentage	28.2%	4.0%	12.0%
Swing	▼24.7%	▼6.7%	▲1.2%
- Winner of each seat at the 2026 St Helens Borough Council election. As of May 2026, Town Centre Ward election to be rearranged following death of candidate.
Leader before election
Anthony Burns
Labour
Leader after election
George Woodward
Reform

The 2026 St Helens Borough Council election was held on 7 May 2026, alongside the other local elections across the United Kingdom being held on the same day. All 48 members of St Helens Borough Council were elected. The election in the Town Centre ward was postponed until 25 June following the death of one of the original candidates.

Prior to the election, the council was under Labour majority control. At this election, Reform UK won 35 of the 48 seats on the council, giving them a majority. Labour was left with only three seats, and the incumbent Labour leader of the council, Anthony Burns, was one of those who lost his seat. After the election, Reform chose George Woodward to be its new group leader. He was formally appointed as leader of the council at the subsequent annual council meeting on 20 May 2026.

== Summary ==
=== Background ===
In 2022, Labour retained control of the council.

=== Election result ===
2026 St Helens Metropolitan Borough Council election
Party	Candidates	Seats	Gains	Losses	Net gain/loss	Seats %	Votes %	Votes	+/−
Reform	48	35	33	0	▲33	72.9	39.8	54,047	N/A
Labour	47	3	0	26	▼26	6.3	28.2	38,282	–24.7
Liberal Democrats	6	3	0	0	Steady	6.3	5.3	7,223	–4.6
Rainhill Independents	3	3	3	0	▲3	6.3	4.8	6,580	–24.7
Newton-le-Willow Independents	4	3	3	0	▲3	6.3	3.9	5,251	–24.7
Conservative	19	1	0	1	▼1	2.1	4.0	5,406	–6.7
Green	27	0	0	6	▼6	0.0	12.0	16,308	+1.2
Independent	8	0	0	7	▼7	0.0	2.0	2,739	–13.5

== Ward results ==
=== Billinge & Seneley Green ===
Billinge & Seneley Green (3 seats)
Party	Candidate	Votes	%	±%
Reform	Jennifer Gerrard	1,465	44.4	N/A
Reform	John Porter	1,421	43.1	N/A
Reform	Matthew Kent	1,370	41.5	N/A
Labour	Steve Owen	958	29.0	–15.6
Independent	Peter Peers*	947	28.7	–17.1
Independent	Colin Betts*	816	24.7	–18.8
Labour	Rod Bell	777	23.6	–15.6
Labour	Phil Gwilliam	727	22.0	–9.5
Green	Sarah Jennings	552	16.7	N/A
Green	Stephen Gaskell	546	16.5	N/A
Conservative	Denise Gibney	319	9.7	–11.1
Turnout		~3,299		
Reform gain from Independent				
Reform gain from Independent				
Reform gain from Labour				

=== Blackbrook ===
Blackbrook (3 seats)
Party	Candidate	Votes	%	±%
Reform	Nigel Brown	1,364	49.3	N/A
Reform	Eileen Fleming	1,345	48.6	N/A
Reform	Victor Floyd*	1,281	46.3	N/A
Labour	Anthony Burns*	965	34.9	–24.1
Labour	Paul McQuade*	886	32.0	–24.9
Labour	Gareth Cross	792	28.6	–28.0
Green	Lorraine Clarke	590	21.3	–10.9
Green	Jack Davies	454	16.4	–15.5
Green	Daniel Thomas	442	16.0	N/A
Conservative	David Titmuss	176	6.4	–13.5
Turnout		~2,765		
Reform gain from Labour				
Reform gain from Labour				
Reform hold				

=== Bold & Lea Green ===
Bold & Lee Green (3 seats)
Party	Candidate	Votes	%	±%
Reform	David Hawley*	1,456	48.5	N/A
Reform	Mark Hitchen	1,434	47.8	N/A
Reform	Samson Egbike	1,340	44.6	N/A
Green	Sam Harding	744	24.8	–23.2
Green	Fae Oakley	728	24.2	–22.5
Labour	Angela McCauley	700	23.3	–19.8
Green	Graeme Knapper	695	23.1	–21.4
Labour	Alan Langley	677	22.5	–18.5
Labour	Paul Pritchard	610	20.3	–18.7
Liberal Democrats	John Lee	346	11.5	N/A
Conservative	Barbara Woodcock	278	9.3	–3.8
Turnout		~3,003		
Reform hold				
Reform gain from Green				
Reform gain from Green				

=== Eccleston ===
Eccleston (3 seats)
Party	Candidate	Votes	%	±%
Liberal Democrats	Michael Haw*	2,224	63.6	–10.5
Liberal Democrats	Philip Cass	1,809	51.8	–19.8
Liberal Democrats	Geoff Pearl*	1,756	50.3	–13.4
Reform	David Lawrenson	979	28.0	N/A
Reform	Billy Jones	943	27.0	N/A
Reform	Steve Townsend	897	25.7	N/A
Labour	Joy Akinkuade	566	16.2	–7.9
Green	Sally Dodgson	536	15.3	N/A
Labour	Joe Quinn	511	14.6	N/A
Conservative	Elizabeth Appleton	262	7.5	–5.4
Turnout		~3,494		
Liberal Democrats hold				
Liberal Democrats hold				
Liberal Democrats hold				

=== Haydock ===
Haydock (3 seats)
Party	Candidate	Votes	%	±%
Reform	Stephen Mousdell	1,331	46.2	N/A
Reform	Michael Chesworth	1,282	44.5	N/A
Reform	Stephen Claybrook	1,240	43.0	N/A
Green	Paul Hooton*	938	32.5	–26.6
Green	Emma van der Burg*	771	26.8	–30.7
Green	Oliver Eddleston	692	24.0	–30.0
Labour	Caleb Burns	607	21.1	–12.1
Labour	Rachel Harrison	577	20.0	–10.3
Labour	Owen Farnworth	561	19.5	–10.6
Independent	Andrea Blake	237	8.2	N/A
Independent	Ian Sutton	229	7.9	N/A
Conservative	Melanie Lee	181	6.3	–5.1
Turnout		~2,882		
Reform gain from Green				
Reform gain from Green				
Reform gain from Green				

=== Moss Bank ===
Moss Bank (3 seats)
Party	Candidate	Votes	%	±%
Reform	Gary Edgerton	1,664	54.2	N/A
Reform	David Kent	1,638	53.3	N/A
Reform	Jack Styles	1,613	52.5	N/A
Labour	Jeanette Banks*	1,172	38.2	–25.2
Labour	Tracy Dickinson*	1,126	36.7	–26.7
Labour	Shana Begum	1,116	36.3	–27.1
Green	Allan Kayll	605	19.7	N/A
Conservative	Lisa Cunliffe	280	9.1	–12.0
Turnout		~3,071		
Reform gain from Labour				
Reform gain from Labour				
Reform gain from Labour				

=== Newton-le-Willows East ===
Newton-le-Willows East (3 seats)
Party	Candidate	Votes	%	±%
Labour	Keith Laird*	1,293	39.2	–24.2
Reform	George Woodward	1,248	37.9	N/A
Labour	Ian Mills	1,183	35.9	–24.6
Reform	John Murphy	1,083	32.9	N/A
Newton-le-Willow Independents	Tom Middleton-Leonard	1,055	32.0	N/A
Reform	John Owen	1,019	30.9	N/A
Green	Chris Kennedy	1,000	30.3	N/A
Labour	Lisa Preston	993	30.1	–26.3
Liberal Democrats	David Smith	698	21.2	+0.9
Conservative	John Cunliffe	318	9.6	–11.5
Turnout		~3,297		
Labour hold				
Reform gain from Labour				
Labour hold				

=== Newton-le-Willows West ===
Newton-le-Willows West (3 seats)
Party	Candidate	Votes	%	±%
Newton-le-Willow Independents	Terry Maguire*	1,622	53.6	–5.5
Newton-le-Willow Independents	Karl Collier*	1,426	47.1	+1.1
Newton-le-Willow Independents	Craig Smith	1,148	37.9	–2.9
Labour	Dave Banks*	920	30.4	–11.7
Labour	Peter Blood	900	29.7	–12.1
Labour	Scott Smulders	809	26.7	–10.9
Reform	Mark Bell	785	25.9	N/A
Reform	Robert Hart	699	23.1	N/A
Reform	Gillian Pierre-Louise Moore	673	22.2	N/A
Conservative	Allan Dockerty	94	3.1	–5.3
Turnout		~3,025		
Newton-le-Willow Independents hold				
Newton-le-Willow Independents hold				
Newton-le-Willow Independents gain from Labour				

=== Parr ===
Parr (3 seats)
Party	Candidate	Votes	%	±%
Reform	Dan Axworthy	1,173	55.8	N/A
Reform	Janet Rowlands	1,161	55.2	N/A
Reform	Mal Webster	1,104	52.5	N/A
Labour	Cath Brooks	713	33.9	–45.2
Labour	Andy Bowden*	708	33.7	–39.2
Labour	Bisi Osundeko*	593	28.2	–36.9
Green	Lizzie O'Dell	364	17.3	N/A
Independent	Teri George	204	9.7	N/A
Independent	Jeff Williams	187	8.9	N/A
Conservative	Mackenzie France	104	4.9	–17.0
Turnout		~2,104		
Reform gain from Labour				
Reform gain from Labour				
Reform gain from Labour				

=== Peasley Cross & Fingerpost ===
Peasley Cross & Fingerpost
Party	Candidate	Votes	%	±%
Reform	Sharon Roughley	392	48.5	N/A
Labour	Damien O'Connor*	217	26.9	–33.1
Green	Em Patterson	122	15.1	–4.3
Independent	Andrew Low	48	5.9	N/A
Conservative	Iris Brown	29	3.6	–16.4
Majority		175	21.6	N/A
Turnout		809		
Reform gain from Labour				

=== Rainford ===
Rainford (2 seats)
Party	Candidate	Votes	%	±%
Reform	Philip Corden	1,058	33.4	N/A
Conservative	Linda Mussell*	1,025	32.3	–24.9
Conservative	Charlotte Case	933	29.4	–27.3
Reform	Anthony Devanny	898	28.3	N/A
Green	Amber Johnson	758	23.9	N/A
Green	Sean Davies	739	23.3	N/A
Labour	Richard Jacques	495	15.6	–27.4
Labour	Malcolm Simm	437	13.8	N/A
Turnout		~3,172		
Reform gain from Conservative				
Conservative hold				

=== Rainhill ===
Rainhill (3 seats)
Party	Candidate	Votes	%	±%
Rainhill Independents	James Tasker*	2,372	64.4	–0.3
Rainhill Independents	Donna Greaves*	2,113	57.4	–1.6
Rainhill Independents	James Dunn	2,095	56.9	–0.2
Reform	Neil Conway	806	21.9	N/A
Reform	Jo Woodhouse	788	21.4	N/A
Reform	Mark Gilgannon	778	21.1	N/A
Labour	Elaine Hodkinson	765	20.8	–11.8
Labour	Tabinda Iftikhar	612	16.6	–14.5
Labour	Masooma Zaki	569	15.5	–13.0
Conservative	Henry Spriggs	149	4.0	–5.2
Turnout		~3,682		
Rainhill Independents hold				
Rainhill Independents hold				
Rainhill Independents hold				

=== St Helens Town Centre ===
The vote for St Helens Town Centre was postponed until 25 June 2026, following the death of Andrew John Feeney, one of the Reform UK candidates.

St Helens Town Centre (2)
Party	Candidate	Votes	%	±%
Reform	Jeremy Peter Axworthy	460		
Labour	Michael Angelo Fisher	436		
Reform	Chris Page	419		
Labour	Michelle Elaine Sweeney	391		
Green	Chloe Graves	146		
Green	James Mellors	112		
Independent	Thomas Hughes	71		
Conservative	Christine Huskie	41		
Turnout			20.3	
Reform gain from Labour				
Labour hold				

=== Sutton North West ===
Sutton North West (2 seats)
Party	Candidate	Votes	%	±%
Reform	Anthony Johnson	909	51.5	N/A
Reform	Mark Johnson	909	51.5	N/A
Labour	Niall Campbell*	757	42.9	–11.3
Labour	John Hodkinson*	733	41.6	–12.4
Conservative	Anne Spanner	219	12.4	–14.5
Turnout		~1,764		
Reform gain from Labour				
Reform gain from Labour				

=== Sutton South East ===
Sutton South East (2 seats)
Party	Candidate	Votes	%	±%
Reform	John Pinnington*	895	52.8	N/A
Reform	Brendan Moss	854	50.4	N/A
Labour	Charlie Preston	755	44.5	+2.1
Labour	John Riley	734	43.3	+3.0
Conservative	Dawn Smith	152	9.0	–9.0
Turnout		~1,695		
Reform hold				
Reform gain from Labour				

=== Thatto Heath ===
Thatto Heath (3 seats)
Party	Candidate	Votes	%	±%
Reform	Emma Beck	1,364	47.9	N/A
Reform	Jack Benyon	1,329	46.7	N/A
Reform	James Long	1,252	44.0	N/A
Labour	Nova Charlton*	1,185	41.6	–22.0
Labour	Robyn Hattersley*	1,105	38.8	–22.9
Labour	Richard McCauley*	998	35.0	–26.1
Green	Sue Bishop	651	22.9	–5.4
Liberal Democrats	Alexandru-Emilian Adamovici	390	13.7	N/A
Conservative	Elizabeth Black	271	9.5	–14.1
Turnout		~2,848		
Reform gain from Labour				
Reform gain from Labour				
Reform gain from Labour				

=== West Park ===
West Park (3 seats)
Party	Candidate	Votes	%	±%
Reform	Stephen Little	1,391	43.5	N/A
Reform	Michael Gibson	1,381	43.2	N/A
Reform	Mark King	1,370	42.9	N/A
Labour	Patrick Alcantara	1,188	37.2	–35.2
Labour	Julie Hand	1,123	35.1	–36.1
Labour	Matthew Butterworth	1,102	35.4	–28.8
Green	Tom Armstrong	630	19.7	N/A
Green	Sarah Whelan	598	18.7	N/A
Green	Anthony Aster	559	17.5	N/A
Conservative	Richard Barton	249	7.8	–16.8
Turnout		~3,197		
Reform gain from Labour				
Reform gain from Labour				
Reform gain from Labour				

=== Windle ===
Windle (3 seats)
Party	Candidate	Votes	%	±%
Reform	Clayton Ede	1,287	39.9	N/A
Reform	Anthony Keogh	1,262	39.1	N/A
Reform	Alex Twist	1,237	38.3	N/A
Labour	Lynn Clarke*	1,205	37.3	–22.1
Labour	George McCulley	1,042	32.3	–19.9
Labour	Robbie Young	993	30.7	–16.9
Green	Andrew Donnelly	880	27.3	–12.2
Green	Terence Price	731	22.6	N/A
Green	Sue Rahman	725	22.5	N/A
Conservative	Leighton Frawley	326	10.1	–19.8
Turnout		~3,229		
Reform gain from Labour				
Reform gain from Labour				
Reform gain from Labour				

== By-elections ==
=== Haydock ===
A by-election was held in Haydock on 25 June 2026 after the resignation of Reform councillor Stephen Mousdell.

Haydock by-election 25 June 2026
Party	Candidate	Votes	%	±%
Reform	Tony Devanny	717	33.0	−7.4
Independent	Paul Robert Hooton	631	29.0	N/A
Labour	Owen Farnworth	598	27.5	+9.1
Green	Amber Carole Johnson	154	7.1	−21.4
Conservative	Melanie Ann Marie Lee	39	1.8	−3.7
Independent	Andrea Marie Blake	36	1.7	−5.5
Turnout			25.9	
Reform hold				

=== Billinge & Seneley Green ===
Billinge & Seneley Green by-election, 27th August 2026
Party	Candidate	Votes	%	±%
Labour	Steve Owen	1,158	41.3	+18.7
Reform	Karen Hatch	892	31.8	−2.7
Independent	Colin Betts	496	17.7	−1.5
Green	Sue Rahman	106	3.8	−9.2
Conservative	David Titmuss	94	3.3	−4.2
Independent	Tom Middleton-Leonard	60	2.1	N/A
Majority		266	9.5	N/A
Turnout		2806	33.9	−6.0
Labour gain from Reform		Swing		
