= 2000 St Helens Metropolitan Borough Council election =

2000 UK local government election

The 2000 St Helens Metropolitan Borough Council election took place on 4 May 2000 to elect members of St Helens Metropolitan Borough Council in Merseyside, England. One third of the council was up for election and the Labour party stayed in overall control of the council.

After the election, the composition of the council was

- Labour 35
- Liberal Democrats 15
- Conservative 4

== Election result ==
Labour remained in control of the council with 35 seats, but suffered a net loss of 2 seats. The Liberal Democrats increased their share of the vote and gained Moss Bank and Sutton and Bold from Labour, but lost Newton West back to Labour, to leave the party on 15 seats. Meanwhile, the Conservatives also gained a seat from Labour in Windle, defeating the mayor Pat Jackson, while the leader of the Conservative group Betty Lowe held her seat in Rainford to leave the Conservatives with 4 councillors.

Turnout in 4 wards was at or below 16%, while the highest turnout was in Rainford at 35.7%. The turnout in St Helens was an increase from the last election, which was put down to a trial of early voting on the Friday and Saturday before the election in 6 wards.

St Helens local election result 2000
Party	Seats	Gains	Losses	Net gain/loss	Seats %	Votes %	Votes	+/−
Labour	13	1	3	-2	65.0	45.3	14,953	
Liberal Democrats	5	2	1	+1	25.0	33.0	10,891	
Conservative	2	1	0	+1	10.0	21.3	7,040	
Socialist Labour	0	0	0	0	0	0.5	152	

== Ward results ==
Billinge and Seneley Green
Party	Candidate	Votes	%	±%
Labour	Neville Bullock	1,086	53.4	
Conservative	Elizabeth Black	672	33.1	
Liberal Democrats	Stephen Broughton	275	13.5	
Majority		414	20.4	
Turnout		2,033	19.8	
Labour hold		Swing		

Blackbrook
Party	Candidate	Votes	%	±%
Labour	Andy Bowden	662	64.2	
Liberal Democrats	John Brown	228	22.1	
Conservative	James Spanner	141	13.7	
Majority		434	42.1	
Turnout		1,031	14.4	
Labour hold		Swing		

Broad Oak
Party	Candidate	Votes	%	±%
Labour	Keith Roberts	764	51.7	
Liberal Democrats	Gail Mills	658	44.5	
Conservative	Anne Spanner	56	3.8	
Majority		106	7.2	
Turnout		1,478	22.0	
Labour hold		Swing		

Eccleston
Party	Candidate	Votes	%	±%
Liberal Democrats	Geoffrey Pearl	1,604	64.9	
Conservative	Thomas Brooke	496	20.1	
Labour	Stephen Glover	371	15.0	
Majority		1,108	44.8	
Turnout		2,471	29.0	
Liberal Democrats hold		Swing		

Grange Park
Party	Candidate	Votes	%	±%
Labour	Marlene Quinn	610	50.7	
Conservative	Catherine Lindon	285	23.7	
Liberal Democrats	David Evans	270	22.4	
Socialist Labour	Ronale Waugh	38	3.2	
Majority		325	27.0	
Turnout		1,203	16.0	
Labour hold		Swing		

Haydock
Party	Candidate	Votes	%	±%
Labour	Jim Caunce	1,046	63.9	
Liberal Democrats	Carole Worthington	331	20.2	
Conservative	Margaret Harvey	261	15.9	
Majority		715	43.7	
Turnout		1,638	18.1	
Labour hold		Swing		

Marshalls Cross
Party	Candidate	Votes	%	±%
Liberal Democrats	Valerie Beirne	932	68.3	
Labour	Michael Glover	387	28.4	
Conservative	Jill Jones	45	3.3	
Majority		545	40.0	
Turnout		1,364	22.7	
Liberal Democrats hold		Swing		

Moss Bank
Party	Candidate	Votes	%	±%
Liberal Democrats	Eric Simpson	1,292	53.9	
Labour	Barbara Jakubiak	912	38.0	
Conservative	Judith Collins	147	6.1	
Socialist Labour	Kenneth Tilston	48	2.0	
Majority		380	15.8	
Turnout		2,399	29.0	
Liberal Democrats gain from Labour		Swing		

Newton East
Party	Candidate	Votes	%	±%
Liberal Democrats	Suzanne Knight	1,394	65.5	
Labour	Thomas Chisnall	591	27.8	
Conservative	Keith Winstanley	143	6.7	
Majority		803	37.7	
Turnout		2,128	27.7	
Liberal Democrats hold		Swing		

Newton West
Party	Candidate	Votes	%	±%
Labour	Sandra Banawich	876	50.1	
Liberal Democrats	Virginia Taylor	727	41.6	
Conservative	Brian Honey	145	8.3	
Majority		149	8.5	
Turnout		1,748	21.7	
Labour gain from Liberal Democrats		Swing		

Parr and Hardshaw
Party	Candidate	Votes	%	±%
Labour	John Fletcher	706	70.7	
Liberal Democrats	Noreen Knowles	190	19.0	
Conservative	Margaret Bolton	102	10.2	
Majority		516	51.7	
Turnout		998	16.4	
Labour hold		Swing		

Queens Park
Party	Candidate	Votes	%	±%
Labour	Marlene Newman	710	54.8	
Liberal Democrats	Lesley Ronan	415	32.0	
Conservative	Herbert Williams	171	13.2	
Majority		295	22.8	
Turnout		1,296	18.2	
Labour hold		Swing		

Rainford
Party	Candidate	Votes	%	±%
Conservative	Betty Lowe	1,725	68.9	
Labour	David Wood	645	25.8	
Liberal Democrats	Frederick Barrett	134	5.4	
Majority		1,080	43.1	
Turnout		2,504	35.7	
Conservative hold		Swing		

Rainhill
Party	Candidate	Votes	%	±%
Labour	Mike Doyle	1,133	58.6	
Conservative	Richard Seddon	577	29.8	
Liberal Democrats	Kenneth Knowles	223	11.5	
Majority		556	28.8	
Turnout		1,933	19.9	
Labour hold		Swing		

Sutton and Bold
Party	Candidate	Votes	%	±%
Liberal Democrats	Julie Jones	1,006	53.1	
Labour	Richard McCauley	804	42.4	
Conservative	Barbara Woodcock	85	4.5	
Majority		202	10.7	
Turnout		1,895	26.0	
Liberal Democrats gain from Labour		Swing		

Thatto Heath
Party	Candidate	Votes	%	±%
Labour	Marie Rimmer	861	65.3	
Liberal Democrats	Carol Pearl	207	15.7	
Conservative	Albert Pearson	184	14.0	
Socialist Labour	Michael Perry	66	5.0	
Majority		654	49.6	
Turnout		1,318	18.8	
Labour hold		Swing		

West Sutton (2 seats)
Party	Candidate	Votes	%	±%
Labour	Thomas Hargreaves	610		
Labour	William Noctor	505		
Liberal Democrats	Darren Makin	315		
Liberal Democrats	Stephen Topping	265		
Conservative	Charmian Pyke	101		
Turnout		1,796	15.4	
Labour hold		Swing		
Labour hold		Swing		

Windle (2 seats)
Party	Candidate	Votes	%	±%
Conservative	Wallace Ashcroft	903		
Labour	Geoffrey Almond	857		
Labour	Patricia Jackson	817		
Conservative	Anthony Rigby	801		
Liberal Democrats	Vivienne Lavery	217		
Liberal Democrats	Janette Smith	208		
Turnout		3,803	28.9	
Conservative gain from Labour		Swing		
Labour hold		Swing		
