= 2015 St Helens Metropolitan Borough Council election =

The 2015 St Helens Metropolitan Borough Council election took place on 7 May 2015 to elect members of St Helens Metropolitan Borough Council in England. This was on the same day as other local elections.

== Results by Ward (A-Z) ==
An asterisk (*) indicates an incumbent candidate.

Two asterisks (**) indicates an incumbent candidate seeking re-election in a different ward.

=== Billinge & Seneley Green ===
Billinge & Seneley Green
Party	Candidate	Votes	%	±%
Labour	Joe Pearson*	3,193	54.3	+6.7
Conservative	Judith Collins	1459	24.8	+10.5
Independent	Peter Peers	809	13.8	N/A
Green	Susan Rahman	418	7.1	+1.9
Majority		1734	29.5	+10.7
Turnout		5879	66.5	+22.2
Labour hold		Swing		

=== Blackbrook ===
Blackbrook
Party	Candidate	Votes	%	±%
Labour	Linda Maloney*	3,308	64.0	+1.8
UKIP	Jean Denny	919	18.0	−6.9
Conservative	Nancy Ashcroft	606	11.8	+4.7
Green	Ellen Finney	206	4.0	N/A
TUSC	Sean Marsh	80	1.6	N/A
Majority		2389	46.0	+8.7
Turnout		5119	62.0	+31.6
Labour hold		Swing		

=== Bold ===
Bold
Party	Candidate	Votes	%	±%
Labour	Anthony Johnson*	2,715	61.3	+4.6
UKIP	Marcus Oxley	644	14.5	−8.5
Conservative	Barbara Woodcock	549	12.4	+4.1
Liberal Democrats	Marise Roberts	289	6.5	+1.0
Green	Dave Parr	231	5.2	−1.2
Majority		2071	46.8	+13.1
Turnout		4428	58.9	+30.2
Labour hold		Swing		

=== Earlestown ===
Earlestown
Party	Candidate	Votes	%	±%
Labour	Keith Deakin*	2,872	62.0	−7.0
UKIP	Paul Brown	669	14.4	N/A
Green	Ian Fraser	627	13.5	+2.3
Conservative	Les Skeech	464	10.0	−1.7
Majority		2203	47.6	−9.7
Turnout		4632	56.4	+28.9
Labour hold		Swing		

=== Eccleston ===
Eccleston
Party	Candidate	Votes	%	±%
Liberal Democrats	Michael Haw*	2,935	44.6	−2.8
Labour	Paul Roberts	1821	27.7	+5.5
Conservative	John Cunliffe	959	14.6	+4.7
UKIP	Steve Broughton	597	9.1	−6.0
Green	Alison Donnelly	266	4.0	−1.4
Majority		1114	16.9	−8.3
Turnout		6578	71.0	+33.9
Liberal Democrats hold		Swing		

=== Haydock ===
Haydock
Party	Candidate	Votes	%	±%
Labour	Jeanette Banks*	3,072	57.1	−2.9
Labour	Martin Bond	2,650		
UKIP	Robert Lavin	945	17.6	−5.4
Conservative	Wallace Ashcroft	920	17.1	+7.0
UKIP	Ian Smith	825		
Green	David van der Burg	442	8.2	+3.2
Turnout		4427	49.2	+20.6
Labour hold		Swing		
Labour hold		Swing		

Two seats were up for election, due to the death of Labour Councillor Bill Anderton. Incumbent Labour Councillor Jeanette Banks retained her seat in the regular election, with Labour candidate Martin Bond retaining the seat vacated by Anderton.

=== Moss Bank ===
Moss Bank
Party	Candidate	Votes	%	±%
Labour	John Fulham*	3,181	58.4	+6.9
UKIP	Pat Shannon	1022	18.8	−5.4
Conservative	Margaret Harvey	863	15.8	+7.5
Green	Brian Hart	382	7.0	+0.4
Majority		2159	39.6	+12.3
Turnout		5448	64.8	+31.4
Labour hold		Swing		

=== Newton ===
Newton
Party	Candidate	Votes	%	±%
Labour	Sandra Dyer*	2,537	45.1	+0.2
Conservative	Brian Honey	1011	18.0	+6.3
UKIP	Mark Sherman	869	15.4	N/A
Liberal Democrats	David Smith	861	15.3	−20.2
Green	Rachel Parkinson	349	6.2	−1.6
Majority		1526	27.1	+15.7
Turnout		5627	65.0	+33.2
Labour hold		Swing		

=== Parr ===
Parr
Party	Candidate	Votes	%	±%
Labour	Keith Roberts*	3,185	72.4	+1.5
UKIP	John Beirne	714	16.2	−8.2
Conservative	Madeleine Wilcock	215	4.9	+0.2
Green	Mark Marsh	148	3.4	N/A
Independent	Paul Crimes	139	3.2	N/A
Majority		2471	56.2	+9.7
Turnout		4401	51.4	+27.6
Labour hold		Swing		

=== Rainford ===
Rainford
Party	Candidate	Votes	%	±%
Conservative	James Jones*	2,306	49.0	−4.5
Labour	Keith Aspinall	1610	34.2	+0.1
UKIP	Tony Parr	444	9.4	N/A
Green	Kevin Robinson	344	7.3	−0.4
Majority		696	14.8	−4.6
Turnout		4704	71.9	+34.4
Conservative hold		Swing		

=== Rainhill ===
Rainhill
Party	Candidate	Votes	%	±%
Labour	Joseph de Asha*	3,671	60.4	+8.1
Conservative	Kathleen Barton	1284	21.1	−1.6
UKIP	Harry Gibbons	718	11.8	−6.4
Green	Laura Taylor	403	6.6	−0.2
Majority		2387	39.3	+9.7
Turnout		6076	67.8	+33.4
Labour hold		Swing		

=== Sutton ===
Sutton
Party	Candidate	Votes	%	±%
Labour	Janet Johnson*	2,971	56.8	+6.0
UKIP	John Fairhurst	899	17.2	−4.5
Liberal Democrats	Brian Spencer	595	11.4	−8.1
Conservative	Dan Whitehouse	553	10.6	+5.4
Green	Gareth Leonard	214	4.1	+1.3
Majority		2072	39.6	+10.6
Turnout		5232	59.2	+27.6
Labour hold		Swing		

=== Thatto Heath ===
Thatto Heath
Party	Candidate	Votes	%	±%
Labour	Pat Ireland*	3,757	65.7	+4.4
UKIP	Alan Dutton	871	15.2	−4.4
Conservative	Tony Rigby	740	12.9	+5.0
Green	Damien Clarke	351	6.1	+0.4
Majority		2886	50.5	+8.8
Turnout		5719	59.9	+34.1
Labour hold		Swing		

=== Town Centre ===
Town Centre
Party	Candidate	Votes	%	±%
Labour	Carole Gill	2,759	66.4	+6.7
UKIP	Mark Hitchen	679	16.3	−10.8
Conservative	Henry Spriggs	377	9.1	+3.8
Green	Francis Williams	343	8.2	+3.9
Majority		2080	50.1	+17.5
Turnout		4158	52.9	+21.6
Labour hold		Swing		

=== West Park ===
West Park
Party	Candidate	Votes	%	±%
Labour	Marlene Quinn*	3,454	63.1	+1.4
UKIP	Paul Bosworth	821	15.0	−4.2
Conservative	Richard Barton	763	13.9	+5.9
Green	Andrew Gathercole	433	7.9	+0.9
Majority		2633	48.1	+5.7
Turnout		5471	63.6	+31.7
Labour hold		Swing		

=== Windle ===
Windle
Party	Candidate	Votes	%	±%
Labour	David Baines	2,664	51.6	+4.4
Conservative	Robert Reynolds	1131	21.9	+2.3
UKIP	Maria Parr	716	13.9	−5.6
Green	Ann Shacklady-Smith	345	6.7	−2.7
Liberal Democrats	Noreen Knowles	310	6.0	+1.7
Majority		1533	29.7	+2.1
Turnout		5166	64.4	+32.6
Labour hold		Swing		

== By-elections between 2015 and 2016 ==
=== Thatto Heath ===
A by-election was held in Thatto Heath on 21 January 2016 after the death of Labour councillor Sheila Seddon.

Thatto Heath by-election 21 January 2016
Party	Candidate	Votes	%	±%
Labour	Nova Charlton	964	71.1	+5.4
UKIP	Alastair Sutcliffe	182	13.4	−1.8
Conservative	Lisa Mackarell	147	10.8	−2.1
Green	Damien Clarke	62	4.6	−1.5
Majority		782	57.7	
Turnout		1,355		
Labour hold		Swing		
