= 2008 St Helens Metropolitan Borough Council election =

2008 UK local government election

Map of the results of the 2008 St Helens Metropolitan Borough Council election. Labour in red, Liberal Democrats in yellow and Conservatives in blue.

The 2008 St Helens Metropolitan Borough Council election took place on 1 May 2008 to elect members of St Helens Metropolitan Borough Council in Merseyside, England. One third of the council was up for election and the council stayed under no overall control.

After the election, the composition of the council was:

- Labour 23
- Liberal Democrats 19
- Conservative 6

== Background ==
At the last election in 2007, Labour remained the largest party with 21 seats, the Liberal Democrats has 20, Conservatives 6 and there was 1 independent. However soon after the election the independent councillor, Bessie Griffin, joined the Liberal Democrats. Since the 2006 election the Liberal Democrats and Conservatives had run the council together, while Labour was in opposition.

16 seats were contested in 2008 and as well as candidates from Labour, Liberal Democrats and the Conservatives, there were 10 candidates from the British National Party.

== Election result ==
Labour gained 2 seats to have 23 councillors, but fell 2 short of regaining a majority on the council, as the Liberal Democrats had 19 seats and the Conservatives 6. The Labour gains from the Liberal Democrats came in Billinge and Seneley Green and in West Park, while they held marginal seats in Haydock and Bold, with the result in Bold only coming after 3 recounts. The Labour gain in Billinge and Seneley Green meant the party regained the seat they had lost when councillor Bessie Griffin had left Labour to become an independent and then later joined the Liberal Democrats.

Following the election the Liberal Democrat and Conservative parties continued to run the council together, with Liberal Democrat Brian Spencer remaining leader of the council.

St Helens local election result 2008
Party	Seats	Gains	Losses	Net gain/loss	Seats %	Votes %	Votes	+/−
Labour	9	2	0	+2	56.3	37.0	16,730	-0.7
Liberal Democrats	5	0	2	-2	31.3	37.7	17,052	-3.7
Conservative	2	0	0	0	12.5	19.7	8,908	+2.7
BNP	0	0	0	0	0.0	5.6	2,528	+3.8

== Ward results ==
Billinge and Seneley Green
Party	Candidate	Votes	%	±%
Labour	Richard Ward	1,335	41.7	−0.8
Conservative	Michael Hodgson	1,292	40.4	+10.7
Liberal Democrats	Richard Gadsden	574	17.9	+0.2
Majority		43	1.3	−11.5
Turnout		3,201	35.5	+1.5
Labour gain from Liberal Democrats		Swing		

Blackbrook
Party	Candidate	Votes	%	±%
Labour	Eric Smith	1,207	46.4	−17.3
Liberal Democrats	Ruth Smith	1,016	39.0	+24.0
Conservative	Judith Collins	381	14.6	+1.6
Majority		191	7.3	−41.3
Turnout		2,604	31.8	+2.9
Labour hold		Swing		

Bold
Party	Candidate	Votes	%	±%
Labour	Tom Hargreaves	984	41.4	−1.5
Liberal Democrats	Marise Roberts	974	41.0	−2.9
BNP	Carl Telford	218	9.2	+9.2
Conservative	Charmian Pyke	198	8.3	+0.5
Majority		10	0.4	−0.6
Turnout		2,374	31.6	+2.9
Labour hold		Swing		

Earlestown
Party	Candidate	Votes	%	±%
Labour	Leon McGuire	1,242	52.0	+7.2
Liberal Democrats	David Smith	951	39.8	−1.3
Conservative	Brian Honey	196	8.2	−1.4
Majority		291	12.2	+8.5
Turnout		2,389	31.8	+1.6
Labour hold		Swing		

Eccleston
Party	Candidate	Votes	%	±%
Liberal Democrats	Teresa Sims	2,606	69.1	−0.7
Conservative	Kathleen Barton	549	14.6	−0.6
Labour	Pat Ireland	417	11.1	−3.8
BNP	Harry Berridge	197	5.2	+5.2
Majority		2,057	54.6	+0.0
Turnout		3,769	40.5	−0.9
Liberal Democrats hold		Swing		

Haydock
Party	Candidate	Votes	%	±%
Labour	James Caunce	1,390	45.5	+12.0
Liberal Democrats	Stephen Broughton	1,087	35.6	−24.0
Conservative	Anthony Rigby	299	9.8	+2.9
BNP	Karen Smith	278	9.1	+9.1
Majority		303	9.9	
Turnout		3,054	33.7	+0.1
Labour hold		Swing		

Moss Bank
Party	Candidate	Votes	%	±%
Liberal Democrats	Carole Kavanagh	1,911	62.5	+8.3
Labour	Jeffrey Fletcher	864	28.2	−9.5
Conservative	Elizabeth Black	285	9.3	+1.2
Majority		1,047	34.2	+17.8
Turnout		3,060	35.3	−0.5
Liberal Democrats hold		Swing		

Newton
Party	Candidate	Votes	%	±%
Liberal Democrats	Suzanne Knight	2,028	69.3	−0.4
Labour	Graham Barr	605	20.7	−0.6
Conservative	Margaret Harvey	293	10.0	+1.1
Majority		1,423	48.6	+0.2
Turnout		2,926	35.2	+0.3
Liberal Democrats hold		Swing		

Parr
Party	Candidate	Votes	%	±%
Labour	Ken Pinder	1,251	63.5	−5.7
Liberal Democrats	Josephine Ellison	506	25.7	+2.3
Conservative	Madeleine Wilcock	212	10.8	+3.4
Majority		745	37.8	−8.0
Turnout		1,969	23.0	−0.2
Labour hold		Swing		

Rainford
Party	Candidate	Votes	%	±%
Conservative	Betty Lowe	1,938	67.2	−4.5
Labour	David Wood	562	19.5	−2.2
BNP	Mathew Berridge-James	202	7.0	+7.0
Liberal Democrats	Frederick Barrett	184	6.4	−0.2
Majority		1,376	47.7	−2.4
Turnout		2,886	43.1	+0.2
Conservative hold		Swing		

Rainhill
Party	Candidate	Votes	%	±%
Labour	Michael Doyle	1,740	51.6	+5.7
Conservative	Helen Smith	877	26.0	−0.5
Liberal Democrats	Christina Duncan	455	13.5	−5.6
BNP	Frances Chesney	299	8.9	+0.4
Majority		863	25.6	+6.3
Turnout		3,371	37.6	+1.8
Labour hold		Swing		

Sutton
Party	Candidate	Votes	%	±%
Liberal Democrats	Brian Spencer	1,826	62.0	
Labour	Derek Maylor	686	23.3	
BNP	John Chesney	273	9.3	
Conservative	Pauline Wilcock	158	5.4	
Majority		1,140	38.7	
Turnout		2,943	31.8	+1.5
Liberal Democrats hold		Swing		

Thatto Heath
Party	Candidate	Votes	%	±%
Labour	Sheila Seddon	1,328	53.2	+4.9
Liberal Democrats	Carol Pearl	581	23.3	−6.8
Conservative	Barbara Woodcock	301	12.1	+4.5
BNP	Paul Telford	284	11.4	+4.3
Majority		747	30.0	+11.8
Turnout		2,494	28.1	−1.1
Labour hold		Swing		

Town Centre
Party	Candidate	Votes	%	±%
Liberal Democrats	John Beirne	1,193	48.9	+3.7
Labour	Geoff Almond	876	35.9	−3.5
BNP	Damian Smith	237	9.7	+1.7
Conservative	Jill Jones	134	5.5	+0.2
Majority		317	13.0	+7.2
Turnout		2,440	29.7	+0.2
Liberal Democrats hold		Swing		

West Park
Party	Candidate	Votes	%	±%
Labour	Robbie Ayres	1,493	50.3	−1.9
Liberal Democrats	David Evans	814	27.4	−7.1
BNP	Eric Swindells	331	11.2	+4.6
Conservative	Richard Barton	329	11.1	+5.9
Majority		679	22.9	+5.2
Turnout		2,967	33.2	−3.9
Labour gain from Liberal Democrats		Swing		

Windle
Party	Candidate	Votes	%	±%
Conservative	Wally Ashcroft	1,466	52.9	+3.2
Labour	Lynn Glover	750	27.1	−7.5
Liberal Democrats	Noreen Knowles	346	12.5	−3.2
BNP	Keith Davies	209	7.5	+7.5
Majority		716	25.8	+10.7
Turnout		2,771	34.9	−0.3
Conservative hold		Swing		

== By-elections between 2008 and 2010 ==
=== Parr ===
A by-election took place in Parr on 12 March 2009 after the death of Labour councillor Ken Pinder. The seat was held for Labour by Andy Bowden with a majority of 340 votes over Liberal Democrat Barry Dodd.

Parr by-election 12 March 2009
Party	Candidate	Votes	%	±%
Labour	Andy Bowden	851	49.3	−14.2
Liberal Democrats	Barry Dodd	511	29.6	+3.9
BNP	Paul Telford	183	10.6	+10.6
Independent	Mark Arnold	98	5.7	+5.7
Conservative	Madeleine Wilcock	55	3.2	−7.6
Green	Andrea Pennington	27	1.6	+1.6
Majority		340	19.7	−18.1
Turnout		1,725	20.1	−2.9
Labour hold		Swing		

=== Rainhill ===
A by-election took place in Rainhill on 12 March 2009 after the death of Labour councillor Mike Doyle. The seat was held for Labour by Barrie Grunewald with a majority of 503 votes over Liberal Democrat Denise Aspinall.

Rainhill by-election 12 March 2009
Party	Candidate	Votes	%	±%
Labour	Barrie Grunewald	1,562	45.6	−6.0
Liberal Democrats	Denise Aspinall	1,059	30.9	+17.4
Conservative	Stephen Bligh	512	14.9	−11.1
BNP	Eric Swindells	215	6.3	−2.6
Green	David Rothwell	80	2.3	+2.3
Majority		503	14.7	−10.9
Turnout		3,428	38.2	+0.6
Labour hold		Swing		

=== Moss Bank ===
A by-election was held in Moss Bank on 16 July 2009 after the death of Liberal Democrat councillor Anna Heyes. The seat was held for Liberal Democrats by David Kent with a majority of 469 votes over Labour's Jeffrey Fletcher.

Moss Bank by-election 16 July 2009
Party	Candidate	Votes	%	±%
Liberal Democrats	David Kent	1,480	53.9	−8.6
Labour	Jeffrey Fletcher	1,011	36.8	+8.6
Conservative	Madeleine Wilcock	111	4.0	−5.3
Green	David Rothwell	73	2.7	+2.7
Independent	Christopher Hackett	71	2.6	+2.6
Majority		469	17.1	−17.1
Turnout		2,746	31.8	−3.5
Liberal Democrats hold		Swing		
