= 2021 St Helens Metropolitan Borough Council election =

2021 UK local government election

Map showing the results of the 2021 St Helens Metropolitan Borough Council election

The 2021 St Helens Metropolitan Borough Council election took place on 6 May 2021 to elect members of St Helens Council in England. This was on the same day as other local elections. One-third of the seats were up for election, with one ward (Earlestown) electing two councillors.

== Results ==
2021 St Helens Metropolitan Borough Council election
Party	This election				Full council			This election		
Party	Candidates	Seats	Net	Seats %	Other	Total	Total %	Votes	Votes %	+/−
Labour	{{{candidates}}}	12	▼3	70.6	23	35	72.9	16,843	41.8	+5.4
Liberal Democrats	{{{candidates}}}	1	Steady	5.9	3	4	8.3	3,761	8.6	+2.3
Conservative	{{{candidates}}}	1	Steady	5.9	2	3	6.3	8,870	22.0	+7.8
Green	{{{candidates}}}	1	▲1	5.9	2	3	6.3	7,060	17.5	-7.1
Independent	{{{candidates}}}	2	▲2	11.8	1	3	6.3	3,761	9.3	+2.3
TUSC	{{{candidates}}}	0	Steady	0.0	0	0	0.0	129	0.3	New
For Britain	{{{candidates}}}	0	Steady	0.0	0	0	0.0	97	0.2	New
SDP	{{{candidates}}}	0	Steady	0.0	0	0	0.0	40	0.1	New

== Ward results ==
=== Billinge and Seneley Green ===
Billinge and Seneley Green
Party	Candidate	Votes	%	±%
Labour	Dennis McDonnell	1,197	42.5	▲5.9
Conservative	Nancy Ashcroft	952	33.8	▲17.8
Green	Sue Rahman	666	23.7	▼3.5
Majority		245		
Labour hold		Swing		

=== Blackbrook ===
Blackbrook
Party	Candidate	Votes	%	±%
Labour	Anthony Burns	1,080	49.7	▲13.1
Green	Emma Van Der Burg	723	33.3	▼7.8
Conservative	Melaine Lee	368	17.0	▲4.6
Majority		357		
Labour hold		Swing		

=== Bold ===
Bold
Party	Candidate	Votes	%	±%
Labour	Stuart Barton	654	31.6	
Green	Andrew Donnelly	459	22.2	
Independent	Allen Makin	378	18.2	
Liberal Democrats	Brian Spencer	299	14.4	
Conservative	Barbara Woodcock	282	13.6	
Majority		195		
Labour hold		Swing		

=== Earlestown ===
Earlestown
Party	Candidate	Votes	%	±%
Independent	Terry Maguire	1,395	34.2	
Labour	Jeanette Banks	1,159	29.3	
Labour	Charlie Preston	679	16.7	
Green	Paula Pietrzak	468	11.5	
Conservative	Allan Dockerty	374	9.2	
Majority				
Independent gain from Labour		Swing		
Labour hold		Swing		

=== Eccleston ===
Eccleston
Party	Candidate	Votes	%	±%
Liberal Democrats	Teresa Sims	2,085	63.1	
Labour	Andy Davidson	710	21.5	
Conservative	James Forshaw	509	15.4	
Majority		1,375		
Liberal Democrats hold		Swing		

=== Haydock ===
Haydock
Party	Candidate	Votes	%	±%
Green	Paul Hooton	1,319	53.3	
Labour	Paul Lynch	775	31.3	
Conservative	Judith Collins	332	13.4	
For Britain	Linda Collins	47	1.9	
Majority		544		
Green gain from Labour		Swing		

=== Moss Bank ===
Moss Bank
Party	Candidate	Votes	%	±%
Labour	Tracy Dickinson	1,144	49.3	
Conservative	Margaret Harvey	633	27.3	
Green	Deb Connor	303	13.1	
Liberal Democrats	Dave Kent	241	10.4	
Majority		511		
Labour hold		Swing		

=== Newton ===
Newton
Party	Candidate	Votes	%	±%
Labour	Seve Gomez-Aspron	1,544	49.9	
Liberal Democrats	Phil Cass	630	20.4	
Conservative	Lisa Cunliffe	589	19.0	
Green	John Richards	331	10.7	
Majority		914		
Labour hold		Swing		

=== Parr ===
Parr
Party	Candidate	Votes	%	±%
Labour	Andy Bowden	996	64.3	
Conservative	Madeleine Wilcock	284	18.3	
Green	Michael Skidmore	144	9.3	
Independent	Martin Ellison	126	8.1	
Majority		712		
Labour hold		Swing		

=== Rainford ===
Rainford
Party	Candidate	Votes	%	±%
Conservative	John Case	1,519	58.6	
Labour	Julian Hanley	673	26.0	
Green	David Anders	399	15.4	
Majority		846		
Conservative hold		Swing		

=== Rainhill ===
Rainhill
Party	Candidate	Votes	%	±%
Independent	Kate Stevenson	1,471	46.3	
Labour	Barrie Grunewald	1,101	34.7	
Conservative	Henry Spriggs	476	15.0	
TUSC	Phillip Speakman	129	4.1	
Majority		370		
Independent gain from Labour		Swing		

=== Sutton ===
Sutton
Party	Candidate	Votes	%	±%
Labour	Anthony Johnson	848	37.9	
Green	Stephen Granville	556	24.9	
Conservative	Mackenzie France	356	15.9	
Independent	David Hawley	252	11.3	
Liberal Democrats	Frederick Barrett	223	10.0	
Majority		292		
Labour hold		Swing		

=== Thatto Heath ===
Thatto Heath
Party	Candidate	Votes	%	±%
Labour	Nova Charlton	1,291	57.6	
Conservative	David Skeech	561	25.0	
Green	Terence Price	390	17.4	
Majority		730		
Labour hold		Swing		

=== Town Centre ===
Town Centre
Party	Candidate	Votes	%	±%
Labour	Anne McCormack	816	50.7	
Conservative	Iris Brown	324	20.1	
Green	Alison Donnelly	242	15.0	
Independent	Mark Hitchen	139	8.6	
For Britain	Tex Oakes	50	3.1	
SDP	Glynn Jones	40	2.5	
Majority		492		
Labour hold		Swing		

=== West Park ===
West Park
Party	Candidate	Votes	%	±%
Labour	Damien O'Connor	1,186	53.8	
Conservative	Richard Barton	557	25.3	
Green	Jess Northey	462	21.0	
Majority		629		
Labour hold		Swing		

=== Windle ===
Windle
Party	Candidate	Votes	%	±%
Labour	Lynn Clarke	1,020	43.2	
Conservative	John Cunliffe	745	31.5	
Green	Francis Williams	598	25.3	
Majority		275		
Labour hold		Swing		
