= 2010 St Helens Metropolitan Borough Council election =

2010 local election in England

Map of the results of the 2010 St Helens Metropolitan Borough Council election. Labour in red, Liberal Democrats in yellow and Conservatives in blue.

The 2010 St Helens Metropolitan Borough Council election took place on 6 May 2010 to elect members of St Helens Metropolitan Borough Council in Merseyside, England. One third of the council was up for election and the Labour Party gained overall control of the council from no overall control.

After the election, the composition of the council was:

- Labour 28
- Liberal Democrats 15
- Conservative 5

== Background ==
Before the election Labour were the largest party with 23 councillors, but the council was run by an alliance between the Liberal Democrats with 19 seats and the Conservatives with 6 seats. Seats were contested in all 16 of the wards at the 2010 election, with Labour needing a 2-seat swing to win a majority on the council.

== Election result ==
Labour gained 5 seats to take control of the council, with 28 councillors. This gave them an 8-seat majority over the Liberal Democrats with 15 seats and the Conservatives with 5 seats. Labour took Bold, Haydock, Moss Bank and Town Centre from the Liberal Democrats, including defeating the Liberal Democrat cabinet member Richard Ferry in Moss Bank. Meanwhile, Labour also gained Windle from the Conservatives.

Following the election Labour's Marie Rimmer became leader of the council for a third time.

St Helens local election result 2010
Party	Seats	Gains	Losses	Net gain/loss	Seats %	Votes %	Votes	+/−
Labour	12	5	0	+5	75.0	48.2	39,095	+11.2%
Liberal Democrats	3	0	4	-4	18.8	30.4	24,628	-7.3%
Conservative	1	0	1	-1	6.3	18.3	14,827	-1.4%
BNP	0	0	0	0	0	2.9	2,373	-2.7%
Independent	0	0	0	0	0	0.2	158	+0.2%

== Ward results ==
Billinge and Seneley Green
Party	Candidate	Votes	%	±%
Labour	Susan Murphy	2,964	49.6	+7.9
Conservative	Michael Hodgson	1,795	30.0	−10.1
Liberal Democrats	Thomas Gadsden	1,216	20.4	+2.5
Majority		1,169	19.6	+18.3
Turnout		5,975	67.1	+31.6
Labour hold		Swing		

Blackbrook
Party	Candidate	Votes	%	±%
Labour	Paul McQuade	2,881	57.7	+11.3
Liberal Democrats	Brian Bonney	1,276	25.6	−13.4
Conservative	Judith Collins	547	11.0	−3.6
BNP	Gail Lawley	290	5.8	+5.8
Majority		1,605	32.1	+24.8
Turnout		4,994	59.2	+27.4
Labour hold		Swing		

Bold
Party	Candidate	Votes	%	±%
Labour	Gareth Cross	2,074	48.3	+6.9
Liberal Democrats	Matthew Dunn	1,503	35.0	−6.0
Conservative	Charmian Pyke	426	9.9	+1.6
BNP	Marie Oakes	294	6.8	−2.4
Majority		571	13.3	+12.9
Turnout		4,297	57.4	+25.8
Labour gain from Liberal Democrats		Swing		

Earlestown
Party	Candidate	Votes	%	±%
Labour	Charles Banks	2,533	57.5	+5.5
Liberal Democrats	David Smith	1,146	26.0	−13.8
Conservative	Margaret Harvey	726	16.5	+8.3
Majority		1,387	31.5	+19.3
Turnout		4,405	54.3	+22.5
Labour hold		Swing		

Eccleston
Party	Candidate	Votes	%	±%
Liberal Democrats	Geoffrey Pearl	2,949	45.3	−23.8
Labour	Geoffrey Almond	1,940	29.8	+18.7
Conservative	Kathleen Barton	1,411	21.7	+7.1
BNP	David Cleverley	205	3.2	−2.0
Majority		1,009	15.5	−39.1
Turnout		6,505	70.0	+29.5
Liberal Democrats hold		Swing		

Haydock
Party	Candidate	Votes	%	±%
Labour	William Anderton	2,802	51.5	+6.0
Liberal Democrats	Eric Sheldon	2,015	37.0	+1.4
Conservative	Anthony Rigby	623	11.5	+1.7
Majority		787	14.5	+4.6
Turnout		5,440	60.1	+26.4
Labour gain from Liberal Democrats		Swing		

Moss Bank
Party	Candidate	Votes	%	±%
Labour	Jeffrey Fletcher	2,417	46.3	+18.1
Liberal Democrats	Richard Ferry	2,111	40.5	−22.0
Conservative	Elizabeth Black	689	13.2	+3.9
Majority		306	5.8	
Turnout		5,217	60.9	+25.6
Labour gain from Liberal Democrats		Swing		

Newton
Party	Candidate	Votes	%	±%
Liberal Democrats	Neil Taylor	2,441	48.3	−21.0
Labour	John Perry	1,785	35.3	+14.6
Conservative	Brian Honey	829	16.4	+6.4
Majority		656	13.0	−35.6
Turnout		5,055	59.7	+24.5
Liberal Democrats hold		Swing		

Parr
Party	Candidate	Votes	%	±%
Labour	Terence Shields	2,779	71.5	+8.0
Liberal Democrats	David Round	741	19.1	−6.6
Conservative	Madeleine Wilcock	364	9.4	−1.4
Majority		2,038	52.5	+14.7
Turnout		3,884	45.2	+22.2
Labour hold		Swing		

Rainford
Party	Candidate	Votes	%	±%
Conservative	Frederick Monk	2,356	49.3	−17.9
Labour	Keith Aspinall	1,634	34.2	+14.7
Liberal Democrats	Christopher Hackett	792	16.6	+10.2
Majority		722	15.1	−32.6
Turnout		4,782	71.4	+28.3
Conservative hold		Swing		

Rainhill
Party	Candidate	Votes	%	±%
Labour	Stephen Glover	2,789	46.3	−5.3
Liberal Democrats	Denise Aspinall	1,800	29.9	+16.4
Conservative	Stephen Bligh	1,160	19.3	−6.7
BNP	Leila Bentham	273	4.5	−4.4
Majority		989	16.4	−9.2
Turnout		6,022	66.3	+28.7
Labour hold		Swing		

Sutton
Party	Candidate	Votes	%	±%
Liberal Democrats	Stephanie Topping	2,327	44.9	−17.1
Labour	Alison Bacon	2,075	40.1	+16.8
Conservative	Barbara Woodcock	445	8.6	+3.2
BNP	Peter Clayton	333	6.4	−2.9
Majority		252	4.9	−33.8
Turnout		5,180	57.0	+25.2
Liberal Democrats hold		Swing		

Thatto Heath
Party	Candidate	Votes	%	±%
Labour	Richard McCauley	2,995	58.7	+5.5
Liberal Democrats	Julie Ollerhead	1,071	21.0	−2.3
Conservative	Richard Barton	684	13.4	+1.3
BNP	Paul Telford	349	6.8	−4.6
Majority		1,924	37.7	+7.7
Turnout		5,099	54.7	+26.6
Labour hold		Swing		

Town Centre
Party	Candidate	Votes	%	±%
Labour	Carole Gill	2,176	54.0	+18.1
Liberal Democrats	David Crowther	1,163	28.9	−20.0
Conservative	Helen Smith	351	8.7	+3.2
BNP	James Winstanley	341	8.5	−1.2
Majority		1,013	25.1	
Turnout		4,031	48.9	−19.2
Labour gain from Liberal Democrats		Swing		

West Park
Party	Candidate	Votes	%	±%
Labour	Marie Rimmer	3,063	58.7	+8.4
Liberal Democrats	Martin Johnson	1,070	20.5	−6.9
Conservative	Oliver Kretay	639	12.2	+1.1
BNP	Terence Oakes	288	5.5	−5.7
Independent	Patricia Robinson	158	3.0	+3.0
Majority		1,993	38.2	+15.3
Turnout		5,218	58.2	+25.0
Labour hold		Swing		

Windle
Party	Candidate	Votes	%	±%
Labour	Ellen Glover	2,188	44.0	+16.9
Conservative	Kenneth Roughley	1,782	35.8	−17.1
Liberal Democrats	Noreen Knowles	1,007	20.2	+7.7
Majority		406	8.2	
Turnout		4,977	62.1	+27.2
Labour gain from Conservative		Swing		

== By-elections between 2010 and 2011 ==
=== Billinge and Seneley Green ===
A by-election was held in Billinge and Seneley Green on 14 October 2010 after the death of Labour councillor Richard Ward. The seat was held for Labour by Alison Bacon with a majority of 664 votes over Conservative Elizabeth Black.

Billinge and Seneley Green by-election 14 October 2010
Party	Candidate	Votes	%	±%
Labour	Alison Bacon	1,288	56.4	+6.8
Conservative	Elizabeth Black	624	27.3	−2.7
Liberal Democrats	Thomas Gadsden	229	10.0	−10.4
BNP	James Winstanley	141	6.2	+6.2
Majority		664	29.1	+9.5
Turnout		2,282	24.8	−42.3
Labour hold		Swing		

=== Haydock ===
A by-election was held in Haydock on 2 December 2010 after the death of the longest serving Labour councillor in the country, Jim Caunce. The seat was held for Labour by Anthony Burns with a majority of 694 votes over Liberal Democrat Eric Sheldon.

Haydock by-election 2 December 2010
Party	Candidate	Votes	%	±%
Labour	Anthony Burns	1,234	62.7	+11.2
Liberal Democrats	Eric Sheldon	540	27.4	−9.6
Conservative	John Cunliffe	112	5.7	−5.8
BNP	James Winstanley	82	4.2	+4.2
Majority		694	35.3	+20.8
Turnout		1,968	20.4	−39.7
Labour hold		Swing		
