= 1998 St Helens Metropolitan Borough Council election =

1998 UK local government election

The 1998 St Helens Metropolitan Borough Council election took place on 7 May 1998 to elect members of St Helens Metropolitan Borough Council in Merseyside, England. One third of the council was up for election and the Labour Party stayed in overall control of the council.

After the election, the composition of the council was:

- Labour 42
- Liberal Democrats 10
- Conservative 2

== Election result ==
Both the Labour and Liberal Democrat group leaders said that they were pleased with the election results. Labour held control of the council after winning 13 of the 19 seats contested, leaving the party with 42 councillors. However the Liberal Democrats gained a seat in Newton East from Labour to have 10 seats and there was a vote swing from Labour to the Liberal Democrats. Meanwhile, the Conservatives gained 1 seat, after taking Rainford, to have 2 councillors.

St Helens local election result 1998
Party	Seats	Gains	Losses	Net gain/loss	Seats %	Votes %	Votes	+/−
Labour	13	0	2	-2	68.4	53.3	15,856	
Liberal Democrats	5	1	0	+1	26.3	31.7	9,430	
Conservative	1	1	0	+1	5.3	14.4	4,297	
Socialist Labour	0	0	0	0	0	0.6	182	

== Ward results ==
Billinge and Seneley Green
Party	Candidate	Votes	%	±%
Labour	Bessie Griffin	1,184	65.4	
Conservative	Joan Hall	335	18.5	
Liberal Democrats	Richard Ferry	291	16.1	
Majority		849	46.9	
Turnout		1,810		
Labour hold		Swing		

Blackbrook
Party	Candidate	Votes	%	±%
Labour	Linda Maloney	658	71.0	
Liberal Democrats	Stephen Broughton	187	20.2	
Conservative	Margaret Harvey	82	8.8	
Majority		471	50.8	
Turnout		927		
Labour hold		Swing		

Broad Oak
Party	Candidate	Votes	%	±%
Labour	John Pinder	914	71.5	
Liberal Democrats	Pauline Partington	275	21.5	
Conservative	Edna Ashby	50	3.9	
Socialist Labour	Ronald Waugh	40	3.1	
Majority		639	50.0	
Turnout		1,279		
Labour hold		Swing		

Eccleston
Party	Candidate	Votes	%	±%
Liberal Democrats	Teresa Sims	1,544	64.9	
Conservative	John Goodacre	418	17.6	
Labour	Stephen Glover	416	17.5	
Majority		1,126	47.4	
Turnout		2,378		
Liberal Democrats hold		Swing		

Grange Park
Party	Candidate	Votes	%	±%
Labour	Terence Hanley	667	59.3	
Liberal Democrats	David Evans	271	24.1	
Conservative	Catherine Lindon	187	16.6	
Majority		396	35.2	
Turnout		1,125		
Labour hold		Swing		

Haydock
Party	Candidate	Votes	%	±%
Labour	William Swift	1,178	71.7	
Liberal Democrats	Carole Worthington	205	12.5	
Conservative	Judith Collins	169	10.3	
Socialist Labour	Andrew Rimaitis	90	5.5	
Majority		973	59.3	
Turnout		1,642		
Labour hold		Swing		

Marshalls Cross
Party	Candidate	Votes	%	±%
Liberal Democrats	John Beirne	1,127	71.2	
Labour	Ronald Cooke	415	26.2	
Conservative	Jill Jones	40	2.5	
Majority		712	45.0	
Turnout		1,582		
Liberal Democrats hold		Swing		

Moss Bank
Party	Candidate	Votes	%	±%
Liberal Democrats	Carole Kavanagh	1,329	54.4	
Labour	Michael McGough	1,025	42.0	
Conservative	William Highcock	88	3.6	
Majority		304	12.4	
Turnout		2,442		
Liberal Democrats hold		Swing		

Newton East
Party	Candidate	Votes	%	±%
Liberal Democrats	Neil Taylor	928	49.2	
Labour	Thomas Chisnall	799	42.4	
Conservative	Brian Honey	158	8.4	
Majority		129	6.8	
Turnout		1,885		
Liberal Democrats gain from Labour		Swing		

Newton West
Party	Candidate	Votes	%	±%
Labour	Keith Deakin	1,028	66.2	
Liberal Democrats	David Crowther	403	25.9	
Conservative	Stephen Holt	123	7.9	
Majority		625	40.2	
Turnout		1,554		
Labour hold		Swing		

Parr and Hardshaw
Party	Candidate	Votes	%	±%
Labour	Mark Arnold	743	79.9	
Liberal Democrats	Michael Ellis	133	14.3	
Conservative	Thomas Brooke	54	5.8	
Majority		610	65.6	
Turnout		930		
Labour hold		Swing		

Queens Park
Party	Candidate	Votes	%	±%
Labour	Patricia Ireland	782	65.2	
Liberal Democrats	Vivienne Lavery	306	25.5	
Conservative	Margaret Bolton	112	9.3	
Majority		476	39.7	
Turnout		1,200		
Labour hold		Swing		

Rainford
Party	Candidate	Votes	%	±%
Conservative	John Brown	1,293	54.1	
Labour	John Appleton	933	39.1	
Liberal Democrats	Sharon Birch	162	6.8	
Majority		360	15.1	
Turnout		2,388		
Conservative gain from Labour		Swing		

Rainhill
Party	Candidate	Votes	%	±%
Labour	Phillip Speakman	1,054	63.8	
Conservative	Richard Seddon	376	22.8	
Liberal Democrats	Kenneth Knowles	222	13.4	
Majority		678	41.0	
Turnout		1,652		
Labour hold		Swing		

Sutton and Bold
Party	Candidate	Votes	%	±%
Liberal Democrats	Brian Spencer	1,353	58.4	
Labour	Derek Maylor	912	39.4	
Conservative	Herbert Williams	51	2.2	
Majority		441	19.0	
Turnout		2,316		
Liberal Democrats hold		Swing		

Thatto Heath (2 seats)
Party	Candidate	Votes	%	±%
Labour	Patricia Robinson	862		
Labour	Sheila Hudson	722		
Liberal Democrats	Carol Pearl	156		
Liberal Democrats	John Brown	130		
Conservative	Albert Pearson	108		
Socialist Labour	Michael Perry	52		
Turnout		2,030		
Labour hold		Swing		
Labour hold		Swing		

West Sutton
Party	Candidate	Votes	%	±%
Labour	Frank Robinson	671	73.3	
Liberal Democrats	Darren Makin	185	20.2	
Conservative	Charmian Pyke	60	6.6	
Majority		486	53.1	
Turnout		916		
Labour hold		Swing		

Windle
Party	Candidate	Votes	%	±%
Labour	Graham Whiteside	893	52.3	
Conservative	Anthony Rigby	593	34.7	
Liberal Democrats	Audrey Ashall	223	13.0	
Majority		300	17.6	
Turnout		1,709		
Labour hold		Swing		

== By-elections between 1998 and 1999 ==
=== Marshalls Cross ===
Marshalls Cross by-election 21 January 1999
Party	Candidate	Votes	%	±%
Liberal Democrats		848	69.0	−2.2
Labour		352	28.6	+2.4
Conservative		16	1.3	−1.2
Socialist Labour		13	1.1	+1.1
Majority		496	40.4	−4.6
Turnout		1,229	19.9	
Liberal Democrats hold		Swing		

=== Newton West ===
A by-election took place in Newton West on 21 January 1999 to replace Labour councillor Martin Schofield. The seat was gained for the Liberal Democrats by Virginia Taylor with a majority of 145 votes over Labour's Thomas Chisnall after a 25% swing.

Newton West by-election 21 January 1999
Party	Candidate	Votes	%	±%
Liberal Democrats	Virginia Taylor	842	53.2	+27.3
Labour	Thomas Chisnall	697	44.0	−22.2
Conservative	Brian Honey	44	2.8	−5.1
Majority		145	9.2	
Turnout		1,583	19.6	
Liberal Democrats gain from Labour		Swing		

=== Thatto Heath ===
Thatto Heath by-election 21 January 1999
Party	Candidate	Votes	%	±%
Labour		493	76.1	+3.3
Liberal Democrats		61	9.4	−3.8
Conservative		47	7.3	−1.9
Socialist Unity		47	7.3	+2.4
Majority		432	66.7	
Turnout		648	9	
Labour hold		Swing		
