= Blackbrook, St Helens =

Coordinates: 53.466°N 2.699°W

Blackbrook
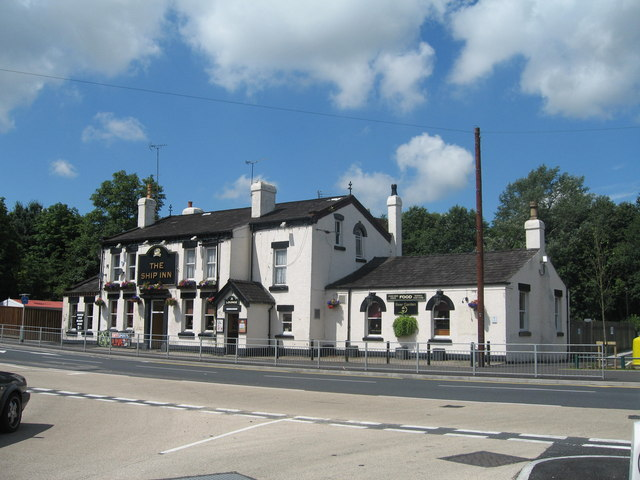
- The Ship Inn public house, Blackbrook

- Location within Merseyside
- Population: 10,639 (2011.Ward)
- OS grid reference: SJ525951
- Metropolitan borough: St. Helens
- Metropolitan county: Merseyside
- Region: North West
- Country: England
- Sovereign state: United Kingdom
- Post town: ST. HELENS
- Postcode district: WA9
- Dialling code: 01744
- Police: Merseyside
- Fire: Merseyside
- Ambulance: North West
- UK Parliament: St Helens North

Blackbrook is a locality and an electoral ward in St Helens, Merseyside. Historically in Lancashire, the area is so called after the brook of the same name. The population of the ward taken at the 2011 census was 10,639. The Blackbrook area is situated in the north east of St Helens Borough and is historically part of the Parr township.

The source of the actual brook itself is created from headwaters in Upholland, West Lancashire, and a section of it forms the boundary between the townships of Parr, Haydock and Ashton in Makerfield.

== History ==
In 1770, the Penny Bridge branch of the Sankey Canal was extended through Blackbrook, adjacent to the brook, to facilitate the transport of coal from the Stanley Colliery, Ashton in Makerfield.

== Education ==
Schools in the area include St Augustine of Canterbury Catholic Academy, St Mary's Blackbrook Roman Catholic Primary School and Ashurst Primary School.

== Sport ==
Blackbrook A.R.L.F.C. amateur rugby league team, founded in 1975, play at Boardmans Lane. Blackbrook has been a feeder club for St. Helens, Wigan and Warrington and many players have been produced from this amateur team who have entered into the professional ranks of rugby league.

Amongst the notables being Brian Case and Barry Williams.

Steve Ganson, a former rugby league referee, attended both Blackbrook Roman Catholic Primary School and St. Augustine of Canterbury High School. A signed Steve Ganson jersey from the Rugby League World Cup (in which he refereed) still hangs at St. Augustine of Canterbury High School to this day.
