= Windle, St Helens =

Area of St Helens, Merseyside, England

Coordinates: 53.4689°N 2.7673°W

Windle
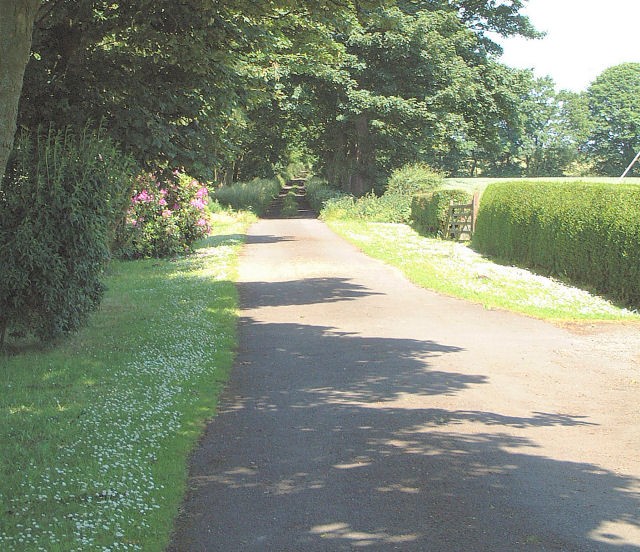
- Lord Derby's Footpath, Windle

- Location within Merseyside
- Population: 10,690 (2011.Ward)
- OS grid reference: SJ4916297181
- Civil parish: Windle
- Metropolitan borough: St Helens
- Metropolitan county: Merseyside
- Region: North West
- Country: England
- Sovereign state: United Kingdom
- Post town: ST. HELENS
- Postcode district: WA10, WA11
- Dialling code: 01744
- Police: Merseyside
- Fire: Merseyside
- Ambulance: North West
- UK Parliament: St Helens North

Windle is a suburb of St Helens, civil parish and ward of the metropolitan borough of the same name. The population of Windle was given as 10,690 at the 2011 Census. It was one of the original four townships alongside Eccleston, Parr and Sutton formed that merged to become St Helens. The name derives from Windy Hill.

== History ==
Windleshaw Chantry, two engravings from the 19th century, and a photo of the remains in situ

Within the boundaries of the historic county of Lancashire, Windhull, 1201, (and common; Wyndhill, 1320; Wyndhyll, Wyndill, Wyndell, Wyndle, 16th century) a Manor originally fell under the fee of the Warrington Barons until at least 1585. The first Baron is listed as Pain de Vilers. Vilers was disenfranchised by William de Ferrers the Earl of Derby to the benefit of William le Boteler from Warrington. The Manor was subject to contesting claims by the Vilers to no avail. Portions of Windle over the next three hundred years were divided between the families local gentry Peter de Burnhull, Alan de Windle III and Thurstan de Holand The de Burnhull family married into the Gerard family from nearby Kingsley in Cheshire who were the eventual inheritors of the land and title.

The present Windle Hall was built in 1782 and leased to Dr William Pilkington (whose sons founded the glassmaking firm) in 1795. The Pilkington family continued to live there until the death of Lady Mavis Pilkington in 1998.

Other significant families were the Colleys (or Cowleys), Hindley and Urmstons. The families of Harflynch and Eccles appear in the 16th century; and others of the neighbourhood, like the Byroms, Parrs, and Woodfalls, were also owners of land. Adam Martindale, a puritan divine, born near Mossbank in 1623, recorded daily life and events of the area in his diaries, describing the chapelry and family interactions.

18th-century Windle was originally constituted by the villages and areas of Cowley Hill, Gerards Bridge, Hardshaw, Islands Brow, Laffak, Moss Bank, Pocket Nook, Windle Ashes and Windle Smithy. Hardshaw (or antiquated Hardsheigh), described as a Berewick in the Domesday Book was the site of The Chapel of St Elyn in Chapel Lane. The modern town of St Helens was formed around the Chapel of St Elyn that was located within the Hardshaw berewick since at least the 16th century.

In 1910 the area was said to cover 3,150 acres (12.7 km^{2}).

=== Windleshaw Chantry ===
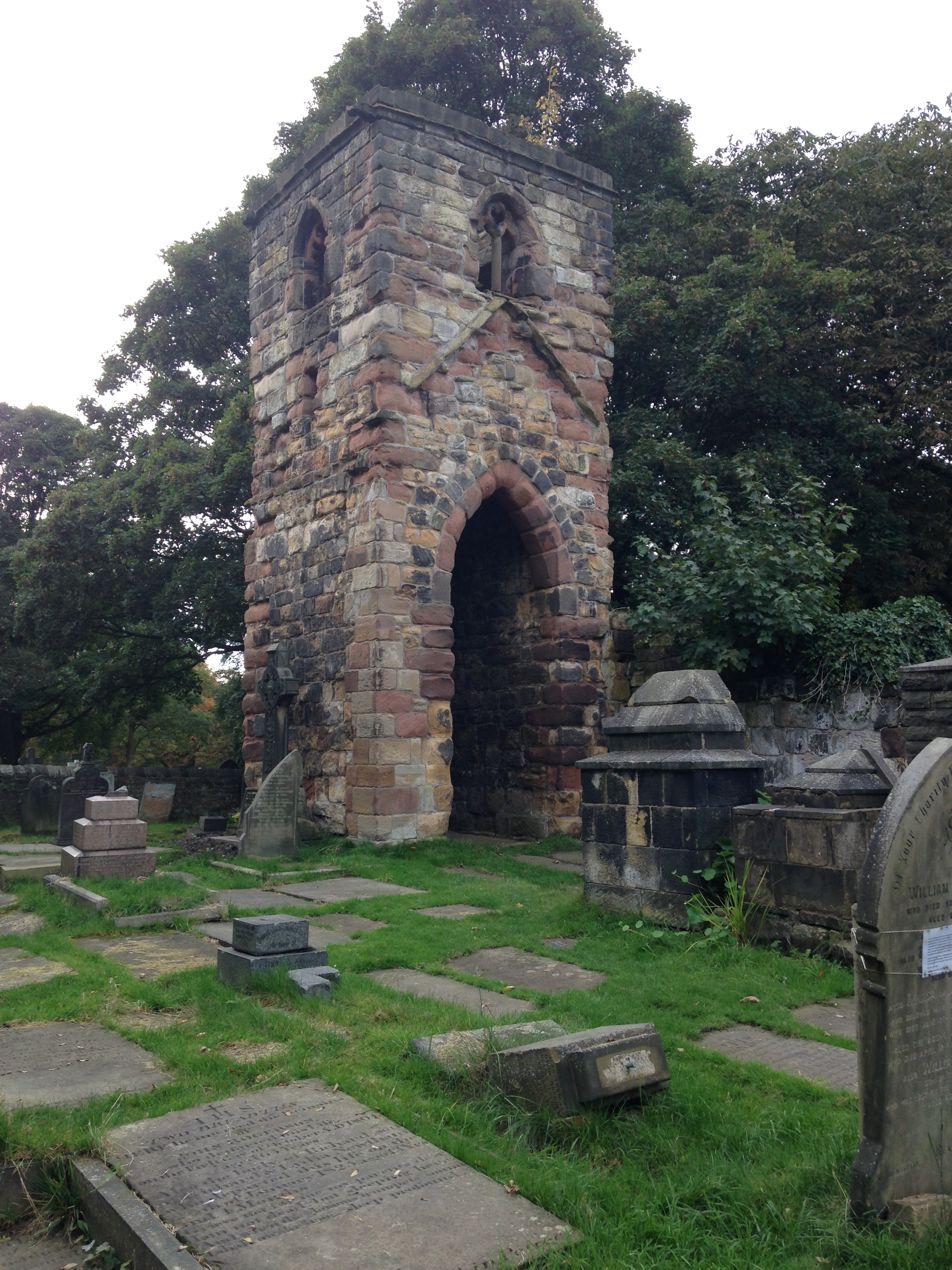
A modern photograph of the remains of Windleshaw Chantry

Windleshaw Chantry is the oldest structure in St. Helens. It was built in 1435 by Sir Thomas Gerard, following his return from the Battle of Agincourt around 1415 Windleshaw Chantry receives a mention in literature in the poetical illustration Windleshaw Abbey by Letitia Elizabeth Landon, to an engraving of a painting by G. Pickering, published in Fisher's Drawing Room Scrap Book, 1835.

== Governance ==
Windle is one of 16 wards in the Metropolitan Borough of St Helens.

Until 1834 Windle was part of the ancient West Derby hundred before becoming part of the district of the Prescot Parish and Poor Law Union (as was much of St Helens). In 1834 St Helens was established as a Sub District before becoming a charter borough in 1868.

The Windle Parish was reduced as an official body in 1894 to allow for the creation of the St Helens Civil Parish. In 1934 it was again reduced. Windle falls under the remit of the unitary authority of St Helens Council, while Windle Parish Council retains authority for some local matters within the community.

== Education facilities ==
Cowley International College and De La Salle School are the two secondary schools in the area.

Bleak Hill, Rivington and St Thomas of Canterbury are the main primary schools in the area.

== Infrastructure ==
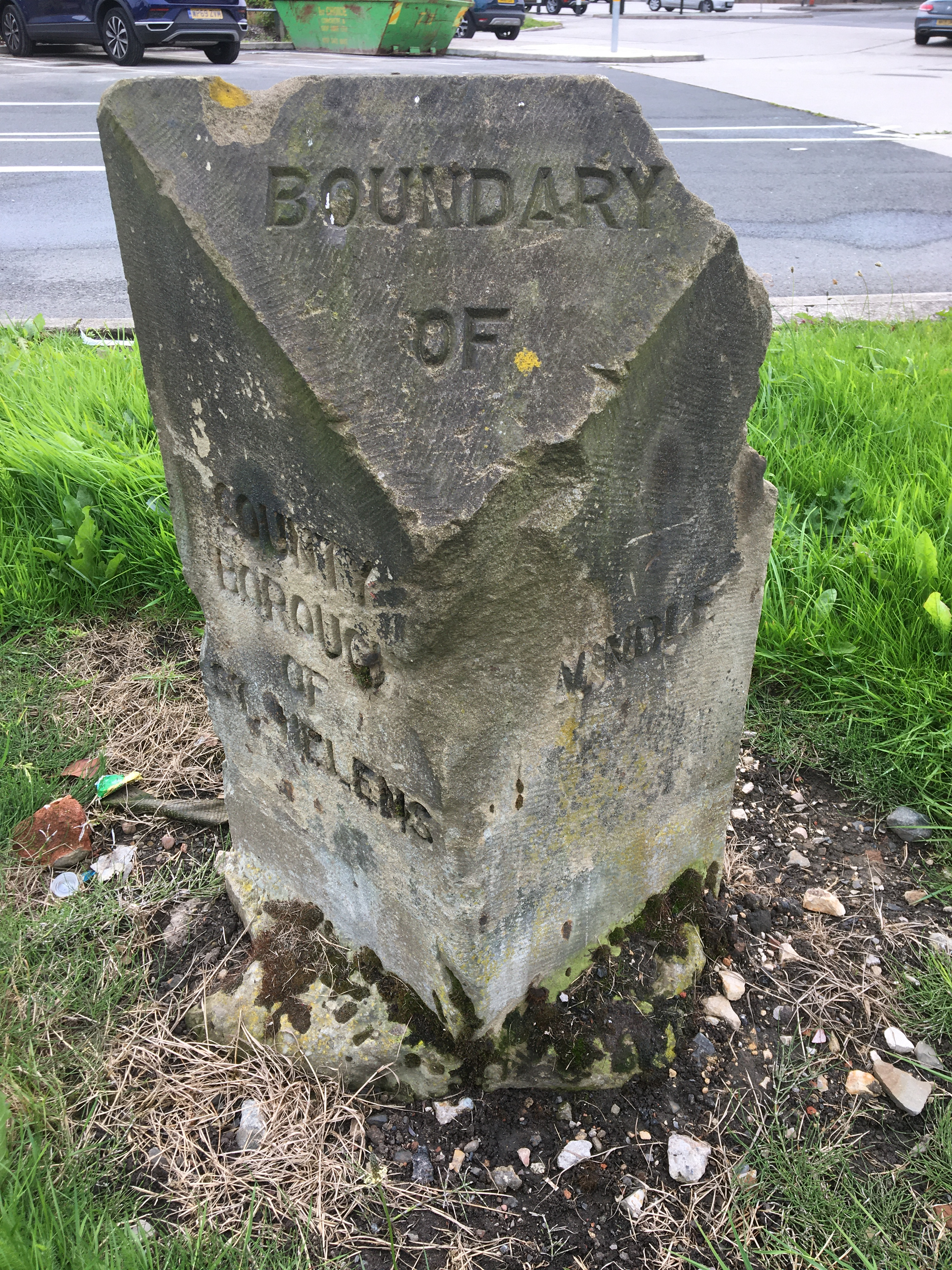
This historic boundary stone stands close to Windle Island.

The main access route that links Windle to St Helens town centre is the A570 (Rainford Road), the area also being within walking distance of the A580 (East Lancashire Road), that links Liverpool and Manchester. The A580 is renowned for its traffic problems particularly at the Windle Island junction, where during rush hour traffic congestion can be expected. It has also been the site of numerous car accidents.

== Entertainment and leisure ==
The area has two leisure centres in the suburb of Dentons Green, Queens Park and Ruskin. The Queens Park complex contains facilities for swimming, keep fit, bowling, tennis, basketball, rugby and football. Ruskin has a gym and swim pool, cricket, rounders, football and rugby fields, as well as function and business suites.

Public open spaces include Queens Park, Cowley Hill, Bishop Road and Victoria Park.

== Sport ==
Windle is home to Rugby Union team Liverpool St Helens FC.

St Helens Recreation Cricket Club, aka St Helens Recs, is based in Ruskin Drive, formerly Pilkington's Sports Ground.

FC St Helens is based at Windleshaw Sports on Windleshaw Road.
