= Education services in St Helens, Merseyside =

St Helens is a town and Metropolitan Borough in Merseyside, England. The Borough Council is the area’s local authority, and so is responsible for the development and maintenance of learning establishments in the region.

The Children & Young People's Services is the primary Department, with several sub-divisions responsible in part for meeting education needs and national standards:

- Performance and Strategy
- Resources and Support Services
- Achievement and Inclusion
- Integrated and Specialist Services

== History of education authorities in St Helens ==
From 1870 until 1902 the Education centres in the town and borough were operated by School Boards responsible for promoting and developing scholastic learning in the local area. The Education Act 1902 established grounds requiring the formation of a Local Education Authority responsible for the development and maintenance of schools within the Local Authority, superseding the School Board.

Between 1902 and 1988 St Helens LEA was responsible for monitoring and developing all the Boroughs schools and learning centres from pre-school through to Further Education establishments. The 1902 provision granted purview to monitor and provide overview to Religious Education establishments. The Education Reform Act 1988 relieved the LEA of its duties over Further Education establishments. St Helens Polytechnic / College became a corporation at that point.

The Children Act 2004 required the formation of the a Director of Children's Services, drawing the Children's Services and LEA operating services fully under the umbrella of the Local Authority and abolishing references to an LEA.

== The modern role of the education authority in St Helens ==
The Council provides many services with regards to the operation of the schools within the borough working closely with the schools in the formation of Governing Bodies. The Council is also responsible for admissions, transport and library services. The authority is also responsible for coordinating with other benefit departments for the operation and catering of school meals, and the free school meal service.

The Council provides several services in addition to schools. Initiatives such as Adult education courses are operated from Libraries, schools, and education centres across the borough providing learning opportunities specialising in Adult Literacy & Numeracy, Computers, First Aid, Languages and skills for work.

=== Coordinating with other agencies ===
St Helens Council operates their education services in association with several Government and Private schemes and initiatives. The Council has coordinated with the Sure Start service.

The Building Schools for the Future scheme was involved in the redevelopment of Cowley Language School.

== Further education colleges ==
A list of Further Education establishments in St Helens:

- Carmel College
- St Helens College
- Rainhill Sixth Form Centre
- Cronton College
