= Bold, St Helens =

Coordinates: 53.42392°N 2.69339°W

Bold
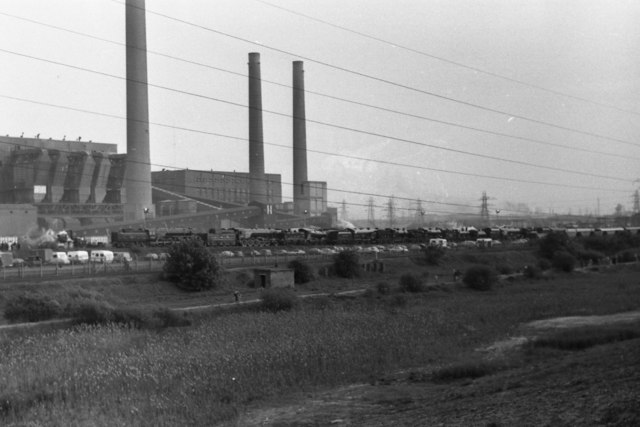
- Bold Power Station in 1980

- Location within Merseyside
- Population: 3,577 (2021 census)
- OS grid reference: SJ540921
- Civil parish: Bold
- Metropolitan borough: St Helens
- Metropolitan county: Merseyside
- Region: North West
- Country: England
- Sovereign state: United Kingdom
- Post town: St. Helens
- Postcode district: WA9
- Dialling code: 01744
- Police: Merseyside
- Fire: Merseyside
- Ambulance: North West
- UK Parliament: St Helens South and Whiston

Bold is a civil parish in the Metropolitan Borough of St Helens in Merseyside, England. Bold itself is situated to the south east of St Helens, near to the boundaries with Halton and Warrington. The parish extends southwards beyond the M62 motorway and includes the hamlet of Bold Heath along with the Clock Face and New Bold areas of St Helens. Bold had a population of 3,577 at the 2021 census.

== History ==
Within the boundaries of the historic county of Lancashire, Bold is on the former site of the estate of Bold Hall. Almost 7,000 acres (2,800 ha) in 1848, the estate was home of the ancient family of Bolde, who settled there before the Norman Conquest and ran the estate for hundreds of years. When Peter Bold MP died in 1762, leaving three daughters but no son, the estate passed out of the hands of the family and was eventually broken up. The Hall and the remaining 1,500 acres (610 ha) were sold in 1893 to a syndicate of colliery proprietors.

The 150th anniversary event of the Liverpool and Manchester Railway and the Rainhill Trials was held on the extensive rail sidings at Bold in May 1980. The event featured a working replicas of Stephenson's Rocket and Sans Pareil, a tilting train and a selection of main line railway locomotives. Bold Colliery was the last coal mine in Britain to use steam locomotives, ending the practice in the autumn of 1982.

There are proposals for a garden village of 3,000 houses at Bold Forest to the south of St Helens Junction station.

== Demographics ==
At the 2021 census, the civil parish had a population of 3,577 people in 1,497 households.

Census population of Bold parish
Census	Population	Female	Male	Households	Source
2001	2,283	1,164	1,119	932	
2011	3,410	1,743	1,667	1,429	
2021	3,577	1,820	1,757	1,497	

== Economy ==
The Bold area was the site of Bold Colliery, with Bold Power Station on adjacent land. The coal fired power stations had a total electricity generating capacity of 300 megawatts, and when completed in 1960, it was the largest such generating facility in the north west. The power station had a direct coal conveyor belt link from a washery at the colliery. Extensive rail sidings were also used for coal delivery, either from Bold Colliery or from other collieries via the main Liverpool to Manchester Lines. The coal from Bold Colliery was deep mined and therefore costly to recover. In later years, due to commercial reasons, the main coal supply became mostly by road from either Yorkshire or Scotland.

The colliery and power stations are now closed, with the latter site redeveloped for housing and the creation of public open spaces. Other industry in the area included a large engineering works which is now an industrial estate.

== Transport ==
Many bus services serve the Bold ward including Arriva North West's 32/32A/32C, 33/33A, 121 and 122, Merseytravel's 140, 265 and 141 services, Halton Transport's 17/17A/17B and Strawberry Bus' Line 1 service. However, there are no railway stations located in the ward, with the nearest being Lea Green railway station and St Helens Junction railway station located in the Sutton area.

== Facilities ==
The area contains a number of facilities including a miners' club and a Labour club (all of which are located in Clock Face) and a series of mini supermarkets and off-licences. The Clock Face public house closed in 2024 and is in the process of being converted to a SEND school.

== See also ==
- Listed buildings in Bold, St Helens
