= Bold Power Station =

Former power stations

Bold Power Stations
- Country: UK
- Location: St Helens, Merseyside
- Coordinates: 53.4340°N 2.6883°W
- Status: Decommissioned and demolished
- Commission date: B: November 1958
- Decommission date: A: 31 October 1981 B: 1989
- Owners: Central Electricity Generating Board; National Power
- Operator: As owner

Thermal power station
- Primary fuel: Coal
- Turbine technology: Steam
- Chimneys: A: 2 B: 1
- Cooling towers: A: 2 B: 3
- Cooling source: Cooling towers

Power generation
- Units operational: A: 4 × 32 MW B: 3 × 60 MW
- Make and model: A: Metropolitan-Vickers and Associated Electrical Industries B: General Electric Company
- Annual net output: A: 272.4 GWh (1971–2) B: 500 GWh (1971–2)

Bold Power Station refers to a series of two coal-fired power stations in Bold near St Helens, Merseyside, North West England. They were closed, decommissioned and demolished between 1981 and 1992, and a housing estate now occupies the site.

== History ==
Bold A and B Power Stations were coal fired, with a direct coal conveyor belt link from a washery at the colliery. This fed either directly to coal bunkers in both stations or to a stocking area. The extensive rail sidings were utilised for coal delivery, either from Bold Colliery or from other collieries via the main Liverpool to Manchester Lines. The coal from Bold Colliery was deep mined and therefore costly to recover. In later years, due to commercial reasons, the main coal supply became mostly by road from either Yorkshire or Scotland.

The 'A' power station had an installed capacity of 120 MW. It consisted of four 30 MW two-cylinder turbines/alternators manufactured by Metropolitan-Vickers and Associated Electrical Industries (AEI). No.3 M/C was installed with the first direct water-cooled alternator. Steam was supplied from four Yarrow & Co. coal-fired boilers with tangentially fired tilting pulverized fuel burners, with 3no type LM13 table mills made by International Combustion of Derby.

The 180 MW 'B' power station was installed with three Fraser & Chalmers 60 MW machines. It used a central unit control system with the turbine/hydrogen cooled alternators manufactured by the General Electric Company (GEC). As with 'A' power station, No.3 alternator was a prototype direct water-cooled machine. The coolant water was fed via glass tubes on the three-phase connections. Each unit had boilers manufactured by John Thompson of Wolverhampton, each using two suction ball mills each with two exhausters, these feeding to twelve front wall pulverized fuel burners. The boilers were rated at 550,000 lb/hr (69 kg/s) and fed steam at 900 psi/900 degrees Fahrenheit (62.06 bar and 482 °C) directly to each turbine/alternator. The station had some unusual features for the time. Firstly in using water from the local sewage treatment works for cooling purposes and secondly in having a dry ash handling system.

The electricity output from Bold A was as follows:

Bold A electricity output 1955–79, GWh
Year	1954	1955	1956	1957	1958	1961	1962	1963	1967	1972	1979
Station output, GWh	20.30	174.796	352.722	344.673	551.88	525.0	508.9	722.1	524.7	272.41	157.78
Thermal efficiency, %	23.16	25.61	26.59	26.46	26.52	25.96	25.45	25.60	24.58	22.67	22.75

The electricity output from Bold B was as follows:

Bold B electricity output 1961–82, GWh
Year	1961	1962	1963	1967	1972	1979	1982
Station output, GWh	935.22	846.5	971.4	967.977	499.825	639.851	600.314
Load factor, %	63.6	57.5	66.01	65.8	33.9	43.5	40.8
Thermal efficiency, %	28.41	28.54	28.50	28.26	26.07	639.851	27.99

The Bold area was the site of Bold Colliery, with Bold A and B Power Stations on adjacent land. These power stations had a total electricity generating capacity of 300 megawatts (MW). At the time of completion, between 1958 and 1960, they were the largest such generating facility in the north west. Bold "A" Station closed on 26 October 1981. Bold "B" continued to run until the late 80's after it was privatised from the Central Electricity Generating Board to National Power. The B Station closed in 1991 and was soon after demolished, with the site’s 3 cooling towers and chimney demolished on the 29th March 1992. The site has since been redeveloped for housing and public open spaces. Other industry in the area included a large engineering works which is now an industrial estate.

== See also ==
- St Helens power station
