= In Demand Radio =

Coordinates: 53.4177°N 3.0456°W

Liverpool; United Kingdom
- Broadcast area: Merseyside; North West England; North Wales
- Frequency: DAB: 10D North East Wales & West Cheshire

Programming
- Format: Rhythmic Contemporary

Ownership
- Owner: In Demand Global Ltd

History
- First air date: November 9, 2020

Technical information
- Licensing authority: Ofcom

Links
- Webcast: In Demand Radio Player
- Website: In Demand Radio

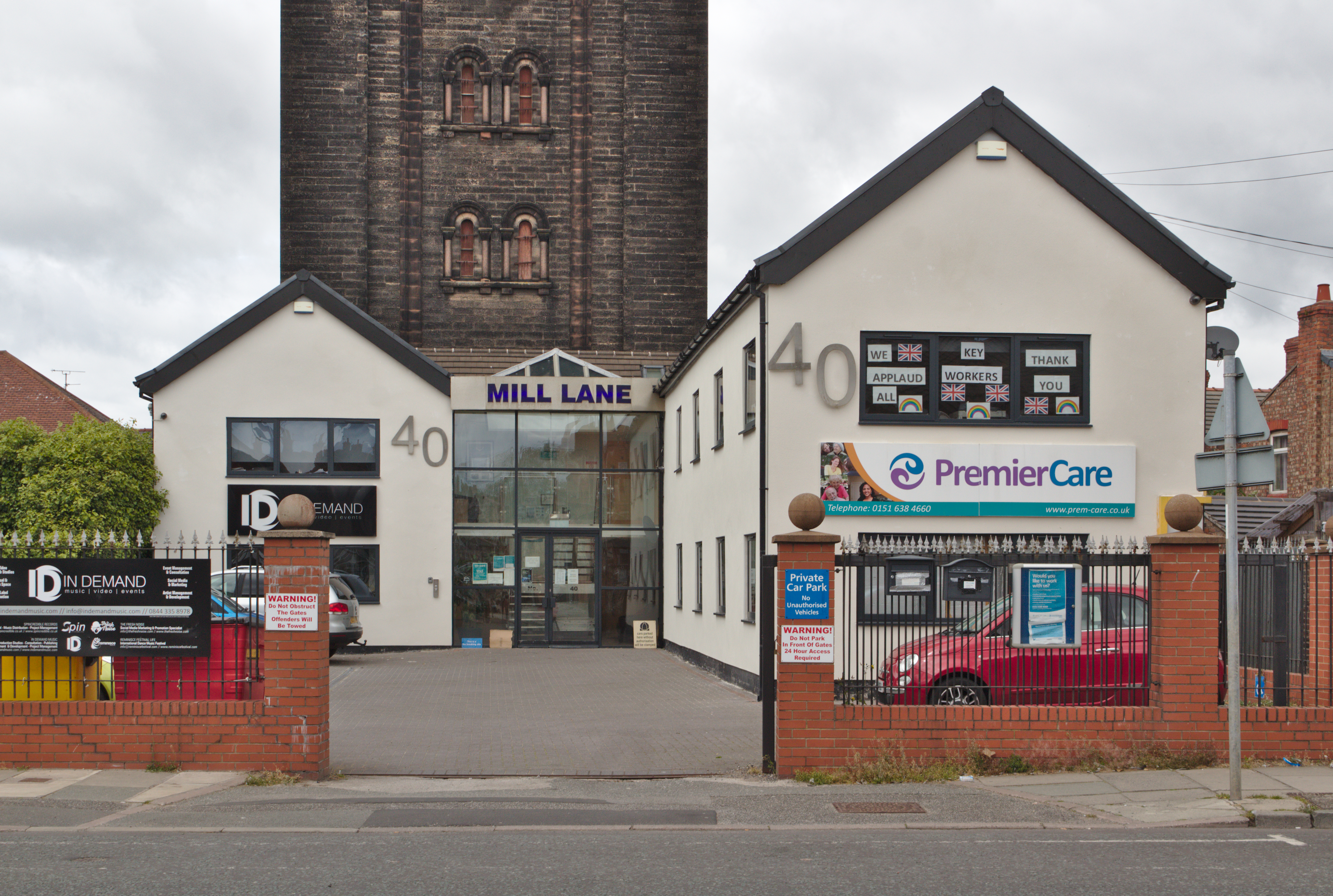
In Demand Radio is based in studios at 40 Mill Lane, Wallasey

In Demand Radio is a commercial radio station based in Wallasey, Merseyside. The station broadcasts a Rhythmic Contemporary format to Liverpool, North West England and North Wales. It is owned and operated by In Demand Global Ltd.

== History ==
The station launched on 9 November 2020, operated by the team behind a local music festival, Reminisce Festival. Presenters at launch included former Radio City personalities Lee Butler and Gemma Cutting, as well as ex-Juice FM and Capital Liverpool presenter Baz Todd. The station also featured syndicated programming from notable dance music DJs such as Tiësto, Dave Pearce, Judge Jules and Roger Sanchez.

In March 2021, former Radio City and Greatest Hits Radio presenter Rick Houghton joined the station to present a weekend show and assist with the development of new programming ideas.

== Programming ==
In Demand Radio broadcasts from studios at 40 Mill Lane, Wallasey. Other than some syndicated programming, its entire output is locally produced. In Demand Radio’s breakfast show is presented by Lee Butler, Claire Simmo and Gemma Cutting. The station features a number of competitions and traditionally gives away a car to a nominated local carer or charity worker during Christmas.

Notable presenters on the station include Ian Redman of dance music group Ultrabeat.

== In Demand Decades ==
In November 2024, the station launched a second stream of programming, In Demand Decades, carrying a classic hits format. This station broadcasts on the same DAB+ multiplex as the main In Demand Radio.

== Transmission ==
In Demand Radio and In Demand Decades both broadcast on the MuxCo Wrexham, Chester and Liverpool digital radio multiplex, covering over 800,000 households in the regions of North West England and North Wales. The station's signal reaches as far north as Blackpool and as far south as Stoke-on-Trent, with much of Manchester also within coverage.

== Reminisce Festival ==
In Demand Radio is the official media partner of local music festival Reminisce Festival. The festival has been held every year since 2014 in Sherdley Park, St Helens. The station broadcasts live music from the festival's stages live on air.
