= Sutton, St Helens =

Location in England

Coordinates: 53.436°N 2.704°W

Sutton
- Sutton Manor Colliery (1909–91)

- Location within Merseyside
- Population: 12,003 (2011.Ward)
- Metropolitan borough: St Helens
- Metropolitan county: Merseyside
- Region: North West
- Country: England
- Sovereign state: United Kingdom
- Post town: ST. HELENS
- Postcode district: WA9
- Dialling code: 01744
- Police: Merseyside
- Fire: Merseyside
- Ambulance: North West
- UK Parliament: St Helens South and Whiston

Sutton is an area of St Helens, in Merseyside, England, and a ward of the metropolitan borough of the same name. The population of the ward taken at the 2011 census was 12,003.

Historically within Lancashire, it is one of the four townships along with Eccleston, Parr and Windle that formed the municipal borough of St Helens in 1868.

== History ==
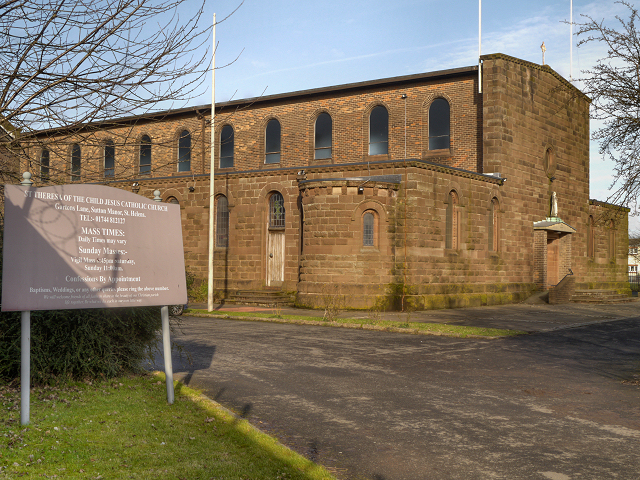
St Theresa of the Child Jesus church in Sutton Manor

The old Township of Sutton included: Sutton Village, Ditch Hillock, Peasley Cross, Marshalls Cross, Clock Face, Sutton Manor and Sherdley and totalled 3,752 acres. The exact derivation of Sutton is uncertain. It is thought the township took its name from 'Sudtun', old English for southern enclosure or south town and was likely to have been the southern portion of a Saxon thegn's estate. Before the Conquest of 1066 AD, Sutton was held by King Edward the Confessor and located within the Royal Forest of West Derby. This extended from Burtonwood to Crosby and in the 12th and 13th centuries, Sutton became part of the Barony of Widnes. Along with fourteen other townships including Windle, Parr and Eccleston, it became part of the large ecclesiastical parish of Prescot and its rich seams of coal, which were first discovered in Sutton Heath around 1540, transformed it from an area of moorland and forest into an area of mining.

Sutton was formerly a township and chapelry in the parish of Prescot, in 1866 Sutton became a separate civil parish, on 25 March 1894 the parish was abolished and merged with St Helens. In 1891 the parish had a population of 15,668.

== Transport ==
There are two railway stations in the area. St Helens Junction, and Lea Green both operate services to Liverpool and Manchester.

== Sutton Manor Colliery ==
Sutton Manor was one of the largest pits in the Lancashire Coalfield, the deepest of the two shafts going over 2,000 feet (610 m) into the earth. The first shaft was dug in 1906. They were filled in shortly after closure using large diameter limestone, around 30,000 tons from Holme Park Quarry in Carnforth then capped with three-metre thick reinforced concrete plugs over the two shafts, with venting pipes for methane.

== Landmarks ==
A 66-foot (20 m) tall sculpture, called Dream, is now sited at Sutton.

== People and culture ==
The popular St Helens Show or St Helens Festival as it had been rebranded in its final years, took place in Sutton each July at Sherdley Park, adjacent to The Sutton Academy. The three-day St Helens Centenary Festival was held in the park in 1968. It marked a hundred years since the town became a borough and was then the largest event ever held in St Helens. The festival went so well that it was decided to hold a similar event each year. This was called the St Helens Show and was renowned as the largest free show in Europe. From 2007 to 2010 it was reinvented as the two-day St Helens Festival before being axed by St Helens Council.

== See also ==
- St Nicholas' Church, St Helens
- Sutton Mill Dam
