= Sutton Mill Dam =

Nature park in Merseyside, England

Coordinates: 53.426°N 2.7170°W

The Sutton Mill Dam in Sutton, St Helens, England

The Sutton Mill Dam is a wildlife nature park and area of open water located in Sutton in the south of St Helens in Merseyside, England. Sandwiched between Clock Face Road, Leach Lane, and Mill Lane, it measures 360 metres in length with a waterfall at its eastern end. The lake is formed from the Sutton Brook, which flows through Sutton from Chester Lane to Jackson Street and ultimately into the St Helens Canal.

In 1976, local residents formed the Sutton Mill Dam Action Group to campaign against plans to allow the site to become a dumping ground for industrial waste. As a result of the local community's efforts, the site was officially opened as a wildlife park in 1987 with natural recovery encouraged as opposed to artificial landscaping.

The success of the project was recognised on 24 May 1988, when Prince Charles visited Sutton Mill Dam with a crowd of 200 onlookers.

The Sutton Mill Dam is one of the most popular angling locations in St Helens containing roach, bream, gudgeon and carp and the East Sutton Angling Club hosted summer contests for young anglers.

Sutton Mill Dam is owned by St Helens Council and a copy of the register of title can be obtained from HM Land Registry under title number MS184549.
