= St Helens Corporation Tramways =

Tramway operator in England

Operation
- Locale: St Helens
- Open: 1 April 1897
- Close: 31 March 1936
- Status: Closed

Infrastructure
- Track gauge: 1,435 mm (4 ft 8 1/2 in)
- Propulsion system: Electric

Statistics
- Route length: 21.96 miles (35.34 km)

New St Helens and District Tramways and St Helens Corporation Tramways operated a tramway service in St Helens between 1897 and 1936.

== History ==
St Helens Corporation took over the St Helens and District Tramways Company on 1 April 1897. The operation of the tramway was leased back to the former company.

=== New St Helens and District Tramways ===
On 4 November 1898 the operating company changed its name to the New St Helens and District Tramways.

The corporation undertook a modernisation and electrification programme and the first electric services started on 20 July 1899.

In 1902 extensions to the system included connections with the South Lancashire Tramways system at Haydock. and the Liverpool and Prescot Light Railway, at Brooks Bridge.

=== St Helens Corporation Tramways ===
The corporation took over operation of the services on 1 October 1919.

== Closure ==
The tramway closed on 31 March 1936.

== See also ==
- St Helens power station
