= Listed buildings in Bold, St Helens =

Bold is a civil parish in St Helens, Merseyside, England. It contains six buildings that are recorded in the National Heritage List for England as designated listed buildings, all of which are listed at Grade II. This grade is the lowest of the three gradings given to listed buildings and is applied to "buildings of national importance and special interest".

The parish is rural. It contained the country houses of Bold Old Hall and Bold Hall, on different sites, both of which have been demolished. All the listed buildings were associated with these houses, and consist of a farmhouse, stables, a walled garden, a bridge over a moat, and a pair of gate piers.

Name and location	Photograph	Date	Notes
Bridge, Bold Old Hall; 53.40774°N 2.69023°W	—	Early 18th century	The bridge crosses a former moat. It was designed by Giacomo Leoni, it is in stone, and consists of a simple single arch.
Gate piers, Bold Old Hall; 53.40783°N 2.69069°W	—	Early 18th century	The stone gate piers were designed by Giacomo Leoni. They are rusticated, with recessed corners and projecting cornices.
Farmhouse, Bold Hall; 53.41814°N 2.68830°W	—	Early to mid 18th century	Designed by Giacomo Leoni, the house is in brick with sandstone dressings, and has a hipped roof. It has two storeys and a symmetrical three-bay front. The house has a rectangular plan, with a later single-storey rear wing. In the centre of the front are paired entrances, and at the rear of the house is a projecting central bay with a pediment.
Stables, Bold Hall; 53.41828°N 2.68800°W	—	Early to mid 18th century	The former stables were designed by Giacomo Leoni. The east front is in sandstone, and the rest is in brick with stone dressings; the roof is slated. The building has a linear plan, is in a single storey, and has a symmetrical front of eight bays. The central entrance is in three bays, with Doric pilasters, and a pediment. The windows are sashes.
Bold Bridge; 53.39972°N 2.71804°W		1832	The bridge was designed by Charles Blacker Vignoles, and was built to carry the Liverpool to Warrington turnpike (later the A57 road) over the now closed St Helens and Runcorn Gap Railway. It is in stone, and consists of five arches. The central arch is the largest, it is skewed and spans the former railway line; the other smaller arches have been blocked. The arches all have banded rustication, impost bands, shaped voussoirs, and prominent keystones. There is a low parapet with rounded copings, and panelled pedestals.
Walled garden, Bold Hall; 53.41895°N 2.68881°W	—	c. 1844	The walls encircle a rectangular enclosure. They are in brick, with sandstone copings, gate surrounds, and lintels. The main entrance is an archway on the south side; it has rusticated quoins and voussoirs.
