= The Sutton Academy =

School in St. Helens, Merseyside, England

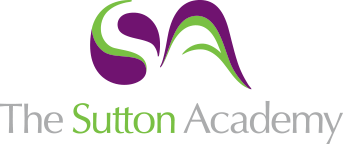

Location
- Elton Head Road; St. Helens, Merseyside, WA9 5AU; England
- Coordinates: 53.4284°N 2.7290°W

Information
- Type: Secondary / Academy
- Motto: Together Students Achieve
- Local authority: St. Helens
- Specialist: Previously: Sports College
- Department for Education URN: 136141 Tables
- Ofsted: Reports
- Chair of Governors' and Trustee: Peter Winter
- Principal: Paul Willerton
- Staff: 149
- Gender: Mixed
- Age: 11 to 18
- Enrolment: 1244
- Colours: Purple, green and black
- Website: https://thesuttonacademy.org.uk

The Sutton Academy (formerly Sutton High Sports College and originally known as Sutton High School) is a secondary school in the Sutton area of St. Helens, Merseyside, England. It is a medium-sized school for about 1300 students, catering to children from ages 11 to 18.

== History ==
The Sutton Academy was originally opened as a replacement for the much older Robins Lane High School. The Robins Lane site remained in use up until its demolition. The bell from the old facility can be seen on display inside the current Sutton Academy site. On the 10th of March 1992 there was a fire at the school, which destroyed several parts of the building. Ten years after this event, the school achieved its specialist status in sports in 2002. After becoming an academy in 2010, The Sutton Academy's facilities were slated to be extensively refurbished as part of the government's Building Schools for the Future scheme until the scheme was axed.
