= St Helens power station =

Power station in Merseyside, England

- Country: England
- Location: St Helens, Merseyside
- Coordinates: 53°27′02″N 02°44′54″W
- Status: Decommissioned
- Construction began: 1894
- Commission date: 1896
- Decommission date: 1960s
- Owners: St Helens Corporation (1894–1948); British Electricity Authority (1948–1955); Central Electricity Authority (1955–1957); Central Electricity Generating Board (1958–1970)
- Operator: As owner

Thermal power station
- Primary fuel: Coal
- Secondary fuel: Fuel Oil
- Turbine technology: Steam turbines
- Cooling towers: 6
- Cooling source: Circulating water

Power generation
- Units operational: 1 x 5 MW, 1 x 6.5 MW, 1 x 12.5 MW
- Make and model: Oerlikon, Brush Ljungstrom, Metropolitan Vickers
- Nameplate capacity: 24 MW
- Annual net output: 35,491 MWh (1946)

St Helens power station supplied electricity to the Borough of St Helens and the surrounding area from 1896 to the late 1960s. The power station was developed by the St Helens Corporation which operated it up to the nationalisation of the British electricity supply industry in 1948. It was redeveloped several times to meet the increased demand for electricity.

== History ==
St Helens Corporation applied in 1894 for a provisional order under the Electric Lighting Acts to generate and supply electricity to Borough of St Helens. The St. Helens Corporation Electric Lighting Order 1894 was granted by the Board of Trade and was confirmed by Parliament through the Electric Lighting Orders Confirmation (No. 1) Act 1894 (57 & 58 Vict. c. xlix). A power station was built in Warrington Road, St Helens and was commissioned in October 1896. The corporation charged 6d./kWh and attracted just 63 customers in its first year of operation.

In 1897 the corporation assumed control of St Helens Tramways which it intended to redevelop using electric traction instead of steam power. The corporation applied for a further provisional order in 1900. This was granted and confirmed by Parliament through the Electric Lighting Orders Confirmation (No. 5) Act 1900 (63 & 64 Vict. c. xlix). A new power station built at Croppers Hill, St Helens (53°27′02″N 2°44′54″W).

The generating station was extended with new plant as demand for electricity grew. In 1911 a 1,500 kW turbo-alternator and condenser were installed costing £5,000. In 1912 a 2,000 kW 6 kW turbo-alternator and associated boilers were installed.

During the general strike in 1926 the local civil commissioners overruled the Labour administration of St Helen Council and allowed staff to continue to run the power station against the council's wishes.

The tram system was decommissioned on 31 March 1936.

The British electricity supply industry was nationalised in 1948 under the provisions of the Electricity Act 1947 (10 & 11 Geo. 6. c. 54). The St Helens electricity undertaking was abolished, ownership of St Helens power station was vested in the British Electricity Authority, and subsequently the Central Electricity Authority and the Central Electricity Generating Board (CEGB). At the same time the electricity distribution and sales responsibilities of the St Helens electricity undertaking were transferred to the Merseyside and North Wales Electricity Board (MANWEB).

Following nationalisation St Helens power station became part of the St Helens electricity supply district.

The power station was converted to oil firing in 1963.

St Helens power station was closed in the late 1960s.

== Equipment specification ==
The plant in the original power station in Warrington Old Road was commissioned in December 1896 and was rated at 145 kW and comprised Robey horizontal engines coupled directly to alternators. This station was closed in December 1899

A new station was opened at Crockers Hill in July 1899 with 680 kW of plant. It was extended on several times

- 1 × 1,000 kW steam turbo-alternator alternating current (AC) (1911)
- 1 × 2,000 kW Dick, Kerr and Company steam turbo-alternator AC (1912)
- 1 × 3,000 kW steam turbo-alternator AC (1917)
- 1 × 5,000 kW steam turbo-alternator AC (1922)
- 1 x 6,500 kW steam turbo-alternator AC (1926)
- 1 x 12,500 kW steam turbo-alternator AC (1931)

and

- 1 × 200 kW reciprocating engine with direct current (DC) generator
- 2 × 300 kW reciprocating engines with DC generators

The following electricity supplies were available to consumers:

- 400 & 230 Volts, 3-phase, 50 Hz AC
- 460 & 230 Volts, DC
- 500 Volts DC, traction current

=== Plant in 1954 ===
By 1954 the plant comprised:

- Boilers:
  - 5 × Babcock & Wilcox 38,000 lb/h (4.79 kg/s) chain grate stoker boilers (total evaporative capacity 190,000 lb/h (23.9 kg/s)), steam conditions were 265 psi and 750°F (18.3 bar and 399°C), steam was supplied to:
- Generators:
  - 1 × 5.0 MW Oerlikon turbo-alternator
  - 1 × 6.5 MW Brush Ljungstrom turbo-alternator
  - 1 × 12.5 MW Metropolitan Vickers turbo-alternator

The total generating capacity was 24 MW at 6.6 kV.

Condenser water was cooled in six wooden cooling towers with a total capacity of 1.11 million gallons per hour (1.40 m^{3}/s).

== Operations ==
=== Operating data 1921–23 ===
The electricity supply data for the period 1921–23 was:

St Helens power station supply data 1921–23
Electricity Use	Units	Year		
Electricity Use	Units	1921	1922	1923
Lighting and domestic	MWh	503	584	717
Public lighting	MWh	44	43	40
Traction	MWh	1,413	1,395	1,559
Power	MWh	19,537	11,166	16,820
Bulk supply	MWh	0	0	0
Total use	MWh	21,497	13,188	19,136

Electricity Loads on the system were:

Year		1921	1922	1923
Maximum load	kW	5,713	4,382	5,400
Total connections	kW	8,936	10,192	11,298
Load factor	Per cent	51.2	43.1	48.9

Revenue from the sale of current (in 1923) was £76,375; the surplus of revenue over expenses was £30,894.

=== Operating data 1946 ===
In 1946 St Helens power station supplied 35,491 MWh of electricity; the maximum output load was 19,486 kW. The load factor was 20.8 %, and the thermal efficiency was 14.13 %.

=== Operating data 1954–67 ===
Operating data for the period 1954–67 was:

St Helens power station operating data, 1954–67
Year	Running hours or load factor (per cent)	Max output capacity MW	Electricity supplied MWh	Thermal efficiency per cent
1954	4095	16	34,169	12.98
1955	3129	16	21,744	11.73
1956	3842	16	24,724	12.85
1957	4263	16	28,073	13.48
1958	1288	16	9,829	12.85
1961	1.8 %	16	2,527	10.51
1962	2.0 %	16	2,811	8.92
1963	4.34 %	16	6,080	13.17
1967	4.2 %	16	5,922	10.43

== St Helens Electricity District ==
Following nationalisation in 1948 St Helens power station became part of the St Helens electricity supply district, covering 36 square miles (93.2 km^{2}) with a population of 131,000 in 1958. The number of consumers and electricity sold in the St Helens district was:

Year	1957	1958
Number of consumers	36,422	37,079
Electricity sold MWh	380,362	414,369

In 1958 the number of units sold to categories of consumers was:

Type of consumer	No. of consumers	Electricity sold MWh
Domestic	34,234	53,351
Shops and Offices	2,378	15,677
Factories	187	339,77
Farms	274	1,525
Traction	1	1,893
Public lighting	5	2,151
Total	37,079	414,369

The maximum demand on the system was 93,000 kW, the load factor was 50.9 %.

== See also ==
- Timeline of the UK electricity supply industry
- List of power stations in England
- St Helens Corporation Tramways
- Bold power station
