= Hope Academy =

Location
- Ashton Road; Newton-le-Willows, Merseyside, WA12 0AQ; England
- 53.46254°N 2.62404°W

Information
- Type: Academy
- Religious affiliation: Church of England/Roman Catholic
- Department for Education URN: 136421 Tables
- Ofsted: Reports
- Gender: Mixed-sex education
- Age: 11 to 16
- Website: www.hopeacademy.org.uk

Hope Academy is a coeducational secondary school with academy status located in Newton-le-Willows in the English county of Merseyside.

== History ==
=== St Aelred's Catholic Technology College ===
St Aelred’s Catholic Technology College was established in 1964. It was both a Voluntary aided school and coeducational from its inception and specialised in Technology. It was located on Birley Street. The college closed in 2011.

=== Newton-le-Willows Community High School ===
Newton-Le-Willows High School was a community school administered by St Helens Metropolitan Borough Council with around 900 pupils.

The two schools merged in September 2011 as Hope Academy, now a joint-faith school sponsored by Liverpool Hope University, the Anglican Diocese of Liverpool and the Roman Catholic Archdiocese of Liverpool.

The academy is built on the site of the playing fields on Newton-Le-Willows Community High School, with the existing school later demolished once the academy opened, and the new academy's playing field constructed on the site of the old school. The St Aelred's site has since been bought by a developer and around 200 dwellings has erected on half of the land, with the other portion being used as a football field.

== Curriculum ==
Hope Academy offers GCSEs and BTECs as programmes of study for pupils.

== Alumni ==
=== St Aelred's Catholic High School ===
- Andy Burnham (b. 1970) - Labour Party leader and Prime Minister of the United Kingdom. Former mayor of Greater Manchester.
