= Sherdley Park =

Urban Park in St Helens, United Kingdom

Coordinates: 53.434°N 2.732°W

- Interactive map of Sherdley Park
- Type: Municipal
- Location: St Helens, Merseyside
- Area: 136 hectares (340 acres)
- Status: Open all year

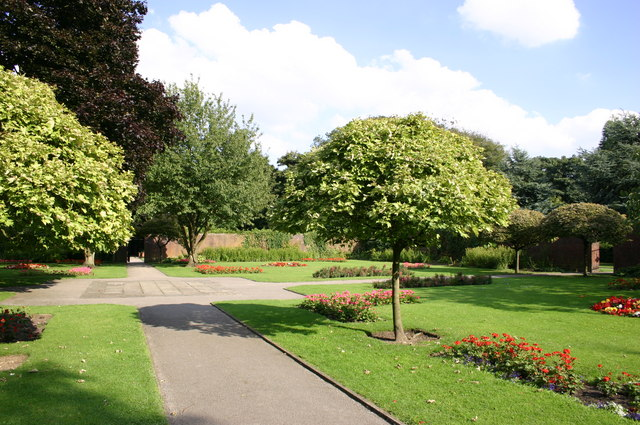
The gardens

Sherdley Park is a 336 acre (136 ha) urban park in Sutton, St Helens, Merseyside.

== History ==
In the 19th century it was owned by coal and copper baron, Michael Hughes, who also built the now demolished Sherdley Hall. The estate was purchased by the local authority after the second world war as a place of relaxation for the citizens of Sutton. Between 1965 and 2017 the park used to feature a pets corner but this has since closed and the site of the petting zoo has subsequently since been returned to parkland.

== Facilities ==
Sherdley Park is the largest park in the town. It includes an 18-hole golf course, a formal garden, open woodland, a lake and summer events. It is well known in the local area for hosting the St Helens Show which, in its heyday, was the largest free show in Europe. After many years of inactivity Sherdley Park began hosting the Sherdley Festival, a large annual three-day event of music from various genres.
