= Clock Face, St Helens =

Coordinates: 53.41554°N 2.7098°W

Clock Face
- Village
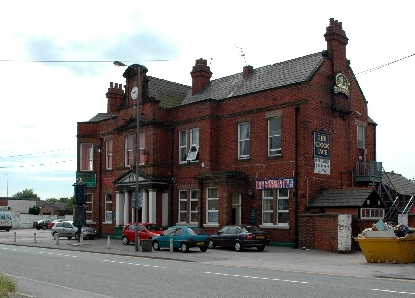
- The Clock Face pub

- Location within Merseyside
- OS grid reference: SJ529912
- Metropolitan borough: St Helens
- Metropolitan county: Merseyside
- Region: North West
- Country: England
- Sovereign state: United Kingdom
- Post town: St. Helens
- Postcode district: WA9
- Dialling code: 01744
- Police: Merseyside
- Fire: Merseyside
- Ambulance: North West
- UK Parliament: St Helens South and Whiston

Clock Face is a village and area of the town of St Helens, England, 4 mi (6.4 km) south of the town centre. It is in the Metropolitan Borough of St Helens and the parish of Bold.

Historically a part of Lancashire, the village and area is so named because of a large clock face that adorned the Inn. The name was also adopted by a colliery in the area. The Clock Face pub, although not the original building, is built close to the original location and maintains the naming tradition.

== Sport ==
Clock Face is home to the amateur rugby league side Clock Face Miners, originally established in 1921 as 'Clock Face Rangers'. The club colours are yellow and blue.

== Industry ==
The area was an important coal mining village with three collieries in the vicinity, including Clock Face Colliery (which was closed in 1966), Sutton Manor Colliery (which was closed in 1991), and Parkside Colliery, which was closed in 1992, following a lengthy NUM-linked sit-in protest, as the last deep mine in the Lancashire Coalfield.

Clock Face Country Park is situated on the site of one of the former collieries. In the late 1990s, the 57-acre (230,000 m^{2}) site was reclaimed by St Helens Council as a public open space. It contains developing woodlands, meadow areas and a fishing pond leased to a local angling club. The former mineral railway route has been reclaimed as a pathway to Sutton Manor Woodlands.

== Transport ==
Clock Face was once served by the St Helens and Runcorn Gap Railway at Clock Face station on Gartons Lane. The area is currently served by Lea Green railway station on the northern route of the Liverpool to Manchester Line. Arriva North West operate bus services in Clock Face, routes 32/32A, 30 and 33 link the area to St Helens Hospital and the Town Centre. Other bus companies serving the area include Merseytravel's 140 bus route and Halton Transport's 17/17B bus routes. Arriva have since taken over some 17 bus routes to Widnes as part of a scheme to boost travel between both Widnes and St Helens.
