= St Helens, Merseyside =

Town in Merseyside, England

Coordinates: 53°27′15″N 02°44′10″W

St Helens
- Town
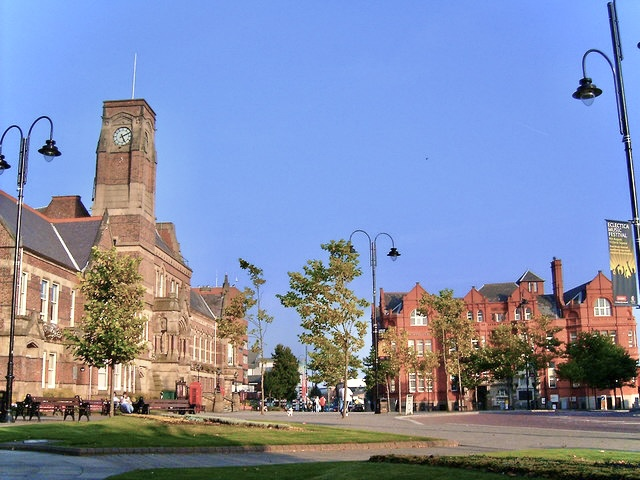
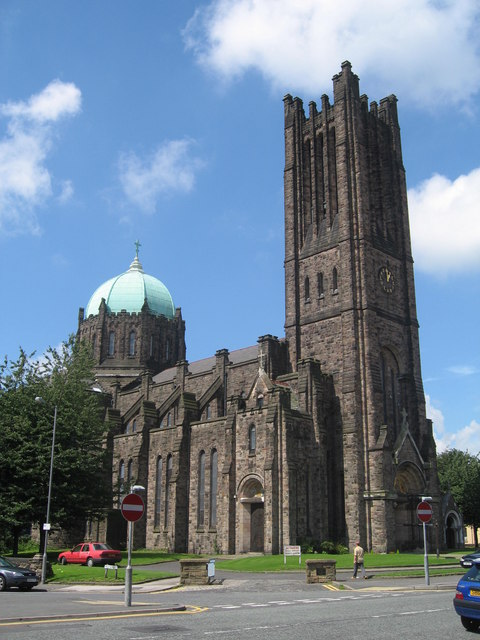
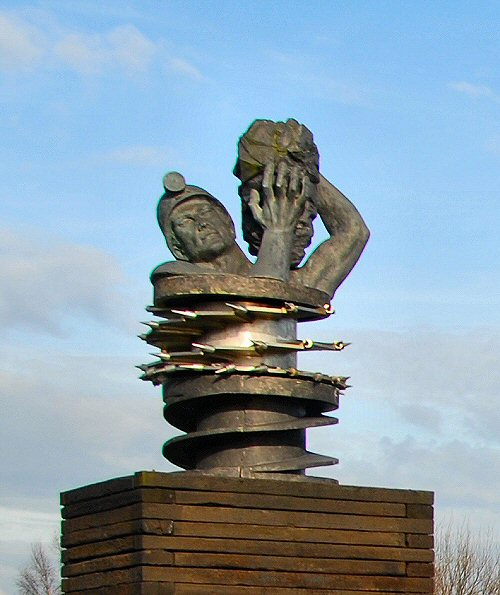
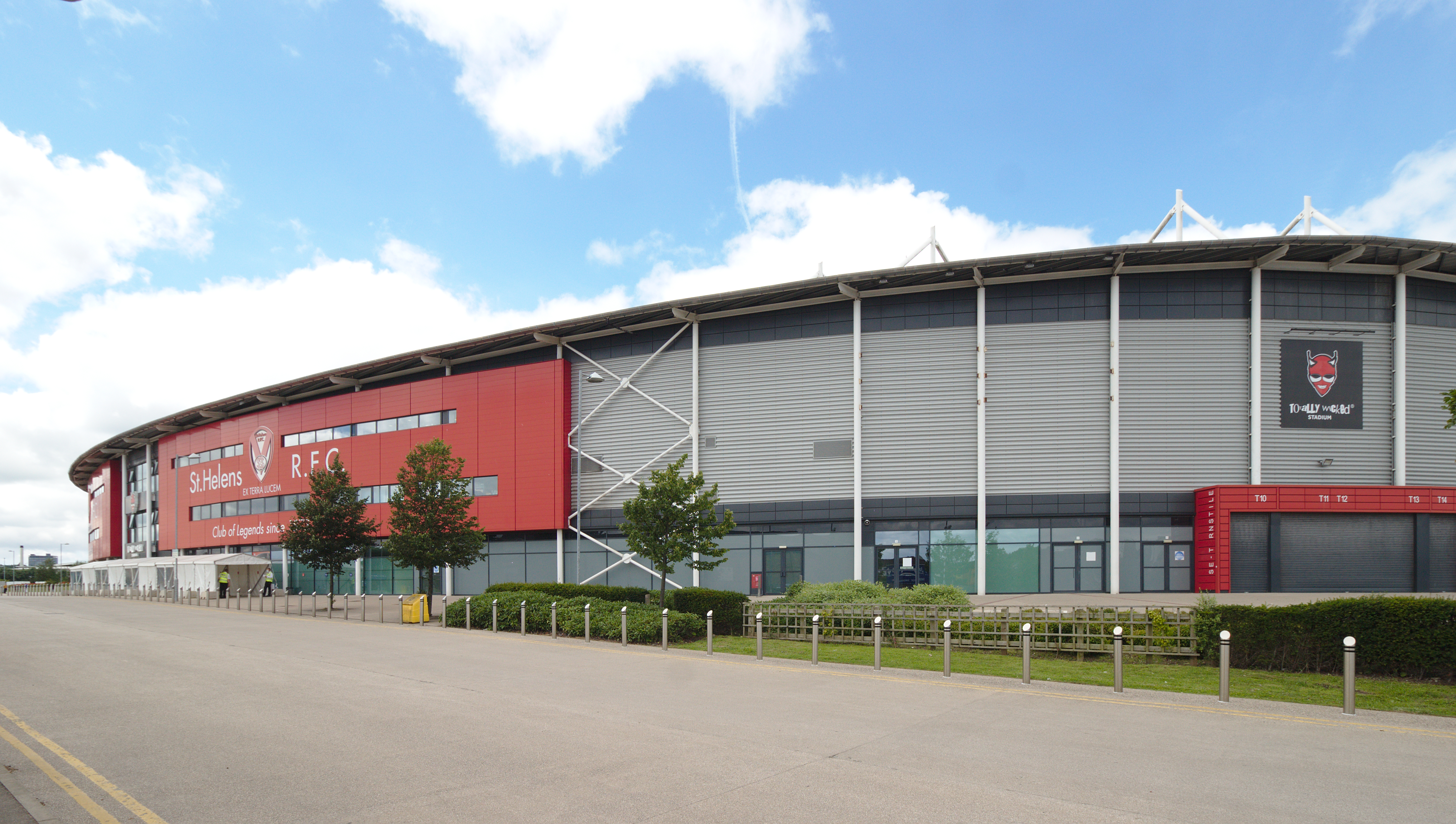
- A montage of Victoria Square with the town hall and Gamble Institute; St Mary's Lowe House Catholic Church; the Anderton Shearer Monument and, at the bottom, the BrewDog stadium

- Location within Merseyside
- Population: 117,308 (2021 Census)
- OS grid reference: SJ505955
  - London: 174 mi (280 km) SE
- Metropolitan borough: St Helens
- Metropolitan county: Merseyside
- Region: North West
- Country: England
- Sovereign state: United Kingdom
- Districts of the town: Blackbrook, Clock Face, Eccleston, Haydock, Parr, Ravenhead, Sutton, Thatto Heath, Windle, Billinge
- Post town: ST. HELENS
- Postcode district: WA9, WA10, WA11
- Dialling code: 01744
- Police: Merseyside
- Fire: Merseyside
- Ambulance: North West
- UK Parliament: St Helens North; St Helens South and Whiston

St Helens is a large town in Merseyside, England, with a population of 117,308. It is the administrative centre of the Metropolitan Borough of St Helens which had a population of 183,200 at the 2021 Census.

The town is 6 miles (10 kilometres) north of the River Mersey, in the south-west part of historic Lancashire. The town was initially a small settlement within the historic county's ancient hundred of West Derby in the township of Windle but by the mid-1700s the town had developed into a larger urban area beyond the townships borders. By 1838 the council was formally made responsible for the administration of Windle and the three other townships of Eccleston, Parr and Sutton that were to form the town's traditional shape. In 1868 the town was incorporated as a municipal borough, then later became a county borough in 1887. In 1974 the town was made a metropolitan borough within the new Metropolitan County of Merseyside by the Local Government Act 1972, with an expanded administrative responsibility for several nearby towns and villages.

The town was famous for its heavy industry, particularly its role in the coal mining industry, glassmaking, chemicals and copper smelting and sail making that drove its growth throughout the Industrial Revolution. Originally home to a large number of industrial employers such as Beechams, the Gamble Alkali Works, Ravenhead Glass, United Glass Bottles (UGB), Triplex, Daglish Foundry, Greenall's brewery, the glass producer Pilkington is the town's only remaining large industrial employer.

The town is today most famous for its Rugby League team St Helens R.F.C. who have won 3 World Club Challenge cups in recent years, and museums such as the North West Museum of Road Transport, the World of Glass and art installations such as Dream.

== History ==
=== Pre-history ===
The southern part of what became the traditional county of Lancashire was at least partially settled by the Brigantes, a Celtic tribe, who were subjugated by the Romans during their 1st Century conquest, with nearby Wigan suggested as a location for the Roman settlement of Coccium. Eccleston in St Helens appears to derive its name from either the Latin ecclesia or the Brittonic eglwys, both meaning "church", suggesting a common link to a place of worship although none is known in that township until the 19th century.

The first recorded settlements are the Manors, Parishes and Titled Lands listed in the Domesday Book in the 11th century. The titled lands would have encompassed the modern townships of Sutton, Windle and Parr as part of their fiefdoms, though it may be inferred from the listed tithes that the land was populated before then.

=== Formation ===
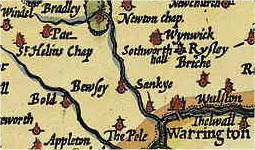
"St Helins" Chapel as recorded on a map of 1610

Windle Chantry dates back to the 15th Century, with Sir Thomas Gerard responsible for its construction on his return from Agincourt around 1415.

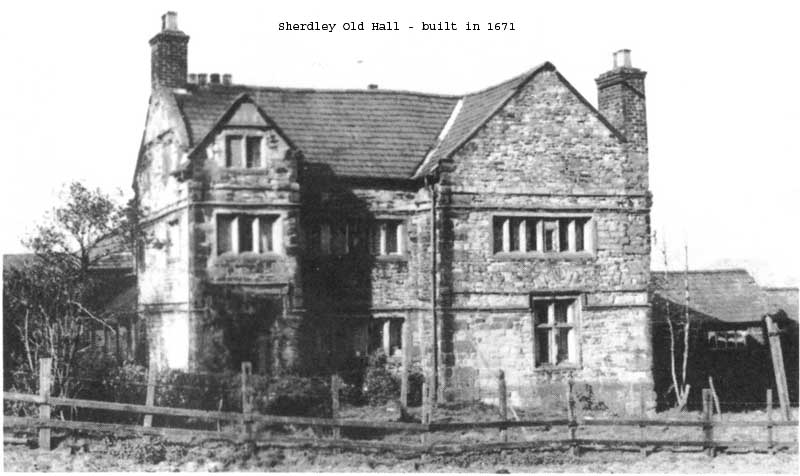
The Sherdley Old Hall farmhouse, built in 1671 in the Elizabethan style, a Grade II listed building

"St Hellens" as recorded in 1818 OS

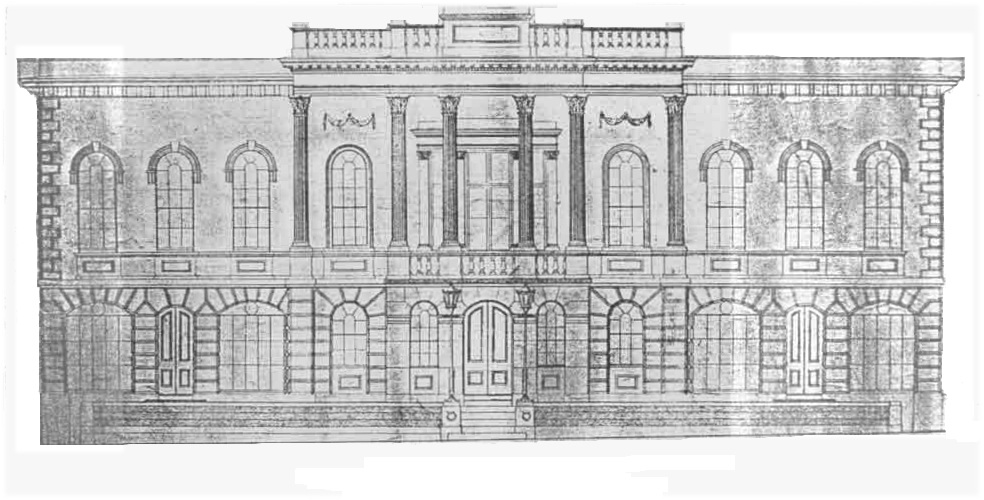
A contemporary sketch of the original Town Hall, built 1839

A photograph believed to be of the improvement commissioners offices built in 1852

St Helens did not exist as a town in its own right until as late as the middle of the 18th century when it is referenced in Parliament. The development of the town has a complex history: it was spurred on by the rapid population growth in the region during the Industrial Revolution. Between 1629 and 1839, St Helens grew from a small collection of houses surrounding an old chapel, to a village, before becoming the significant urban centre of the four primary manors and surrounding townships that make up the modern town.

The Domesday Book of 1086 reveals that several manors existed at that time, although there are no specific references to "St Elyn", or mentions of the particular "vill" or villages. Windle is first recorded on some maps as "Windhull" (or variations thereof) in 1201, Bold in 1212 (as Bolde) and Parr (or Parre) in 1246, whilst Sutton and Ecclestone composed part of the Widnes "fee" (a hereditary entitlement of ownership) under a Knight or Earl. It is known that the Hospitallers held lands in the area of Hardshaw as early as 1292, known as Crossgate (which may be referred to by the long built-over Cross Street in the town centre beneath the modern College campus) and many of the original parishes, townships and local areas are named after the families that owned the land between the 11th and 18th centuries.

The Ecclestone family owned the Eccleston township. Their ancestral home dates to 1100; it was built by Hugh Ecclestone. The family is referred to throughout the period until the 18th century when they departed for nearby Southport.

The manor of Parr remained in control of the Parr family and their descendants from the 13th to the early 15th century when a distant relative of the original family line, William Parr, 1st Marquess of Northampton (brother of Henry VIII's wife Catherine Parr) sold the manor to the Byroms of Lowton. The family later supported the Royalists during the English Civil War, and Henry Byrom (son of the Lord of the Manor) died at the Battle of Edgehill.

The extensive lands of Sutton Manor stretched across the open and flat land leading towards the Mersey. The manor's name is of unknown origin, but the land within the estate referred to several leading families, including Eltonhead, Ravenhead, and Sherdley. In 1212, William de Daresbury was the title holder of the manors. The Sherdley family can be traced back to the Northales, who had been settled in the area since at least 1276 when they were referred to as plaintiffs in a boundary dispute with the Lords of Rainhill.

Windle contained the smaller Hardshaw, described as a berewick in the Domesday Book. It was in Hardshaw that Chapel Lane was constructed. The Windle Family were Lords of the Manor and Township from the Norman period onward before ceding control to the Gerards of Bryn.

"This tiny hamlet [in] Hardshaw including the chapel-of-ease, from which its name was taken, became the nucleus of the town."

— Mike Fletcher, Black Gold & Hot Sand, 2002

In 1139, the earldom of Derby, in the Peerage of England, was created: Norman descendant Robert De Ferrers was the first Earl. Subsequently, the region passed to John of Gaunt, and eventually the Stanley family. Their ancestral home was eventually established in the nearby Knowsley area (to the west of the modern St Helens borough), with the foundation of a hunting lodge in the 15th century and subsequently Knowsley Hall in the 18th century. The Earl of Derby's lands encompassed a region from Liverpool to Manchester, and to the north beyond Lancaster and were primarily turned to meeting the pastoral needs of the people.

Throughout this period, the area was predominantly arable land and was noted for its large swathes of moss, heath and bog land while elsewhere in parts, it was covered by the greater Mersey Forest (the larger "Community Forest" was not established until much later).

The origin of the name "St Helens" stretches back at least to a chapel of ease dedicated to St Elyn, the earliest documented reference to which is in 1552. The first time the chapel was formally referred to appears to be 1558, when Thomas Parr of Parr bequeathed a sum of money "to a stock towards finding a priest at St. Helen's Chapel in Hardshaw, and to the maintenance of God's divine service there for ever, if the stock go forward and that the priest do service as is aforesaid". Early maps show that it was originally in Chapel Lane, near the site of the modern pedestrianised Church Street. Historically this would have fallen within the berewick of Hardshaw, within the greater township of Windle (making up the southern border) abutting onto the open farmland of Parr to the east, and Sutton and Eccleston to the south and west respectively.

In 1552, the Chapel of St Elyn was noted as "consisting only of a challis and a lytle bell". The chapel was described as being at the crux of the four townships of Eccleston, Parr, Sutton and Windle, and lay on the intersecting roads that criss-crossed the area and linked Lancashire towns such as Liverpool, Ormskirk, Lathom and the Cheshire region south of the River Mersey. The transport link is attested to by the existence of Chester Lane (the modern B5419 is much foreshortened) that originally wound through the west of the town heading south to the Mersey crossing point of Warrington and beyond to the ancient Chester Road (that now makes up part of the modern A56) that stretched between the historic town of its name and the Manchester townships. The chapel also sat directly between the port town of Liverpool, and the landlocked Manchester townships that would become important in the development of the greater area of both St Helens and Wigan.

As a busy thoroughfare it is suggested by historian and genealogist William Farrer that a village existed in the vicinity for centuries, later sharing the name of the chapel. It is known from the diaries of a local Puritan by the name of Adam Martindale that by the time the King's Head Inn was constructed in 1629 on "the great road" (taken to refer to all or part of Chester Lane) between Warrington and Ormskirk, a number of houses, farms and manors counted amongst the properties in the local vicinity and general area. Martindale notes that by 1618 that the original chapel had been demolished and rebuilt in the same vicinity. In 1678 a building was converted for use as a meeting place for the Society of Friends by George Shaw of Bickerstaffe. Local historians believe the building had been used for another purpose long before 1678. The Quaker Friends' Meeting House, as it is now known, is a Grade II listed building.

The strong link to Roman Catholicism in the area was maintained throughout this period by the eventual Lords of Sutton Manor, the De Holland family, starting in 1321. Thomas Holland, a local Jesuit priest, was arrested and tried for high treason in October 1642 as "taking orders by authority of the see of Rome and returning to England". The first step toward his beatification was allowed by Pope Leo XIII in 1886. Conversely Roger Holland was burnt at the stake for heresy when he continued his professed belief in the Reformed churches some 100 years earlier in 1558 during the persecution of Mary I. It is suggested that Ravenhead Hall was the site of a Catholic chapel during the most severe of Catholic persecutions during the 17th and 18th centuries. Whilst the Lathom family maintained Rainfords close connections, as did the Ecclestons.

Less well-known is the Windle connection to witches. In 1602, two women were sent to Lancaster for trial, while a decade later Isobel Roby was submitted to Sir Thomas Gerard, accused of upsetting the ship upon which James VI and I's Queen Consort Anne of Denmark was arriving. Roby was finally executed at Lancaster, along with the Pendle and Salmesburg witches, on 20 August 1612.

By 1746, St Helens, composed of the greater area of the four townships (and their collieries) beyond Prescot, was referred to in a statement in Parliament related to the extension of the Liverpool to Prescot Turnpike.

The rapid growth of St Helens at the centre of the townships is attested to by several authors. The Penny Cyclopaedia states in 1839 that "Saint Helen's, Lancashire, is in the township of Windle, in the chapelry of St Helen's, Prescott parish. The township contains 3,540 acres (1,430 hectares), and had in 1831 a population of 5,825. The town has risen into importance of late years" In contrast by 1844 (30 years before the borough of St Helens was established) Cyrus Redding mentions a reversal of the roles: "St Helens, originally an inconsiderable village, is now a very thriving town"; and he later states that the town "... may be said to contain the four townships of Sutton, Parr, Windle and Eccleston". The composition of the town described by Redding largely mirrors those observations made by Samuel Lewis in 1848 and later still in 1874 by John Marius Wilson and John Bartholemew in 1887.

Census figures from 1801 suggest the population of the District Area of St Helens to be 12,500; by 1861 it was between 37,631 and 55,523 (John Marius Wilson gives the lower number, with total households at the specific figure of 6,539) in the wider area with St Helens itself comprising a population of 20,176 in 3,577 households. The Ordnance Survey map of 1843 shows St Helens as the significant urban centre

Saint Helens Improvement Act 1845
- Act of Parliament
- Parliament of the United Kingdom
- Long title: An Act for paving, lighting, cleansing, watering, regulating, and otherwise improving the Town of Saint Helens in the County Palatine of Lancaster, and for establishing and regulating a Market therein.
- Citation: 8 & 9 Vict. c. clxxvi

Dates
- Royal assent: 31 July 1845
Other legislation
Repealed by	Saint Helens Improvement Act 1851

Status: Repealed

Text of statute as originally enacted

Saint Helens Improvement Act 1851
- Act of Parliament
- Parliament of the United Kingdom
- Long title: An Act for amending and extending the Provisions of the Act for the Improvement of the Town of Saint Helen's in the County Palatine of Lancaster, and for other Purposes.
- Citation: 14 & 15 Vict. c. cxxxii

Dates
- Royal assent: 7 August 1851
Other legislation
Repealed by	Saint Helens Improvement Act 1855

Status: Repealed

Saint Helens Improvement Act 1855
- Act of Parliament
- Parliament of the United Kingdom
- Long title: An Act for the Improvement of the Town of Saint Helen's, and for other Purposes.
- Citation: 18 & 19 Vict. c. lxxiv

Dates
- Royal assent: 26 June 1855
Other legislation
Repealed by	St. Helens Improvement Act 1869

Text of statute as originally enacted

St. Helens Improvement Act 1869
- Act of Parliament
- Parliament of the United Kingdom
- Long title: An Act to dissolve the Local Boards of the districts of Sutton and Parr, in the borough of Saint Helens in the county of Lancaster, and to repeal the Saint Helens Improvement Act, 1855, and to constitute the Corporation of the said borough the Local Authority therein for the improving and governing of the said borough; to enable the said Corporation to extend their Waterworks and to purchase the undertakings of the Saint Helens Waterworks Company and the Saint Helens Gas Company; and for other purposes.
- Citation: 32 & 33 Vict. c. cxx

Dates
- Royal assent: 12 July 1869

Text of statute as originally enacted

The original Town Hall was constructed in 1839 and described by Wilson in 1874 as "in the Italian style, with a Corinthian portico; and contains a lock-up, a newsroom, and a large hall for courts, concerts, balls, and public meetings". It was not until 1852 that the Civil Parish of St Helens was instituted (noted in 1874 by Wilson as "more extensive than the town"). The Mill Street Barracks were completed in 1861.

On 2 February 1868, Queen Victoria granted a charter of incorporation, defining St Helens officially as a municipal borough. The first election of councillors took place on 9 May the same year, followed by the first town council meeting on 18 May. About 20 years later in 1887 St Helens became a County Borough, with two Members of Parliament.

St. Helens Corporation Act 1893
- Act of Parliament
- Parliament of the United Kingdom
- Long title: An Act to extend the boundaries of the borough of Saint Helens in the county of Lancaster to consolidate the townships within the borough to dissolve the Burial Board and to make better provision for the health local government and improvement of the borough and for other purposes.
- Citation: 56 & 57 Vict. c. ccxv

Dates
- Royal assent: 24 August 1893

Text of statute as originally enacted

In 1894, the Parish of St Helens was incorporated under the St. Helens Corporation Act 1893 (56 & 57 Vict. c. ccxv). This was achieved by the abolition of the Civil Parishes of Parr, Sutton and amalgamation of their townships. The civil parishes of Eccleston and Windle both ceded portions of their areas over to St Helens.

The modern Borough of St Helens includes areas historically not associated with the town. The 1974 creation of the Ceremonial County of Merseyside appended the former urban districts of Haydock, Newton-le-Willows and Rainford, and parts of Billinge-and-Winstanley and Ashton-in-Makerfield urban districts, along with part of Whiston Rural District, all from the administrative county of Lancashire. The urban sprawl of St Helens was already extended up to the boundary lines of places such as Haydock and Rainhill, where inhabitants may consider themselves either part of either both St Helens the 'Town' or 'Borough', or just the Borough.

=== Industrial development ===
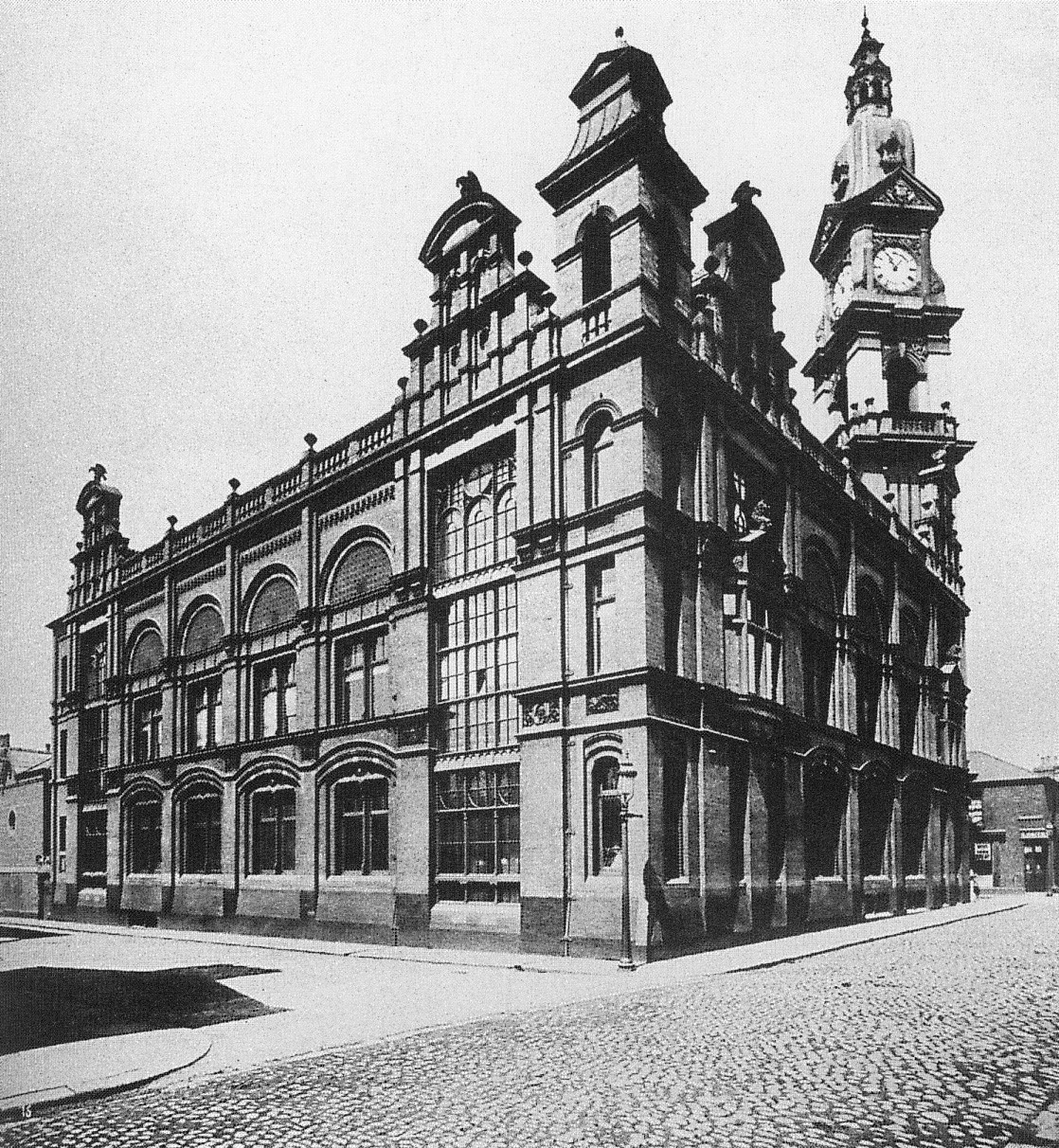
Beecham's Clock Tower built in 1877.

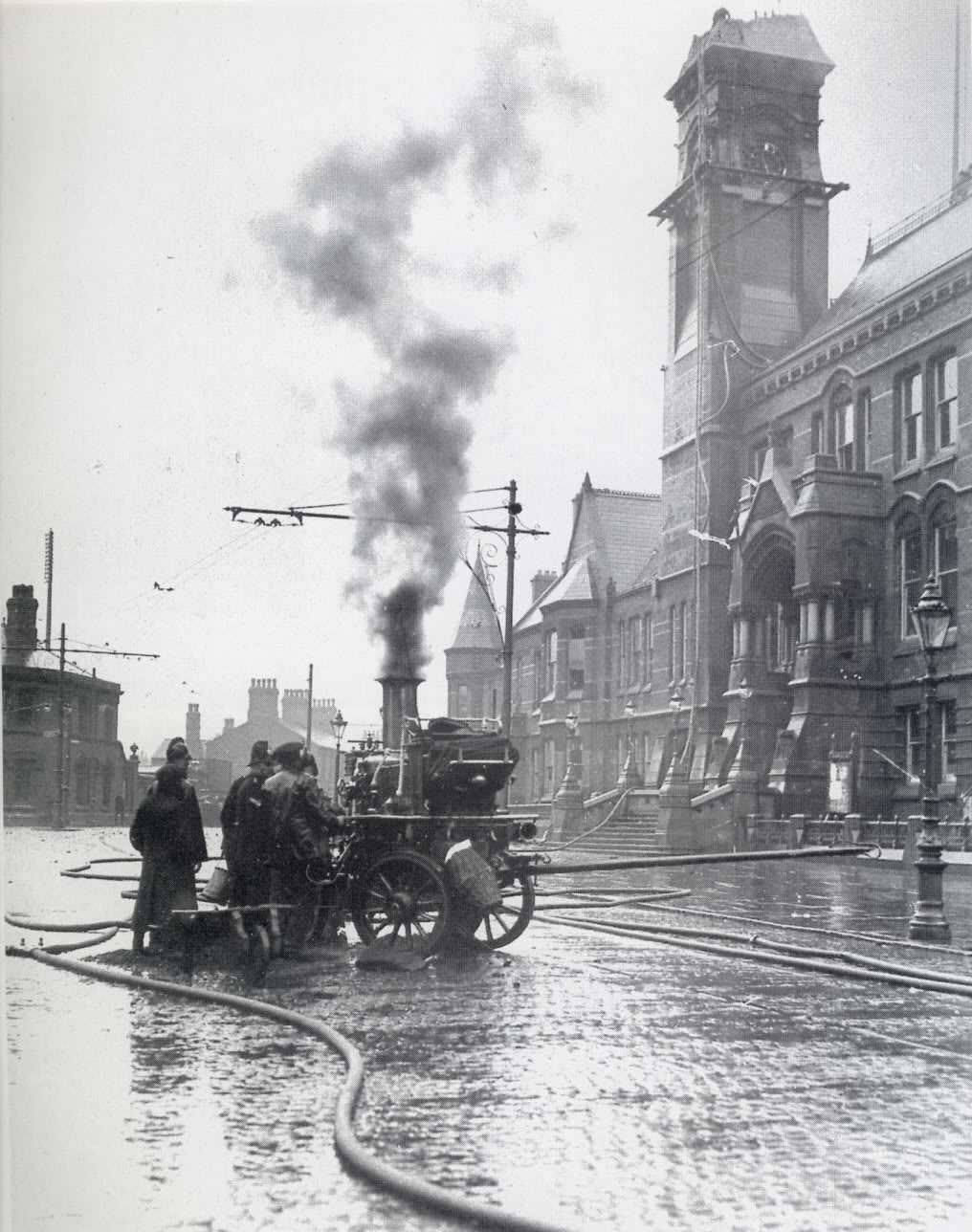
The Town Hall loses its steeple a second time, permanently, in 1913.

Until the mid-18th century, the local industry was almost entirely based on small-scale home-based initiatives such as linen weaving. The landscape was dotted with similarly small-scale excavation and mining operations, primarily for clay and peat, but also notably for coal. It is the coal to which the town owes both its initial growth and development and the subsequent development of the coal-dependent industries of copper smelting and glass.

Sitting on the South Lancashire Coalfield, the town was built both physically and metaphorically on coal; the original motto in the borough council's coat of arms was "Ex Terra Lucem" ("From the Ground, Light") and local collieries employed up to 5,000 men as late as the 1970s. During the boom years of the British coal industry (1913 was the peak year of production, with 1 million employed in UK mining industry) the St Helens division of the Lancashire and Cheshire Miners' Federation (the local miners' union) had the largest membership (10%) of that federation.

The discovery of winnable coal seams is mentioned in 1556, referred to as "Beds of cinders or coke ... have been discovered three feet thick" during the digging of a clay pit and is commonly attributed to the Eltonhead family (Elton Head Road, the modern B5204, shares the name of the family) whilst reference to the significant distribution of "potsherds" during excavation suggests that some light industry had been underway for some time before (perhaps as far back as the 13th century) and the clay and pottery industries lasted in the area through to the early 20th century. A dispute arose between the landlord Bolds and the tenant Eltonheads, eventually resulting in an agreement to compensate the Bold family.

The majority of the land had been turned over to arable farming since at least the 12th century, according to the historical family records of William De Daresbury. The township of Sutton was recorded as "by itself being assessed at four plough-lands". Plow or ploughlands are assessed at 120 acres (49 hectares) apiece. The pastoral use of the local land was common even in 1901, with William Farrer noting of Eccleston that the "country is of an undulating nature and principally dedicated to agriculture, fields of rich and fertile soil being predominant" and describing the produce as "chiefly potatoes, oats, and wheat on a clayey soil which alternates with peat". Even so, Farrer also notes that several old quarries and shafts still existed within the area while also making reference to a "brewery at Portico, and a pottery near Prescot, while glass, watchmakers' tools, and mineral waters are also manufactured".

Two hundred years earlier, Farrer may well have seen a different sight: St Helens was scarred and pitted by shallow mining operations, often quickly abandoned, left to flood and exceedingly prone to collapse. The primitive mining techniques, and limited ability to bail out gathering water, meant many pits had short lifespans. Complaints are recorded in Sutton Heath in particular about the plans to expand mining across the town, but the lure of a stable income ultimately won out against the objections. 100 years later, the Council rejected a planning application for an open cast mine — underlining the finality of the decline of coal mining in the area.

In the 18th century, however, coal was an enabling force for the town that opened up opportunities for further commercial and industrial developments, which in turn drove demand for the rapid movement of raw goods not simply out of the town (coal to Liverpool to fuel its shipping and steel works for instance, but also its salt works) but also in promoting an influx of raw products for processing. The dependence of St Helens on its transport links is evident from claims made to Parliament in 1746 for maintenance and extension of the turnpike road after local flooding had damaged it.

"because Prescot, being Three Miles nearer to Liverpoole than St Helens, Persons will naturally go to the former Place for Coals, if they can be supplied as well and as cheap there as at the latter"

— T.C. Barker quoting Witness John Eyes, Merseyside Town in the Industrial Revolution: St. Helens, 1750–1900

It is clear that St Helens' development owes as much to its location on the south Lancashire Coalfield as it does the fact that Liverpool, Chester and other centres of industry were not, and yearned for the fossil fuel of choice.

It was essential therefore for the town to maintain, and invest further in, transport links and promote itself as a hub for the growth of Liverpool, with its provision of raw materials benefiting from its location and promising transport links. Liverpool, recognising the need for a ready supply of coal for its forges, responded with a petition for the extension of the Liverpool to Prescot Turnpike. This soon developed into a far more forward thinking development which was at the heart of the Industrial Revolution: canals.

It was originally proposed merely to make the Sankey Brook navigable, but the eventual outcome was a complete man-made canal linking St Helens to the River Mersey and the city of Liverpool. The Sankey Canal was opened in 1757, and extended in 1775, to transport coal from the pits in Ravenhead, Haydock and Parr to Liverpool, and for raw materials to be shipped to St Helens.

The transport revolution centred on the region encouraged an influx of industry to the hitherto sparsely populated area. With industry came job opportunities and population growth. Between 1700 St Helens grew from a sparsely populated array of manor houses and their tenants into a sprawling span of mining operations.

Owing primarily to the abundance of coal reserves, the quality of local sand, and the availability of salt in nearby Cheshire, glass making is known to have been ongoing in the Sutton area since at least 1688, when the Frenchman John Leaf Snr is recorded as paying the Eltonhead family £50 for a lease of 2½ acres (1 hectare) of Sutton's Lower Hey. The glass industry got a significant lift with the Crown-authorised "British Cast Plate Glass Company" established in Ravenhead in 1786; it latched onto the success of similar enterprises to set the region as the market leader for glass.

The foundation of the companies owed as much to industrial leaders from outside the town (and the finance they provided) as to its natural resources but the synchronous development of the steam engine was a significant development, with James Watt's stationary steam engine design leading the way. Water could be pumped from deeper than ever before, and mines could be driven to find even more dense seams. At the same time, the growth in use of machinery (e.g. for mills, forges, and ships) rapidly increased the demand for coal - to which the town responded.

Land exchanged hands in St Helens rapidly, as established families moved out of the growing towns filled with the working classes to more gentrified and less industrially developed places. In their place came self-made wealthy industrialists such as John Mackay (who first leased land in St Helens in the 1760s from King George III before buying the land constituting Ravenhead Farm from the Archbishop of York), Michael Hughes, the Gambles, and later Thomas Beecham, Thomas Greenall and the Pilkingtons. A few established families remained, such as the Gerards of Windle Hall. They made their land available for industrial use.

"if any ... good colliers ... will apply at Thatto Heath Colliery, they will meet with constant employ and the best encouragement."

— Mike Fletcher quoting John Mackay, Black Gold & Hot Sand, 200

One of the first major industries to grow out of the transport innovations in the region was copper smelting. The Parys mining company, led by Michael Hughes, leased land from John Mackay close to the newly constructed Sankey Canal at Ravenhead (where Ravenhead Colliery had since been established). This allowed copper ore carried from the Parys Mountain mine in Amlwch in Anglesey, North Wales to arrive in the St Helens region via the Mersey directly at the point where coal was being excavated to fire the forges of industry. Some 10,000 tons of copper ore yielding over 1,300 tons of copper passed along this route. At the same time the Gerards were renting out land in Blackbrook to Patten & Co. from nearby Warrington. The company smelted using the Gerards' own coal, then moved the coal downstream from a private wharf on the navigable brook.

The boom did not last: by 1783, coal industry leaders such as Mackay, Sarah Clayton and Thomas Case were all dead, penniless or both as a global constriction on coal shipments stifled the industry. An over-reliance on shipping to the USA during the American War of Independence (1775–1783) ruined many people, and led to the permanent loss of several smaller industries. It took partnership and coordination with other industries for the mining industry to recover; with the US embargo lifted, the town's troubles were soon overcome if not forgotten, although this was not the last troubling incident.

The demand for chemicals such as alkali from the glass industry soon led the Gamble family to start their lime and alkali pits, saving on import costs. The growing demand for chemical processing also contributed heavily to the growth of Widnes.

The Liverpool and Manchester Railway opened in 1830. It passed through the southern edge of the town at Rainhill and St Helens Junction, and furthered its economic development as a centre of industry.

=== The decline of the mining industry ===
The last coal mine located close to the town centre (Ravenhead Colliery) and those located in the outlying districts of St Helens, including those that were just outside the original 1887 County Borough boundary, such as Clock Face (Clock Face Colliery), Sutton (Bold Colliery), Sutton Heath (Lea Green Colliery), Sutton Manor (Sutton Manor Colliery) and Haydock (Lyme Pit, Wood Pit, Old Boston), were all closed between the nationalisation of the deep coal mining industry in 1947 and 24 May 1991, when Sutton Manor Colliery, the last to go in the immediate St Helens area, finally closed its gates.

The coal mining industry in St Helens and elsewhere had collapsed because the government maintained that the deep mining of coal was no longer an economically viable proposition in most British coalfields. The closures were opposed by the National Union of Mineworkers during the year-long Miners' Strike of 1984–85. After the collapse of the miners' strike in March 1985, St Helens was just one of dozens of towns in the UK that was immediately set to lose a long-standing employer. In the case of both Sutton Manor and Bold Collieries, it was estimated by some that when they were closed they each still had up to 40 years of winnable coal reserves. The last colliery in the modern metropolitan borough, and in the St Helens area of the South Lancashire Coalfield, was Parkside, in Newton-le-Willows, which was closed in 1993.

== Economy ==
The glass industry is no longer the major employer it once was; however, it still employs over a thousand people in the town. The large Pilkington Brothers works, founded in 1826, dominates the town's industrial quarter and still produces all the UK's output of flat glass.

In 1994, planning permission was sought out for a link road connecting the M62 directly with the town centre. The development included a £5m retail and commercial property project in the Ravenhead area that had seen successive business closures with the folding of UGB and Ravenhead Glass.

=== Retail ===
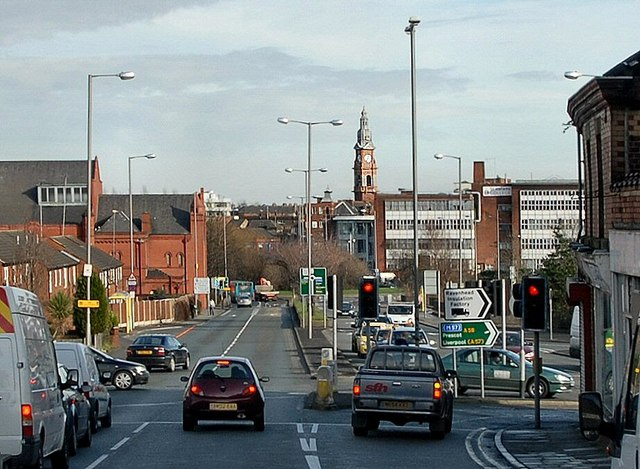
The view into the Town Centre, with Beechams Clock Tower in view.

The town's shopping area is centred on the St Helens Minster, the original site of St Mary's open market. The open market was later replaced by an awned covered market that populated Chapel Lane and the locale.

The current Church Square shopping centre surrounds St Helens on three sides. Church Street, the main high street, runs parallel to Church Square and is sandwiched by the town's second shopping centre known as The Hardshaw Centre. The other main shopping streets in the town centre include the more traditional small store based Bridge Street, Duke Street and Westfield Street populated by independent specialists. Church Square was bought by St Helens Borough Council in 2017 for £26.6m as part of local regeneration plans.

The Hardshaw Centre closed in August 2024 after its remaining retailers were relocated to Church Square Shopping Centre.

The town centre has several supermarkets including mainstream stores such as Asda and Tesco, as well as smaller stores such as Lidl. Morrisons retain two stores located in the Eccleston and Sutton areas of the town. There is also a Tesco superstore in Earlestown, which is on a former Safeway site and many smaller Tesco Express and Tesco Metro stores. A new Tesco Extra store opened in October 2011 on the outskirts of the town centre to replace the existing Chalon Way superstore, which has now been taken over by new retail Home & Leisure outlet, The Range.

St Helens has two major retail parks, one on either side of the St Helens Linkway. The older of these, St Helens Retail Park, is home to several discount stores and wholesale retailers.

The larger Ravenhead Retail Park houses more large-scale mainstream retail stores, and a number of restaurants, fast food outlets and cafes. Opening in 2011, the same area (in particular the old United Glass Bottles site) was used for development of a new St Helens RLFC stadium and the construction of a Tesco Extra supermarket, to replace the smaller Tesco supermarket in the town centre. At 140,000 square metres, this Tesco Extra store is one of the biggest in England

Major investment is transforming former industrial land for use as hotels, shopping areas and housing after an initial landscape grading and character assessment project was concluded in late 2005 by Land Use Consultants on behalf of St Helens Borough Council.

=== Urban regeneration projects ===
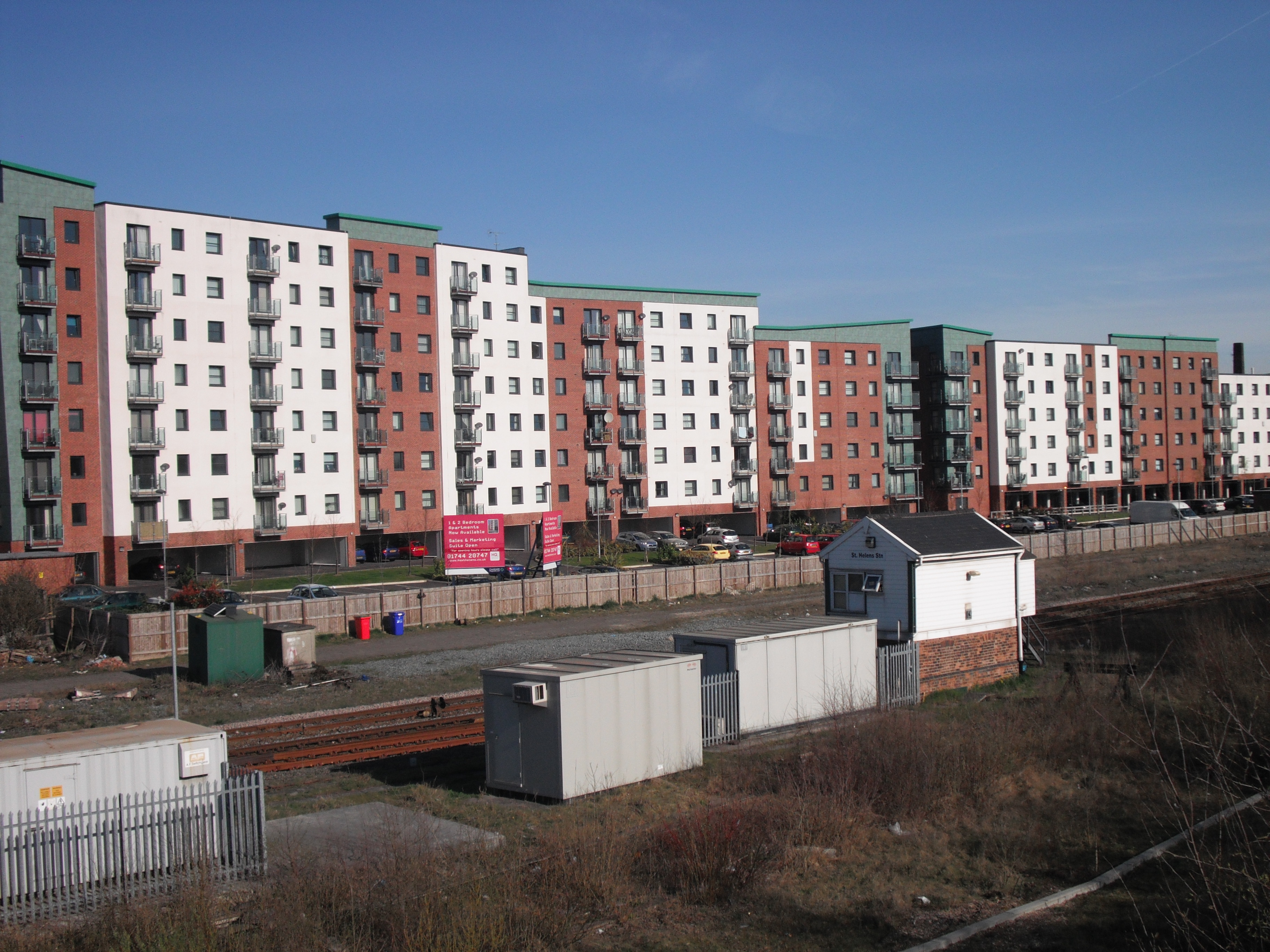
Modern apartments, part of a major redevelopment of the Town Centre.

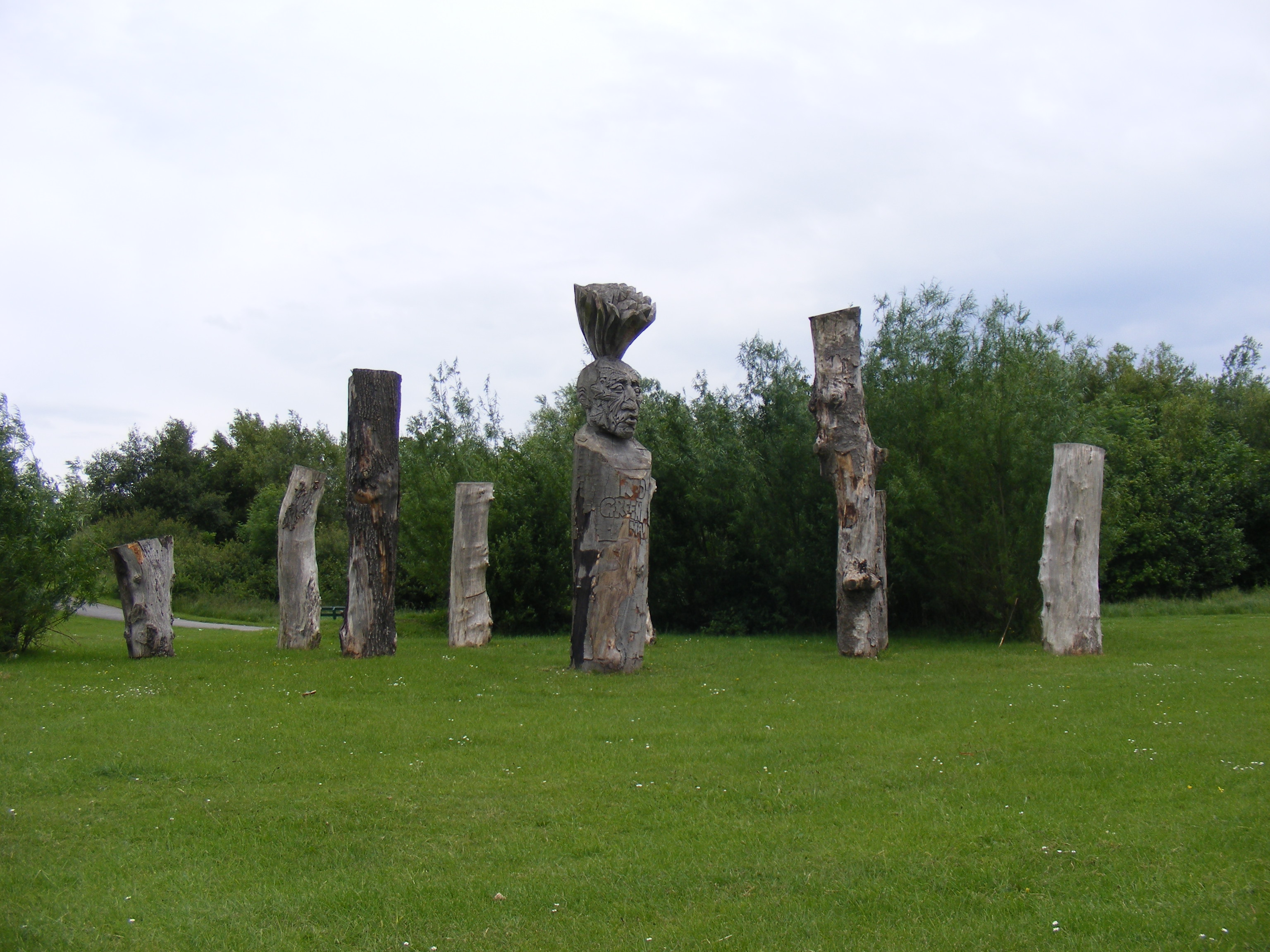
"The Green Man" art installation on The Duckeries in Parr. Part of Project Re:new.

Since the millennium St Helens has become a focus for a whole borough scheme of Urban Regeneration initiatives in coordination with local Housing Authorities, Business and Art Projects in addition to European, Regional and Central Government funding such as the Neighbourhood Renewal Fund, the North West Regional Development Agency and The Mersey Partnership as part of the European Regional Development Fund

The whole project is coordinated by St Helens Borough Council under their umbrella corporate branding "St Helens; The Heart of the North West" with an emphasis on promoting the location of the town as a vital hub of the region, to encourage investment and the development of business links.

In 2007, the Brand New St Helens project was launched and published their Development Review Document. The report set out the achievements in the years since the millennium and set out the future development projects for the town including the wholly rebuilt College Campus, and Cowley Language College (formerly Cowley High). The document also lays out retail, leisure and tourism developments for the Town.

In 2009, a Multi Area Agreement (MAA) was made with the Metropolitan Borough of St Helens agreeing to form part of the Liverpool City Region, a cross boundary cooperation of 5 adjoining authorities in Merseyside and the Halton Borough on strategic policy areas such as economic growth, transport, tourism, culture, housing, and physical infrastructure.

Local Projects such as "Re:new St Helens" operated in conjunction with Helena Housing was originally set up in 2006 in an effort to initially "make the Parr area of St Helens a better place to live, work and be part of". The scheme's success led to it being expanded to other identified areas in need of redevelopment including Four Acre (in Clock Face), Thatto Heath and the North of the Town Centre.

The Re:new projects coordinate a Partnership Board to meet the needs of local residents in conjunction with local service providers such as the council, Local Education Authority, Local Healthcare, Housing Associations and the Police to help improve services, identify local priorities and make changes with an aim to tackle "the quality of life issues which matter most to local people". The scheme has been responsible for the redevelopment of The Duckeries and Gaskell Park in Parr that both achieved Green Flag status in 2008

Since mid 2025, A new regeneration plan between St Helens Borough council and the English cities fund (ECF) has been set into motion. Regarding upgrading parts of the town centre, with its "Phase 1A" beginning with the demolition of the Hardshaw Centre, St Helens bus station, and the former Swan pub and Town Fryer chippy. With plans to construct a 120 bed hotel, 65 new homes, including apartments and townhouses, a market hall and retail units and public spaces. As well a new bus station to merge with the nearby railway station creating a multi-modal transport interchange atop the demolished buildings according to their Masterplan development framework.

=== Historic and notable buildings ===
A period postcard of the new (and current) Town Hall as it would have appeared in 1876.

An artists rendition of the Quaker Friends' Meeting House, a Grade II listed building.

St Helens Town Hall built in 1876 to replace the original 1839 building that was damaged by a fire in 1871; a further fire in 1913 destroyed the wooden steeple of its clock tower, which was never replaced.

In the centre of the modern town centre, adjacent to the town hall, is the Gamble Institute, built in 1896 and named after Sir David Gamble, who was the first mayor and who also gifted the land for the building. The Gamble Institute building served as the central library and also housed other municipal offices and archives until its closure in 2017 to undergo major structural works. It is scheduled to re-open in summer 2028.

Other buildings of note are:

The Friends' Meeting House, Church Street. The oldest building in the town centre is the attractive stone-built Grade II listed hall has been used for Quaker worship for almody 350 years having been bought and gifted, in 1679, by George Shaw of Bickerstaffe for use by his fellow Quakers. A sign at the front of the building reads "so used" since 1679, partly leading local historians to believe the building had been used for another purpose for quite a number of years before 1679. The building and garden have been recently restored and are an important element of the George Street Conservation Area. The sundial over the door of the meeting house is dated 1753, while a curiosity in the garden is a huge glacial boulder, said to have been deposited from the Lake District following the last ice age.

The Beecham Clock Tower, Westfield Street - which is now part of St Helens College is a Grade II listed building. This was the original headquarters of the Beecham pharmaceutical empire and completed in 1887 by the mysterious architect H.V. Krolow.

St Mary's Lowe House Catholic Church, North Road is a Grade II listed building, opened in 1929, the second on this site (the land having been donated by Winifred Gorsuch Lowe - hence the name 'Lowe House'). The church is an unusual and striking landmark with a 130 ft (40 m) tower and a dome of a mixed Romanesque and Gothic style. The major feature is the historic Carillon (bells playable using a keyboard, rather than by pulling ropes). It is the largest in the North West of England, housing 47 bells.

The Roman Catholic Church of St Anne and Blessed Dominic, Monastery Road, Sutton, is a pilgrimage site for Roman Catholics. The Victorian missionary Blessed Dominic Barberi is buried in the church. Alongside Blessed Dominic, Father Ignatius Spencer is buried. The son of the 2nd Earl Spencer, he was a famed convert to the Roman Catholic faith. Elizabeth Prout, foundress of the religious order, the Sisters of the Cross and Passion, is also buried with them.

== Geography ==
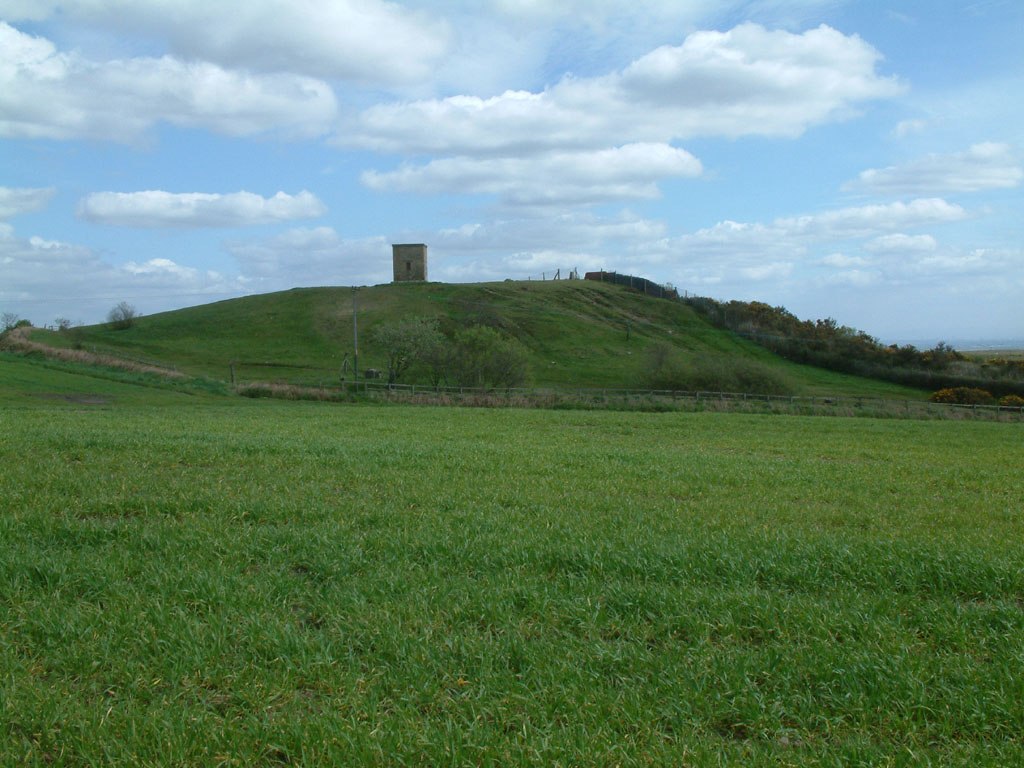
Billinge Hill is the highest point in St Helens and Merseyside

Approximately 22% of the St Helens Borough's 136 km^{2} (53 sq mi) is made up of soft rolling hills (30 km^{2} (12 sq mi)) used primarily for agricultural purposes, mainly arable. The highest point in the borough, and in the whole of Merseyside, is Billinge Hill, 5.6 km (3 mi) north of the town centre. From the top of this hill on a clear day the mountains of Snowdonia, fells of the Lake District and Blackpool Tower are all visible, as well as the cities of Manchester and Liverpool and the towns of Wigan, Bolton and Warrington. The Mill Brook/Windle Brook runs through Eccleston and connects with the disused St Helens branch/section of the Sankey Canal in the town centre. St Helens is around 160 feet (50 metres) above sea level.

Carr Mill Dam is Merseyside's largest body of inland water, with lakeside trails and walks. It is used for national competitive powerboating and angling events.

Moss Bank, a suburb of St Helens, is about 4 km (2 1/2 mi) north of the town centre. It has a community library and St David's church.

The Burgies are two tailings on the site of the old Rushy Park coal mine. They were created by dumping toxic chemical waste from the manufacture of glass; they have since been covered with tall grass and woodland.

St Helens was struck by an F1/T2 tornado on 23 November 1981, as part of the record-breaking nationwide tornado outbreak on that day. Damage from the tornado occurred in St Helens town centre.

=== Location ===
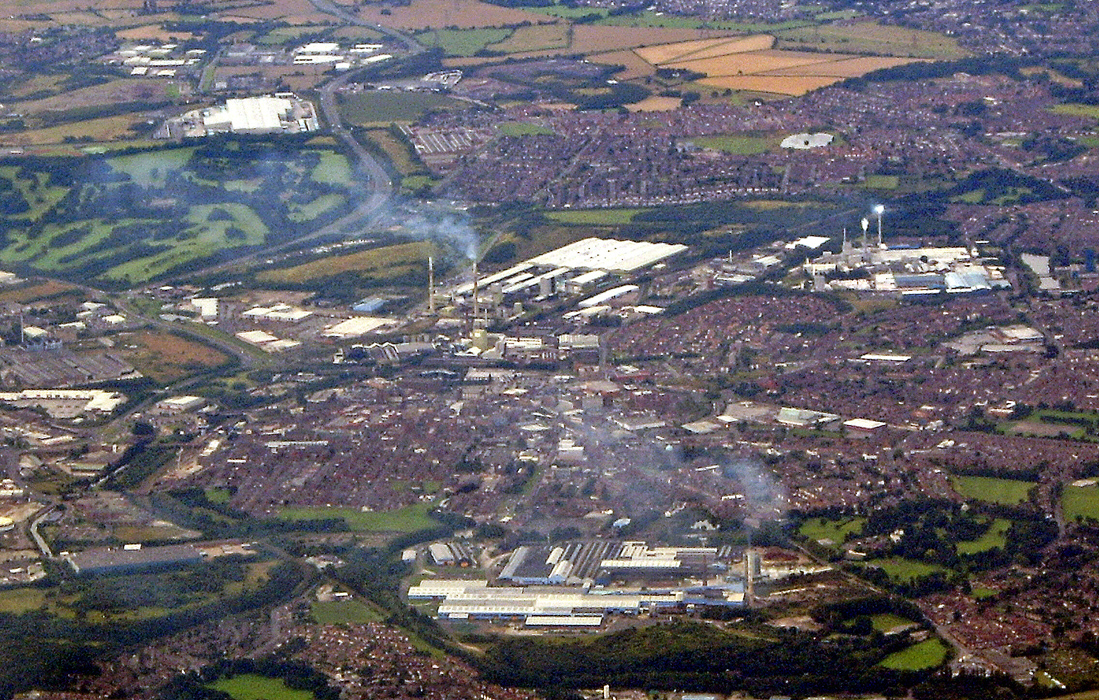
St Helens viewed looking south-west in 2007. The town centre is in the centre and the Linkway runs to the top, Sherdley Park is top left and Pilkington's Cowley Hill works is bottom centre.

St Helens is located 13 miles (21 km) to the east of Liverpool and 23 miles (37 km) from the centre of Manchester. The borough shares borders with the towns or boroughs of Prescot in Knowsley, Skelmersdale, Warrington, Widnes and Wigan; it has direct transport links by road and two main railway lines. Its centralised location has formed the basis of the local authority's promotional literature.

The town is considered part of the Liverpool Urban Area for ONS purposes.

== Transport ==
=== Road ===
St Helens is well served by motorway links with the east–west corridors of the M58 and M62 to the north and south of the town. The town is also served by the parallel-running north–south routes of the M57 and M6 to the east and west.

The M6 runs a few miles to the eastern side of the town centre, with J23 at Haydock serving both northbound and southbound traffic and J24 at Ashton in Makerfield serving southbound exit and northbound access.

The M62 runs a couple of miles to the south of the town with J7 at Rainhill Stoops. The M57's J2 lies several miles south-west of St. Helens, at Prescot. The M58 is several miles north, at the north-western end of the A570 Rainford by-pass dual carriageway.

The A580 East Lancashire Road runs north of the town centre alongside Eccleston, Moss Bank and through Haydock. It is a dual-carriageway former trunk road taking traffic from Manchester to the Liverpool Docks. It was built between 1929 and 1934 and was opened by King George V. It was intended to take pressure away from the A58, a major road running from Prescot (M57) through St Helens to the A1(M) at Wetherby, West Yorkshire.

The Rainford by-pass is a section of the A570, between the East Lancashire Road and the M58; it is part of the transport route from Southport, in Sefton, through west Lancashire and St Helens to the M62 J7 at Rainhill.

A major development in communication was the opening of the dual-carriageway St Helens Linkway (classified as part of the A570) in 1994, which linked the town centre directly with the M62 (at Rainhill). The A572 takes traffic from the town centre through Parr to Earlestown and Newton-le-Willows. In July 2020, the St Helens Linkway grass verge was chosen by St Helens Borough Council as a site on which to plant yellow flowers in a large heart shape, in memory of all who had died during the coronavirus pandemic.

In 2010, St Helens was proclaimed "UK's most car-friendly town" measured on variables such as "petrol prices, parking costs and the number of speed cameras in an assessment carried out by Virgin Money Car Insurance" in research conducted by The Independent newspaper.

=== Buses ===
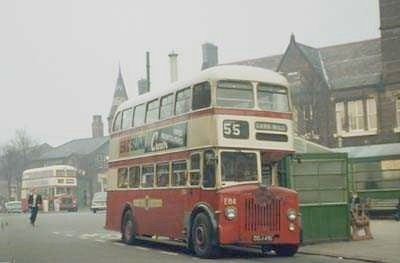
A St Helens Corporation liveried bus in 1968, in front of the Town Hall

Buses operated by Stagecoach Merseyside & South Lancashire on behalf of Merseytravel as part of the first phrase of Metro bus franchising

Bus services to Wigan (320, 352), Liverpool (10, 10A), Widnes (17) and Warrington (329) operate from the town centre. A brand new £32m central bus station, that sits between Bickerstaffe Street and Corporation Street, is being built to replace the old 1995 one. Due to open early 2027, a temporary bus station operates from Chalon Way.

From 1890, St Helens Corporation Transport organised public network services throughout the area, providing bus and trolleybus services. Following local government re-organisation in 1974, the Merseyside Passenger Transport Executive (Merseytravel) was expanded to cover St Helens. After privatisation in 1986, the town was served by several locally branded operations under the umbrella of Merseyside Transport Limited (MTL), in which Merseytravel retained shares until 1993.

Arriva purchased MTL in 2000 and has operated the majority of the routes since. Several smaller operators run specific routes within the town area, such as Cumfybus, Hattons, HTL Buses, Red Kite Stagecoach Merseyside & South Lancashire and local municipal bus companies. There were also three zero-fare services operated by battery-electric minibuses in and around the town centre, ferrying passengers to nearby retail parks such as Ravenhead, which were provided on behalf of Merseytravel by Selwyns Travel. From 22 February 2014, these buses were withdrawn from service as part of a Merseytravel programme of spending cuts and due to the buses being at end of their operational lives.

=== Railway ===
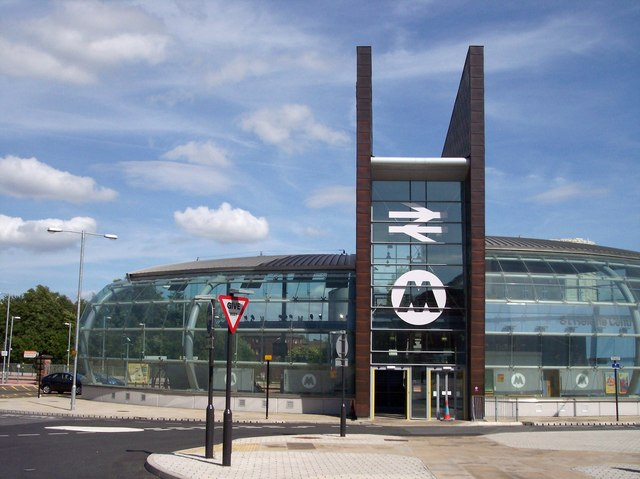
St Helens Central station, which was rebuilt in 2007

St Helens Central station serves the town centre. The stations of Thatto Heath, Eccleston Park and Garswood are on the Liverpool to Wigan Line that runs from Liverpool Lime Street to Wigan North Western.

The Liverpool to Manchester line serves the St Helens area at Rainhill, Lea Green and St Helens Junction before passing on to Earlestown and Newton-le-Willows. The St Helens Junction and Rainhill buildings are two of the original stations that were built when the line opened in 1830 and Earlestown is the oldest continually operated railway building in the world

Until the 1950s, three railway lines ran through St Helens:

- the current line from Liverpool Lime Street, through Huyton and St Helens, to Wigan North Western;
- a line from Widnes, through St Helens, to Rainford;
- a line starting at St Helens, running east through Haydock, to Lowton St Mary's on the LNER Wigan Junction line.

A major redevelopment of St Helens Central station was completed in 2007 at a cost of £6.2 million, which the council hoped would encourage investment, create more jobs and improve the gateway into the town. The building has been constructed using copper on the fins, in reference to the town's early industrial heritage.

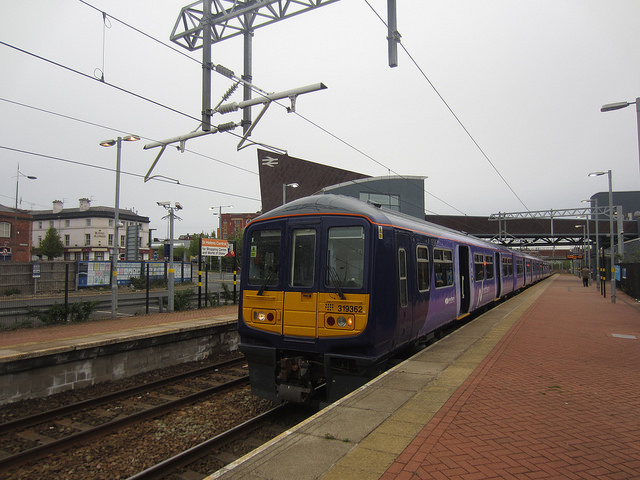
Northern Rail Class 319, no. 319362 Northern Powerhouse, at St Helens Central

In 2010, it was confirmed by the government that electrification both of the Liverpool to Manchester and Liverpool to Wigan lines would be implemented, with national body Network Rail announcing a projected overall completion date of 2014. Electrification work was eventually completed in 2015 and Northern Rail, the train operating company, announced the introduction of electric services on the line from the commencement of the new timetable changeover on 17 May 2015. The Liverpool to Wigan service was operated by 4-car Class 319 electric units from 2015 to 2023. The service is now operated by 3 and 4 car CAF Civity Class 331 units.

St Helens Borough Council has discussed the possibility of a new railway station at Carr Mill in Laffak.

=== Waterways ===
St Helens is a landlocked town, but it has easy access to the ports of Liverpool, on the River Mersey and Mostyn, and north Wales on the River Dee. The Sankey Canal, including the St Helens section, is no longer used for transporting goods; it consists of several short sections only, with the remainder being drained and filled.

=== Air ===
The nearest airport is Liverpool John Lennon Airport, located about 12 miles (19 km) south-west of the town and is connected by a frequent service from St Helens bus station (the 89 service). By road, it is accessed via the St Helens Linkway to M62 westbound J7 at Rainhill. There is no direct rail connection at present, although some trains calling at St Helens Central now go to Liverpool South Parkway station, which has shuttle buses connecting with the airport.

Manchester Airport is approximately 25 miles (40 km) away. By road, it is accessed via the St Helens Linkway to M62 eastbound J7 at Rainhill and by rail; the Manchester Airport train service serves St Helens Junction station.

=== Past links ===
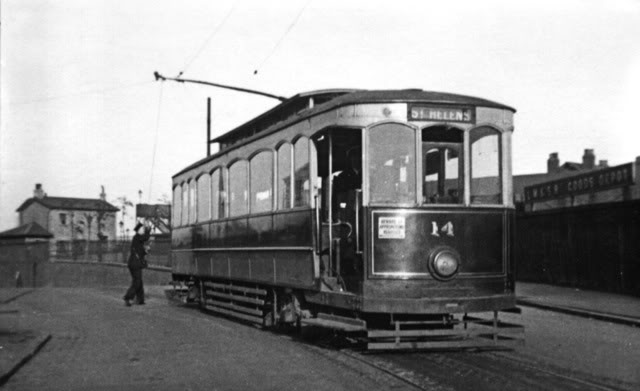
One of St Helens Corporation's trams.

An extensive tram and trolleybus system operated between 1880 and 1936. Trolleybus services commenced in 1927 and ceased 30 June 1958, when the last Prescot Circle trolleybus was replaced by a bus service. From 1919, the service was operated by the St Helens Corporation Tramways; prior to this, it had been operated by the St Helens and District Tramways Company and subsequently the New St Helens and District Tramways Company. Originally horse drawn, they became steam powered by 1890 and then electric by 1899. The original lines were all removed during the war for steel for the war effort. The only tram tracks left can be seen in the Transport Museum and one isolated trolleybus pole that carried the power lines can still be seen in Warrington Road, Peasley Cross.

A tram link also existed, to Windle and in Haydock, the latter serving Liverpool via Knotty Ash.

== Governance ==
=== Civic history ===
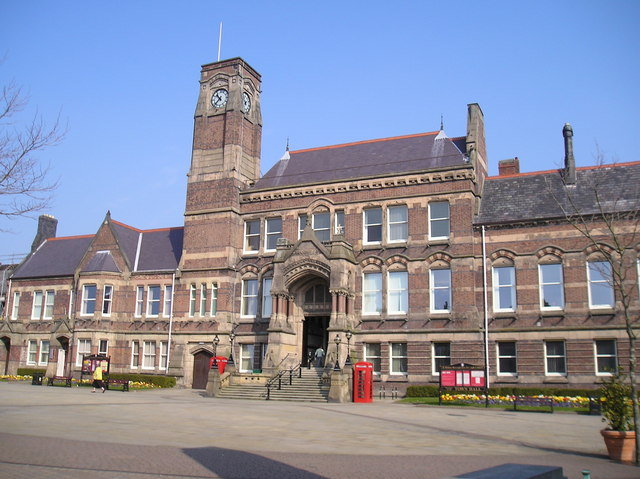
St Helens Town Hall as it appears today without the steeple.

St Helens first became responsible for the administration of the wider area in 1836 when made a registration sub-district of the Prescot Parish as part of the Municipal Corporations Act 1835 that devolved control down to the more localised parish control (spurred on by the Reform Act 1832).

St Helens, in Hardshaw of Windle, constructed its original town hall in 1839 that served as a legal court, meeting house, and administrative centre. It also held council meetings for aldermen and parishioners alike.

In 1868, St Helens was incorporated as a borough (covering the four townships). In response to the old, smaller, hall suffering fire damage in 1872 a new hall was planned. This current town hall was built between 1872 and 1876. In 1889 St Helens was again reformed, this time as a county borough with greater responsibility over an increased area of land. This was part of an ongoing process of local government restructure during the Victorian era, this time as part of the Municipal Corporations Act 1882.

As a county borough, St Helens was, from 1889 to 1974, inside the administrative county of Lancashire. On 1 April 1974, under the provisions of the Local Government Act 1972, St Helens became the administrative centre of the Metropolitan Borough of St Helens in the newly created Merseyside metropolitan county. At this time St Helens Borough Council replaced all the local councils within the prescribed area.

=== Historic coat of arms ===
St. Helens County Borough Council coat of arms 1876–1974, "Ex Terra Lucem" - "From the Ground, Light" granted in 1876

The old Town and Borough Council coat of arms were granted on 17 January 1876. The coat of arms is an Argent (white or silver) Field common to earlier coat of arms in the area. The black cross is referenced from the family of the Ecclestons. The saltires in the first and fourth quarters are from the arms of the Gerards of Windleshaw. The "second and third a griffon segreant" meanwhile are taken from the Bold family. The blue bars are from the arms of the Parr family, Marquises of Northampton. The lion is from the crest of the Walmsleys and the two fleurs-de-lys refer to Sir David Gamble, first Mayor and benefactor of the town, and the Haydock family.

As the council ceased to exist in 1974, these arms are since then no longer in use. The coat of arms of the present council of Metropolitan Borough of St Helens has taken over part of its design.

=== Motto ===
The motto was the Latin "Ex Terra Lucem". A literal translation would be "From the Ground, Light" whilst more descriptive translations might be "Light out of the earth" or "Out of the earth comes light". The phrase refers to both the abundant and winnable coal resources (which can be burnt, to produce "light") in addition to their use in local industry such as Glass (through which light passes).

The motto of the town and larger borough was changed in 1974 to "PROSPERITAS IN EXCELSIS" ("Success in the highest"or "Flourishing well"), which is included on the arms of the Metropolitan borough Council.

After the 2012 Summer Olympics opening ceremony, Frank Cottrell Boyce the creative writer behind Danny Boyle's opening ceremony revealed that the town motto was a significant influence to the Olympic cauldron designed by Thomas Heatherwick. The cauldron petals, once lit, started on the floor and rose up to form one torch.

The success and high profile of the games led the council and local residents to consider re-adopting "Ex Terra Lucem". It was felt that it was more appropriate to the town's history and had more meaning for local people, representing hope for the future. A number of people had raised this and requested that the Council consider replacing the motto.

A public consultation commenced on 17 January 2013 and at its meeting held on 17 April 2013, Council resolved to revert to the original motto of "Ex Terra Lucem". The Coat of Arms remained the same.

=== Parliamentary representation ===
St Helens is represented by the St Helens South and Whiston and St Helens North constituencies. Both contain areas outside of the town boundary, but within the greater Borough. Each constituency sends 1 representative to Parliament.

At the general election in 2015 both Dave Watts and Shaun Woodward stood down from their seats. David Watts MP (St Helens North) had been incumbent since 1997, whilst Shaun Woodward MP (St Helens South and Whiston) had retained his seat since 2001. Watts received a life peerage and became Baron Watts in December 2015.

Conor McGinn (St Helens North) and Marie Rimmer (St Helens South and Whiston) were selected as Labour Party candidates and both were elected as MPs in 2015.

Rimmer and McGinn both held their seats at the 2019 general election.

In 2024 McGinn stood down and David Baines, also of the Labour Party, was elected.

=== Local council representation ===
St Helens and its associated wards are represented by St Helens Metropolitan Borough Council.

The council was run by the Labour party from the first election in 1973 until an alliance between the Liberal Democrats and Conservatives took control after the 2006 election. Labour regained a majority at the 2010 election and as of the 2014 election the council was composed of the following councillors:

Party	Councillors
Labour Party	42
Liberal Democrats	3
Conservative Party	3

Following the 2022 local elections, the composition of St Helens Borough Council was as follows:

Party	Councillors
Labour Party	29
Liberal Democrats	4
Conservative Party	2
Independents	7
Green	6

Following the 2026 local elections the Labour party suffered a catastrophic loss of seats to Reform UK. The composition of St Helens Borough Council is as follows:

Party	Councillors
Reform Party	34
Liberal Democrats	3
Labour Party	3
Conservative Party	1
Independents	6

=== Parish councils ===
St Helens is also served by several parish councils. Their activity is much reduced in the modern borough, but are still active in the communities and are recognised by the Borough Council as they may "undertake many duties such as street lighting, managing cemeteries, allotments, commons, village halls, war memorials and markets etc".

St Helens Borough Council lists the parish councils as:

- Billinge Parish Council
- Bold Parish Council
- Eccleston Parish Council
- Rainford Parish Council
- Rainhill Parish Council
- Seneley Green Parish Council
- Windle Parish Council

== Demography ==
Christianity is the main religion in St Helens Borough. At the 2001 census this was reported at around 87%. This made St Helens the "most Christian town in Britain" at that time. St Helens also had second fewest people (out of 376 local authorities) that actively described themselves as having no religion at all. However at the time of the 2021 census, the percentage of the population identifying as Christian decreased to 62.3% with the percentage of people described as having no religion at all increasing to 31.2%. The second largest religious group was recorded as Muslim (0.7%).

At the time of the 2001 census, there was little ethnic minority representation in St Helens, amongst the lowest levels in the country. 98.84% of the St Helens population described itself as White British in 2001. The largest ethnic minority in St Helens in 2001 was recorded as Indian with 409. At the 2021 census, the percentage of the population identifying as White British stood at 93.6%, followed by White (Other) at 2.9%, Asian (1.4%), and Black (0.4%).

== Education ==
=== Primary schools ===
The Borough of St Helens has one nursery school, one infant school, one junior school, fifty-two primary schools and one independent school for pupils aged 3–16. Performance in the Key Stage 1 and Key Stage 2 SATs has been consistently above national averages over the past 5 years.

=== Schools for children with special educational needs ===
There are three SEN schools in St Helens - Penkford, Mill Green and Lansbury Bridge.

=== Secondary schools ===
The Borough of St Helens has one independent and nine maintained secondary schools:

- Cowley International College
- De La Salle School
- Hope Academy
- Outwood Academy Haydock
- Rainford High School
- Rainhill High School
- St Augustine of Canterbury Catholic Academy
- St Cuthbert's Catholic High School
- The Sutton Academy
- Tower College

=== Further education ===
The town has seven educational institutions offering post-16 education in: Cowley International College, Rainford High Technology College, Rainhill High School and Sixth Form Centre, The Sutton Academy, Hope Academy - (all 11-18 secondary schools), Carmel College (a sixth form college) and St Helens College (a general FE college). Carmel College is a leading college in the country with a value added score of 328. The college is an associate of the University of Liverpool. St Helens College, which has recently rebuilt its Town Centre Campus, offers a wide variety of Higher and Further Education courses including degree courses, foundation degrees, BTECs and professional qualifications at the college's Business School. The college has a growing reputation for its standards and achievements. Recently, St Helens College has opened a University Centre. Locals who stay in the area and go to university often take advantage of the surrounding universities such as: Edge Hill (Ormskirk), Liverpool, Manchester, Salford and Chester. St Helen's Chamber is a strong provider of school leaver and post-16 apprenticeships and courses too.

== Media ==
There is one local weekly newspaper, the St Helens Star, which is freely distributed and available to buy in supermarkets, and is published every Thursday.

Local news and television programmes are provided by BBC North West and ITV Granada. Television signals are received from the Winter Hill TV transmitter.

Local radio stations are Central Radio North West which broadcasts via a DAB transmitter located at Billinge_Hill. Regional radio stations are BBC Radio Merseyside, Heart North West, Hits Radio Liverpool, Greatest Hits Radio Wigan & St Helens (formerly Wish FM, named after Wigan (Wi) and St Helens (SH)) and, Relax Radio, an internet-based community radio station based in St Helens.

St Helens College has previously made temporary, limited service FM radio broadcasts from their Town Centre Campus. In December 2010, the St Helens College radio station re-commenced broadcasting under the banner 'Solar 1287 AM'.

== Culture and leisure ==
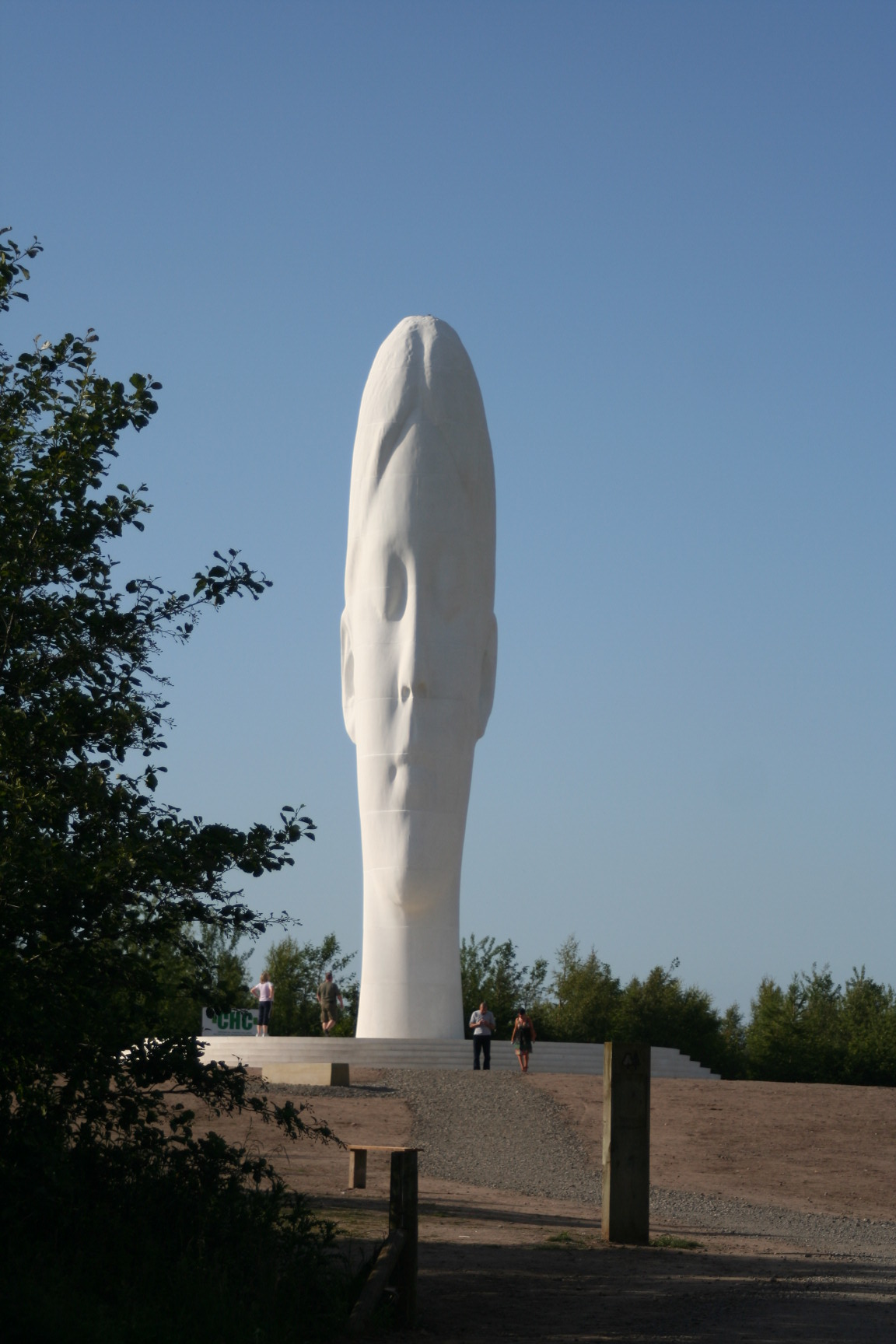
Dream unveiled in 2009

=== Museums ===
Located in the town centre, The World of Glass Museum opened in 2000 incorporating the Pilkington Glass Museum and the St Helens Local Museum.

The North West Museum of Road Transport is another museum located in the town. The Smithy Heritage Centre is a small museum in Kiln Lane, Eccleston about the works of a local blacksmith.

=== Parks, open spaces and nature walks ===
The borough of St Helens has several major parks and open spaces. These include the Taylor Park, a listed Grade II Historic Park and Garden opened in 1893, as well as Victoria Park located near the town centre.

Sherdley Park is a modern park in Sutton which used to feature a funfair in the summer, usually in July. Called the St Helens Festival (originally named the St Helens Show), it was one of the biggest free festivals in Europe.

Parr has Gaskell Park in addition to the reclaimed open space known as The Duckeries (or Ashtons Green), and shares a boundary with boggy heathland known as "The Moss" or "Colliers Moss" (traditionally associated with Bold and its power station), and the area known as the "Flash" (remnants of the canal tributary system and fishing ponds) with a nature walk along part of the 7 mi (11 km) route that makes up the Sankey Valley Country Park (part of the Trans Pennine trail).

A 20m tall sculpture, called Dream, has been erected on a former colliery in Sutton Manor in St Helens.

Gaskell Park, Taylor Park and The Duckeries all received Green Flag Award status in 2009. King George V Park received a Green Flag Award in 2012.

=== Theatre ===
==== The Citadel Theatre ====
The first Theatre Royal was built on Bridge Street, opening in 1847 and was a large wooden barn. This was open for several seasons until heavy snow caused the roof to collapse. It was replaced by a new Theatre Royal on Milk Street.

Revill built a new theatre on Corporation Street and transferred the Theatre Royal name to this instead.

The Milk Street theatre was then purchased by the Salvation Army where it was more or less completely re-built internally. It was renamed SA Citadel and was used for this purpose for nearly 90 years, until the Salvation Army moved to a newer site. It was then opened as The Citadel Arts Centre in 1988 and was refurbished in 2000.

In 2019 it was announced that the Citadel Arts Centre would close on 30 June 2019 but that the Citadel Arts Charity would continue working with the support of a crowdfunding campaign.

==== The Theatre Royal ====
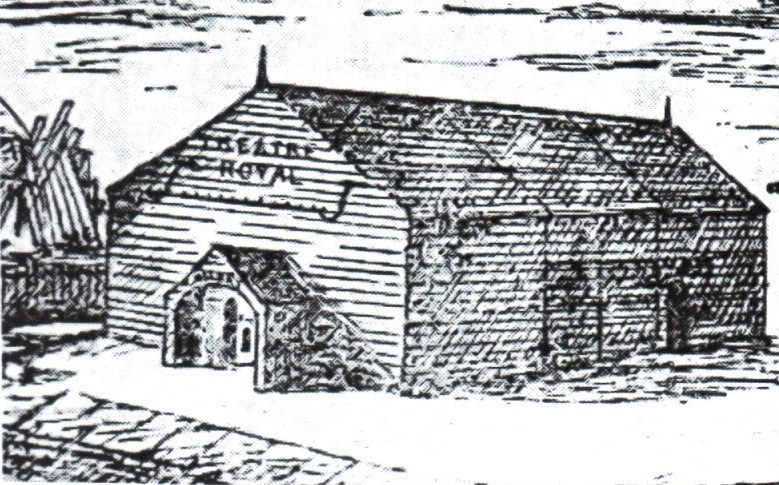
The first Theatre Royal, a wooden barn-type building which was situated behind the Running Horses pub in Bridge St.

Postcard Illustration of the original Theatre Royal (Matcham design)

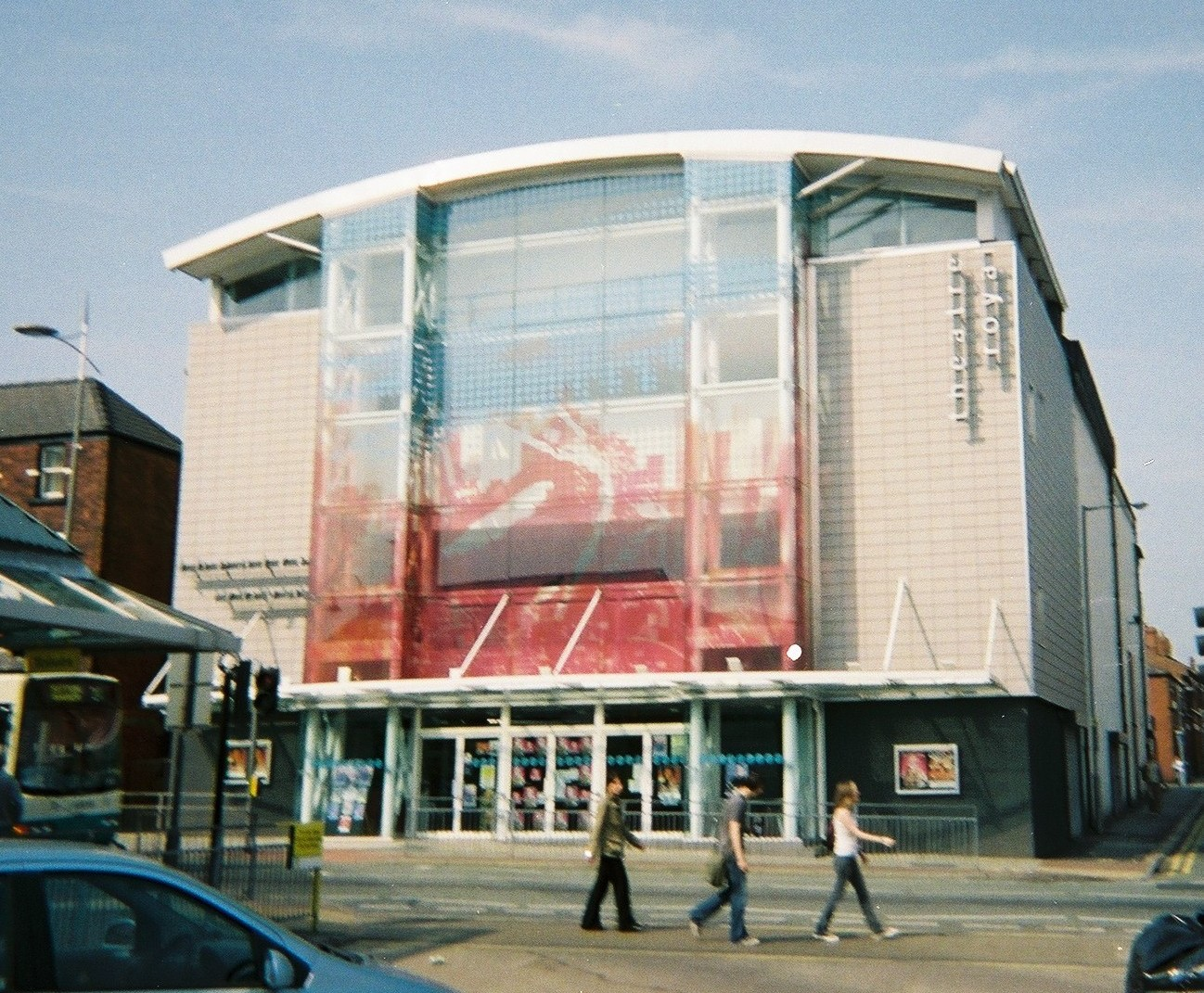
The present-day Theatre Royal

The Theatre Royal opened by Revill on Corporation Street in 1889 was relatively short-lived as it was severely damaged by fire in 1901. It was then reconstructed by revered theatre architect Frank Matcham. The Matcham theatre was designed in a baroque style with ornate balconies, chandeliers and boxes. In the 1960s the theatre was purchased by Pilkingtons and was gutted internally. The auditorium was refurbished removing all traces of the original interior design, whilst the ornate frontage was replaced with a plain glass façade. This was subsequently heavily refurbished in 2001.

The theatre is today a venue with touring acts and annual pantomime. There are performances by local amateur operatic and dramatic societies, schools and dancing academies.

== Sport ==
=== Rugby league ===
==== Professional ====
St Helens is home to St Helens R.F.C., known commonly in the sport as 'Saints', who play in British Super League. The club were founded in 1873, and were one of the founding teams of Rugby Football League in 1895. They played their home games at Knowsley Road in Eccleston from 1890, but in 2012 moved to a modern stadium at the BrewDog Stadium. The club has a historic rivalry with the Wigan Warriors. They have been one of the most successful teams of the modern Super League era.

==== Amateur ====
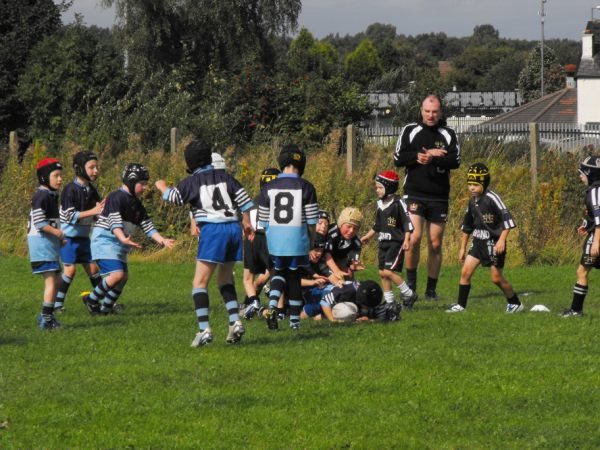
A local Rugby League junior game underway

The town is also home to a large number of amateur rugby league teams comprising senior and youth teams. Most notable of these are Blackbrook A.R.L.F.C., Bold Miners, Clock Face Miners, Haresfinch Hawks, Portico Vine, Haydock Warriors, Pilkington Recs and Thatto Heath Crusaders. Most of these teams and others in the area compete in the BARLA North West Counties competition (Pilkingtons in the Premier League, Haydock and Blackbrook in Division 1, Thatto Heath and Clock Face in Division 2). Thatto Heath compete in the higher ranked National Conference League.

The Blackbrook Royals have contributed 26 Lancashire Cup winning sides across 8 age ranges from U12 to U18, with two in the Open Age category and 10 National Cups. Pilkington Recs has 17 wins (and 6 times runner up) and Thatto Heath, 10.

The St Helens R.F.C. Under 18s and 16s and St Helens R.F.C. Academy teams serve as official feeders to Saints.

=== Rugby union ===
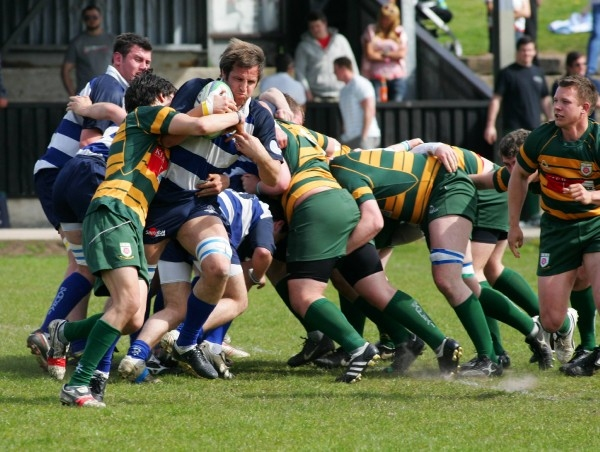
West Park (in green) play.

St Helens is home to several amateur rugby union teams. Liverpool St Helens F.C. are the most prominent union team in a town where the league code takes precedence. The team claims to be "the oldest open rugby club in the world" based on its origins in the formation of Liverpool Football Club (not to be confused with the later association football team of the same name) in 1857.

Liverpool St Helens operate, in addition to their first team, both multiple senior, colts and junior teams, and in addition have an U18 and U15 girls rugby team as part of their "open" and inclusive rugby approach. In 2008 the club announced an unveiling of its Centre of Excellence in coordination with Sportsmatch (a department of Sport England).

Several local social, sports and leisure clubs host their own teams, including the most successful club in the town of recent history West Park St Helens (commonly referred to simply as West Park), that currently play in National League 3 North, and Ruskin Park R.F.C That currently play in North Division 3 West.

=== Association football ===
St Helens Town FC is an amateur English football club, currently playing in the first division of the Liverpool County Premier League. The club formerly played their games at Knowsley Road they then moved to play at Ashton Athletic FC, and now play at Ruskin Drive Sports Ground. St Helens Town FC won the FA Vase in the 1986–87 season, defeating local rivals Warrington Town F.C. 3-2 in the final at Wembley Stadium.

F.C. St Helens are in the Division One North of the North West Counties Football League. Pilkington F.C. are also in the first division of the North West Counties League.

The town previously had its own amateur football league, the St Helens & District Football Combination which ran from the 1917–18 season to 2016.

In 2009, Brazilian Soccer Schools St Helens launched specialist soccer and futsal centres on the region to teach junior and youth players futsal.

St Helens W.F.C were founded in 1976 and had a lot of early success in the 1980s by reaching the Women's FA Cup final four times. In the 1980 WFA Cup final they defeated Preston North End 1-0 to secure the trophy, with Sue Holland scoring the winning goal at Southbury Park. The club were subsequently runners-up at the 1981, 1983 and 1987 cup finals. England Internationals Janet Turner, Alison Leatherbarrow and English Football Hall of Famer Sheila Parker all played for the club. The club dissolved in 2006.

=== Cricket ===
St Helens is home to several amateur cricket sides. St Helens Cricket Club, formed in 1843, was dissolved in 2012. St Helens Recreation Cricket Club formed in 1847 are now the most senior club in the town and play in the Liverpool and District Cricket Competition.

Sutton, Haydock, Rainhill and Newton le Willows also have their own local cricket clubs with representation from 11 to multiple senior teams.

=== Other sports ===
The town was formerly home to the amateur American football team St Helens Cardinals. The Cardinals were active between 1984 and 1998, winning the UKAFL Championship in 1987 with a 28–26 win over the Ipswich Cardinals. In 2019 the St Helens Cardinals were reformed to play the 8-on-8 format of the game under the British Gridiron League.

Greyhound racing took place at two venues; at the St Helens Greyhound Racing and Sports Stadium (1932–1993) and around the pitch at the Hoghton Road Stadium (1993–2001). The racing was independent (not affiliated to the sports governing body the National Greyhound Racing Club) and they were known as flapping tracks, which was the nickname given to independent tracks.

St. Helens Miners (later known as the Northwestern Miners) were an Australian rules football Club based in the town. Formed in 2002, the club took part in 3 seasons from 2002 to 2004.

== Youth organisations ==
=== Scouts ===
The Scout have been active in St Helens since 1907 and the movement has been active continuously since then. The first official Scout Troop opened at the YMCA in 1908. The Group was opened following a visit to St Helens in 1908 by Lord Baden Powell himself.

In 2007, the District celebrated its Centenary of 100 Years of scouting across the town with a whole District Camp at the local Bispham Hall Scout Estate.

In 2018, the District adopted the new Skills For Life strategy and branding for the UK Scout Movement.

The District has headquarters in Sutton Leach. The District owns a purpose-built Scout Hut and surrounding land, open for all members of the District to use.

=== Cadet forces ===
All three military cadet forces have a presence in St Helens; them being:

- 969 (St Helens) Squadron is the local squadron of the Royal Air Force Air Cadets
- Merseyside Army Cadet Force, has a troop of cadets based at Jubilee Barracks, that are affiliated to the 103 Regiment, HQ of the Royal Artillery.
- The Sea Cadet Corps, maintains Training Ship Scimitar, at Mill Street Barracks.

== Cultural references ==
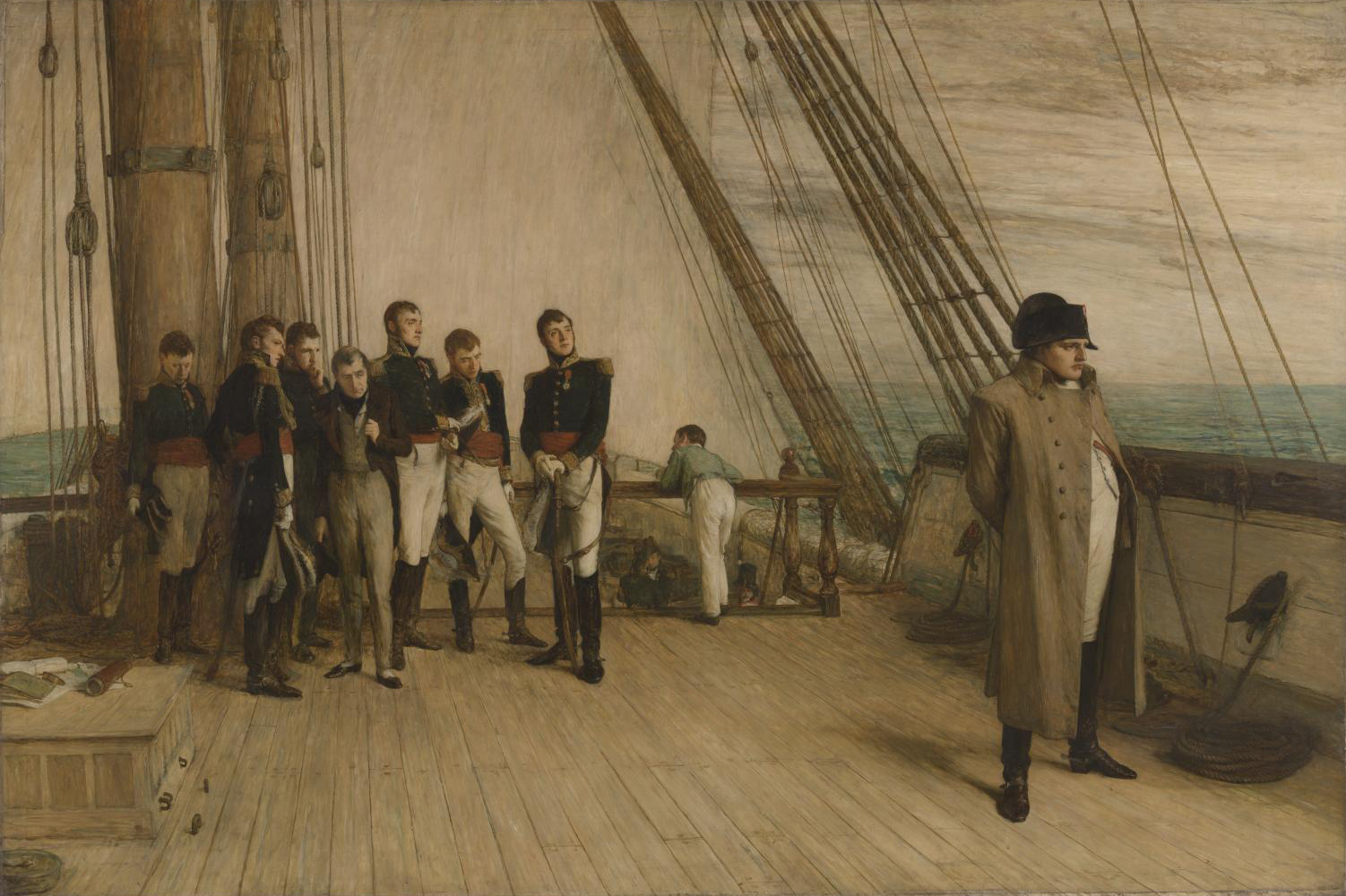
Napoleon on Board the Bellerophon by William Quiller Orchardson, 1880

A famous Punch cartoon based on the painting Napoleon on Board the Bellerophon, exhibited in 1880 by Sir William Quiller Orchardson, had the caption "He's utterly convinced that he's being exiled to St. HELEN'S, poor devil!". This was a pun on Saint Helena, the South Atlantic island to which Napoleon was exiled.

== Notable people ==
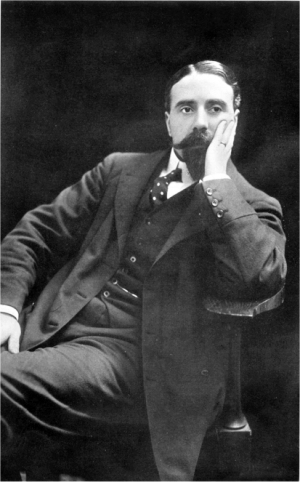
Conductor Sir Thomas Beecham in 1910 Stephen Bunting és Michael Smith dartsjátékosok

== International links ==
St Helens is twinned with:

- Chalon-sur-Saône, Saône-et-Loire, Bourgogne-Franche-Comté, France
- Stuttgart, Baden-Württemberg, Germany

== See also ==
- Listed buildings in St Helens
- Sutton Mill Dam
- St Helens power station
