= Carmel College (St Helens) =

Catholic mixed sixth form college in Merseyside, England

- Established: 1987
- Administrative staff: 34
- Students: 2,200
- Location: St. Helens, England, UK; 53°26′32″N 2°46′11″W
- Website: carmel.ac.uk

Carmel College is a Roman Catholic mixed sixth form college located in St Helens, Merseyside, England, and welcomes students of all faiths.

== History ==
The college opened in 1987 to just over four hundred students and currently has approximately 2,200 students, the majority of whom study AS and A2 courses with the remainder following Level 1 and 2 courses or post-18 courses such as the foundation art diploma or university degrees.

In 1999, Carmel College became the first Associate College of the University of Liverpool offering a range of 4 year Science and Engineering degree courses with the first year of study at Carmel College. In 2006, the college started a new programme offering students a Foundation Year Zero that leads directly on to Medicine, Dentistry and Veterinary Sciences at the University of Liverpool. This route is open to mature students who for a variety of reasons are missing the required A-Levels generally needed for the aforementioned degrees. This route has proven to be highly successful and has exceeded all expectations. In 1999, Carmel also became one of the first of four sixth form colleges in England to be designated a Beacon College. Over the past 3 years, the quality of teaching at Carmel has been consistently in the top 10% of 2, 580 schools and colleges nationally (ALPS: A Level Performance System) The college has 100% Pass Rate in 42 courses, with 55% of grades at A*-B and 80% of grades at A*-C and also has 100% BTEC Pass Rate and 91% of BTEC grades at Distinction*/Distinction. Opportunities for student development include High Achievers and Enrichment Programmes such as Duke of Edinburgh, MedSoc, work experience, learning languages such as Mandarin and other notable societies. In its latest Ofsted inspection, Carmel was judged to be "outstanding in all aspects of its provision." Also noted as being the 9th best in the UK.

During 30 April–3 May 2019, Ofsted inspected Carmel College and it achieved an overall rating of Outstanding, a rating it has held since 2002.

Previous head teacher, Rob Peacock retired in 2016 after 29 years association with the college. He started out as a science teacher at Mount Carmel High School, an all-girls school which existed on the site before the sixth-form.

== Alumni ==
- Johnny Vegas (b. 1970) - comedian and actor
- Jacqui Abbott (b. 1973) - female vocalist from The Beautiful South
- Paul Wellens (b. 1980) - Great Britain and England international rugby league footballer playing for St Helens RLFC
- Anthony Gordon (b. 2001) - english footballer playing with Newcastle United
- Jarrad Branthwaite (b. 2002) - english footballer playing with Everton
