= Kidgell =

Kidgell is a surname. Notable people with the surname include:

- Henry Morley Kidgell (1881–1948), Australian rules footballer
- Ian Kidgell (born 1970), Australian rules footballer
- James Kidgell (1837–1915), Australian politician in Queensland
- John Kidgell (c. 1721–c. 1780), English cleric and author
