= William Parker (priest, died 1802) =

William Parker (bapt. 1714 – 1802) was an English cleric, known as a pulpit orator, controversialist and royal chaplain to two kings. He became a Fellow of the Royal Society in 1746.

== Life ==
The son of Moses Parker of St Michael's parish, Coventry, he was born in the city in 1714. He matriculated on 6 July 1731 at Balliol College, Oxford, where he graduated B.A. in 1735, M.A. in 1738, B.D. in 1751, and D.D. in 1754. On 19 February 1746 he was admitted a fellow of the Royal Society. He was a Fellow of Balliol from 1737 to around 1750, lecturing on logic and mathematics, and was mostly in Oxford.

In 1752 Parker was made vicar of St Katharine Cree in London. On 14 March 1757 he was collated to the prebend of Pratum Minus in Hereford Cathedral. On 23 April 1760 he was appointed treasurer of the cathedral, with the rectory of Bockleton in the diocese. These positions he owed to the favour of the bishop, Lord James Beauclerk. On 18 November 1763 he was presented to the rectory of St James's Church, Piccadilly, a good living, in succession to Samuel Nicolls. It came about because he was chaplain to Richard Osbaldeston, Bishop of London, when the vacancy occurred. Osbaldeston appointed Parker to parry an unpalatable candidate, John Kidgell, being pressed on him by John Montagu, 4th Earl of Sandwich.

Parker was also one of the chaplains in ordinary to George II and then George III. After his marriage, on 28 September 1776 he was installed prebendary of North Kelsey in Lincoln Cathedral. But, as Aston remarks, "the influence of his brother-in-law was insufficient to win him a bishopric."

== Works ==
Parker was known as a preacher, and his works consisted mainly of single sermons, in which he defended conventional revealed religion and the Mosaic history, against the deist attacks of Henry Bolingbroke, Conyers Middleton and Thomas Morgan. Among his publications were:

- The Expediency of Some Divine Interpositions, 1749. In relation to the Richard Dugdale case and the scepticism of Zachary Taylor, Parker was among the critics of Conyers Middleton who conceded that some of his points were well taken.
- Two Discourses on the Mosaick History of the Fall, preached in his Majesty's Chapel, Whitehall, Oxford, 1750. On 2 Cor. xi. 3.
- A Letter to a Person of Scrupulous Conscience about the Time of keeping Christmas, according to the New-Stile. To which is added, A Dialogue between a Clergyman and his Parishioner, familiarly explaining the Reason and Expediency of the New-Stile, London, 1753; 2nd edit. 1756.
- Two Discourses before the University of Oxford: in which are contained Remarks on some Passages in the Writings of the late Lord Viscount Bolingbroke, Oxford, 1754. On John xviii. 38.
- The Scripture Doctrine of Predestination stated and explained. In two Discourses preached before the University of Oxford, Oxford, 1759. It followed two decades of Methodist debate on predestinarianism.
- Several Discourses on Special Subjects, preached before the University of Oxford, and upon other Occasions, 2 vols. Oxford, 1790.

== Family and death ==
Parker married in 1768 Mary Whitwell, who on the death of her brother John Griffin, 4th Baron Howard de Walden in 1797, succeeded to a large fortune. She died at Bath on 18 November 1799, aged 70. He survived her three years, dying at his house in Piccadilly on 22 July 1802. He was buried in a vault under St James's Chapel, Hampstead Road.

Since Parker and his wife were entitled to the family estates for their joint lives, it was not until his death in 1802 that Richard Griffin, 2nd Baron Braybrooke, became actually possessed of Audley End, Essex. He had in fact resided there from 1797, under an arrangement suggested by the 4th Baron Howard de Walden. A portrait of Parker was kept at Audley End.
