= Richard Heyrick =

Church of England clergyman

The Reverend Richard Heyrick
- Warden of Manchester Collegiate Church
- Diocese: Chester
- Appointed: 1635
- Term ended: 1667

Orders
- Ordination: c. 1625

Personal details
- Born: 9 September 1600
- Died: 6 August 1667 (aged 67)
- Buried: Manchester Collegiate Church
- Denomination: Anglican
- Spouse: Helen Corbet (m. ?; died ?); Anna Maria Hall (m. 1642)
- Children: 13 (7 by first wife, 6 by second)
- Education: St. John's college, Oxford

Richard Heyrick (1600 – 1667) was a Church of England clergyman and divine who served as warden of Manchester Collegiate Church.

== Life ==
Richard Heyrick, born in London on 9 September 1600, was cousin to Robert Herrick, the poet and son of Sir William Hericke, alderman and goldsmith of London, who purchased Beaumanor, Leicestershire. He was educated at Merchant Taylors' School, London, and St. John's College, Oxford, where he became a commoner in 1617. He graduated BA on 19 October 1619 and MA on 26 June 1622. He is also styled BD. By particular recommendation of the King, he was elected as a fellow of All Souls College on 14 January 1624–5. At that time, he took orders and was instituted on 9 June 1626 at the rectory of North Repps, Norfolk. There had been many money transactions between James I and Heyrick's father. By way of settlement of a loan Sir William received for his son, the reversion of the wardenship of Manchester Collegiate Church, which was granted by Charles I by letters patent of 14 November 1626. Heyrick succeeded to the wardenship in 1635, but not without some preliminary difficulty, which Archbishop Laud claimed the credit of overcoming.

In 1641, he published Three Sermons preached at the Collegiate Church in Manchester, 8vo, denouncing Romanists and High Episcopalians with bitter prejudice and vindictive sarcasm. He identified himself with the Presbyterians and eventually became the chief pillar of that party in Lancashire. In 1642, he drew up an address from the county of Lancaster to Charles I, containing what was, in effect, an offer to mediate between the King and Parliament for peace and reconciliation. On 23 April of the same year, Heyrick, who had about that time taken the Covenant, was appointed by Parliament one of the divines for Lancashire to be consulted about Church government, the other being Charles Herle, rector of Winwick, and on 9 October 1643 he was one of the ministers appointed by the House of Commons to decide upon the orthodoxy and maintenance of Lancashire ministers. He was the main instrument in establishing Lancashire's Presbyterian system in 1646.

He wrote the Harmonious Consent of the Ministers within the County Palatine of Lancaster with their Reverend Brethren, the Ministers of the Province of London, &c., 1648, 4to. Along with Richard Hollinworth, he acted as moderator of the Lancashire synod, and in the affairs of the Manchester classis, his influence was predominant, and his care in all matters, especially in providing valuable and pious ministers, was conspicuous. As a member of the assembly of divines, he preached before the House of Commons on 27 May 1646. In this sermon, afterwards printed with the title of Queen Esther's Resolves, or a Princely Pattern of Heaven-born Resolution, he makes pathetic mention of the services of Manchester in the cause of God and the Kingdom and of the impoverished condition of the Church's ministers in that town.

He was a zealous co-operator in the work of the collegiate chapter and a sturdy defender of its rights whenever assailed. By his remonstrance, he procured the restoration of the Church revenues, which Parliament had taken away in 1645. On the dissolution of the collegiate body in 1650, he was allowed to retain his position as one of the town's ministers at a salary of 100l. In 1657–8, he took an active part in the proceedings described in a volume entitled The Censures of the Church Revived, 4to, 1659, occasioned by the Rev. Isaac Allen, rector of Prestwich, with others, disputing the authority of the Manchester classis in matters of Church discipline.

He was consistent in his loyalty to the King, strongly protesting on several occasions against the growing power and republican principles of the Independents. In 1651, he was arrested for being implicated in Love's plot for the Restoration of Charles II. He was imprisoned in London, but through the influence, it is supposed, of George Booth, 1st Lord Delamere, was pardoned and released. When Booth rose in Cheshire in 1659, Heyrick, although sympathetic, was hesitant in action, like many other ministers. He hailed the Restoration enthusiastically in a sermon preached on 23 April 1661 and afterwards published without his authority. He complied with the Act of Uniformity by "reading the service book" on 14 September 1662 and maintained his position of warden until his death, having no doubt moderated his religious tenets. Before 1662, he had held Thornton-in-the-Moors rectory near Chester, along with the Manchester wardenship. He also held the rectory of Ashton-upon-Mersey, Cheshire, from 14 July 1640 to 1642.

He was twice married: first, when he was at North Repps, to Helen, daughter of Thomas Corbet of Sprowston, Norfolk, by whom he had seven children; and secondly, in 1642, to Anna Maria Hall, a widow, daughter of Erasmus Breton of Hamburg. By his second wife, he had six children.

He died on 6 August 1667, aged 67, and was buried in the choir of the Manchester Collegiate Church. A long Latin epitaph, written by his old friend Thomas Case, is inscribed on his monument. The eulogy is extravagant, but Heyrick was a fair scholar, an eloquent preacher, and a conscientious man, if somewhat impetuous in temper. Henry Newcome, in dedicating his book, the Sinner's Hope, 1660, to Heyrick, speaks in high laudation of "his much-honoured brother and faithful fellow-labourer in the congregation" at Manchester.

== Sources ==
- Nichols's Leicestershire, iii. 159;
- Wood's Athenæ Oxonienses (Bliss), iii. 780;
- Wood's Fasti, i. 386, 406;
- Hibbert-Ware's Manchester Foundations;
- Raines's Wardens of Manchester (Chetham Society), ii. 122;
- Newcome's Diary and Autobiography (Chetham Society);
- Worthington's Diary (Chetham Society), ii. 236;
- Martindale's Diary (Chetham Society);
- Dugdale's Visitation of Lancaster (Chetham Society), ii. 138;
- Palatine Note-book, i. 19, 20, 81, 104, 155, 167, ii. 183, 233;
- Earwaker's Manchester Court Leet Records, iv. 283;
- Journals of House of Commons, iii. 270, iv. 127, v. 662, 663;
- Bibliography in Transactions of the Lancashire and Cheshire Antiquarian Society vii. 134.

== Bibliography ==
- Sutton, Charles William (1891). "Heyrick, Richard" . In Stephen, Leslie; Lee, Sidney (eds.). Dictionary of National Biography. Vol. 26. London: Smith, Elder & Co. pp. 325–327.
