= Richard Dugdale =

Richard Dugdale is the name of:

- Richard Dugdale (alleged demoniac) (born 1670), English gardener, alleged to have been possessed by the devil
- Richard Louis Dugdale (1841–1883), American merchant and sociologist
