= North West Museum of Road Transport =

Coordinates: 53.454°N 2.731°W

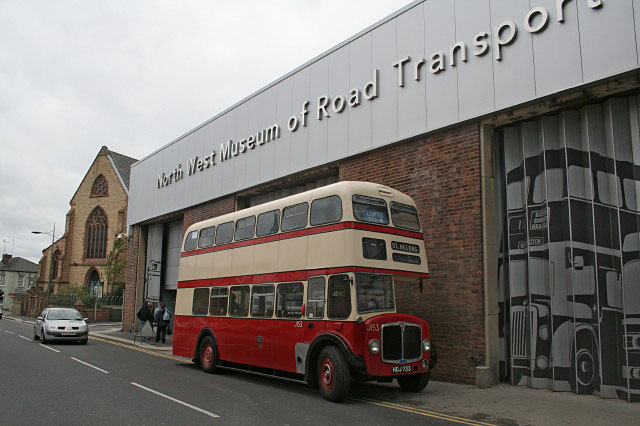
- Established: 1981 (founded); 1991 (opened)
- Location: The Old Bus Depot, Hall Street, St Helens, Merseyside WA10 1DU; United Kingdom
- Type: Transport museum
- Collection size: Buses, other vehicles, ticketing machines
- Website: North West Museum of Road Transport

The North West Museum of Road Transport (formerly St. Helens Transport Museum or St. Helens Bus Museum) is located at the old St. Helens Corporation Transport bus depot in Hall Street, St Helens, Merseyside, England.

== History ==
The museum is based in a depot which was originally constructed in 1881 for use with the city's horse-drawn trams. The building continued to be used for public transport in the city, moving to electric trams, trolleybuses, and later buses until it was closed in 1985. The building was then obtained by the museum, but it was closed in 1994 due to the poor state of the building.

The museum reopened in September 2006 after a £1 million restoration. The museum has attracted over 30,000 visitors since its reopening.

== Collections ==
The collection of vehicles at the museum includes many examples of buses from local municipal bus companies, including St Helens, Liverpool, Southport, Widnes, Warrington and Chester, as well as vehicles from the former Merseyside Passenger Transport Executive. Whilst the majority of vehicles on display are buses, there are also classic cars, trucks and fire engines, with a total of over 60 vehicles on display.

A substantial new attraction, The Museum of Fare Collection (the only specialist ticketing museum, archive and workshop in the country) commenced during 2009 and shows a worldwide collection of over 1000 ticket machines dating from as early as 1886. Visitors are invited to try these out under supervision.

== See also ==
- History of St Helens, Merseyside
- Transport in St Helens
- Trolleybuses in St Helens
