= Oliver Heywood (minister) =

British nonconformist minister (1630–1702)

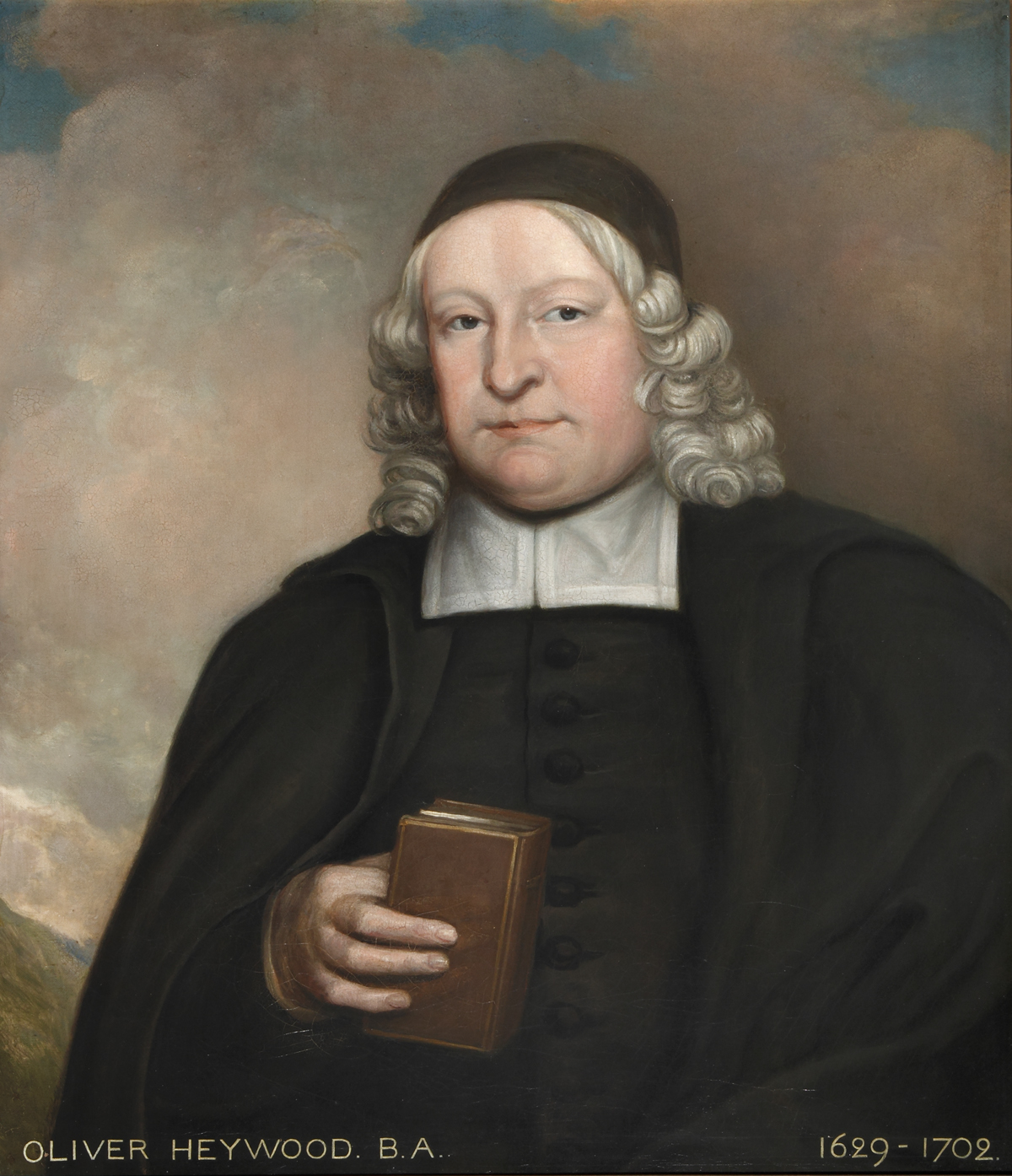
Oliver Heywood

Oliver Heywood (1630–1702) was a British nonconformist minister, ejected for his beliefs.

== Biography ==
=== Early life and education ===
Oliver Heywood, third son of Richard Heywood, yeoman, by his first wife, Alice Critchlaw, was born at Little Lever, near Bolton, Lancashire, in March 1630, and baptised (without the sign of the cross) at Bolton Parish Church on 15 March. His parents were strong puritans. After passing through Bolton Grammar School and other schools, he was admitted at Trinity College, Cambridge, on 12 June 1647, his tutor being Akehurst, who afterwards became a quaker.

In religious matters he was much influenced by the preaching of Samuel Hammond and joined with other students in a kind of religious club which met in the "garret-chamber" of Thomas Jollie. In 1650 he graduated Bachelor of Arts and soon began to preach; his first sermon was delivered at a village near to Preston, Lancashire. By his uncle, Francis Critchlaw, he was recommended as preacher at Coley Chapel, near the village of Northowram, in the parish of Halifax in the West Riding. He accepted this post, with a stipend of £30, on 26 November 1650, and refused an offer of Houghton Chapel, Lancashire. Though under the regular age, he was ordained on 4 August 1652 at Bury, Lancashire, by the second presbyterian classis of that county. His younger brother, Nathaniel, was minister at Illingworth Chapel, in the same parish of Halifax, and the two lived together in 1654 at Godley House.

Heywood removed to Northowram on his marriage in 1655. For many years before his settlement there had been no administration of Communion at Coley; he restored a monthly celebration in 1655, connecting it in 1657 with the introduction of church discipline in the presbyterian way. Hitherto his parishioners had been united in attachment to his ministry; the discipline divided them, and 'sincere Christians' became his 'greatest trouble;' his communion list reached seventy-three names. He persevered against opposition, declining calls to one of the two churches of St. Martin, York, and to the vicarage of Preston.

=== Silenced ===
Heywood was a royalist presbyterian, and though he took no part in the insurrection under George Booth, 1st Baron Delamer, he disobeyed the order requiring a public thanksgiving for its suppression, and was accordingly apprehended and threatened with sequestration in August 1659. On the news that Monck had declared for the king, he breaks out in his diary into a psalm of praise. With the Restoration, however, his serious troubles began. Richard Hooke, the new vicar of Halifax, prohibited baptism in the outlying chapelries. Heywood continued to baptise, making his peace by sending the customary perquisites to the vicar. On 23 January 1661 his 'private fast' was stopped by authority. Among his parishioners an influential party, headed by Stephen Ellis of Hipperholme, the man of most substance in the chapelry, was in favour of the resumption of the prayer-book. A copy was accordingly laid on the pulpit cushion on 25 August 1661. Heywood quietly set it aside. At the instigation of Ellis, Heywood was cited to York on 13 September, after several hearings his suspension from ministering in the diocese of York was published on 29 June 1662 in Halifax Church. For two or three Sundays he persisted in preaching; within a month of the taking effect of the Act of Uniformity 1662 (24 August 1662) he was excommunicated, the sentence of excommunication being publicly read in Halifax Church on 2 November, in the parish church of Bolton, Lancashire, on 4 January 1663, and again at Halifax on 3 December 1663. Hence attempts were made to exclude him from churches, even as a hearer; while, on the other hand, Ellis, as churchwarden, claimed fines for his non-attendance at Coley Chapel, under the statute of Elizabeth. John Angier, his father-in-law, admitted him to the communion at Denton Chapel, Lancashire; on 5 June 1664 he preached, by the vicar's invitation, in the parish church of Mottram-in-Longdendale, Cheshire; and on 13 August 1665 he preached at Shadwell Chapel, near Leeds, Hardcastle, the minister, being then in prison for nonconformity.

=== Roving ministry ===
Though according to law a 'silenced' minister, Heywood persistently held conventicles at the houses of the presbyterian gentry and farmers, in open defiance of the Conventicle Act 1664. On the passing of the Five Mile Act 1665 he left his residence (at that time Coley Hall), but only to become an itinerant evangelist throughout the northern counties. It was his opinion that this act, by carrying the ejected ministers into new localities, promoted rather than hindered the nonconformist cause. Taking advantage of his successor's absence, he preached at Coley Chapel on the first Sunday of 1668 to 'a very great assembly;' his appearances in the pulpits of parish churches were frequent at this time. At length, on 13 March 1670, he was apprehended after preaching at Little Woodhouse, near Leeds, but was released two days after. His goods, however, were seized (13 July) to meet the fine under the new Conventicle Act, which came into force on 10 May. Under the royal indulgence of 1672 he took out two licences as a presbyterian 'teacher,' one (20 April) for his own house at Northowram, the other (25 July) for the house of John Butterworth at Warley in the parish of Halifax. Over a hundred of his former parishioners entered with him (12 June) into a church covenant void of presbyterian peculiarities, and hence joined (18 June) by the members of a congregational church gathered at Sowerby Chapel in Halifax parish, by Henry Root (d 20 October 1669).

On 29 October 1672 he took part in the first ordination by presbyterians of the north since the Restoration, held in Deansgate, Manchester, at the house of Robert Eaton, an ejected divine, afterwards minister of Stand, Lancashire. When the licences were recalled (February 1675) Heywood resumed his itinerant labours. He is said in a single year to have travelled 1,400 miles, preached 105 times, besides Sunday duty, and kept fifty fast days and nine of thanksgiving. He assisted in the first presbyterian ordination in Yorkshire, at Richard Mitchel's house in Craven, on 8 July 1678. On 16 January 1685 he was convicted at the Wakefield sessions for 'a riotous assembly' in his house. Refusing to pay a fine of £50, and to give sureties for good behaviour, he was imprisoned in York Castle until the end of the year. He approved of James's declaration (1687) for liberty of conscience, and at once set about building a meeting house at Northowram (opened 8 July 1688), to which he subsequently added a school. The first master was David Hartley (appointed 5 October 1693), father of David Hartley the philosopher. His meeting house was licensed under the Toleration Act on 18 July 1689.

Heywood was one of the many nonconformist divines who attended solemn fasts (September 1689) in connection with the case of Richard Dugdale, known as the 'Surey demoniac.' It is clear that he originally believed in the reality of Dugdale's possession, yet in the subsequent defence of the ministers concerned he took no part.

=== "Happy union" ===
The London agreement (1691) between the presbyterians and congregationalists, known as the "happy union", was introduced into Yorkshire mainly through Heywood's influence. On 2 September 1691 he preached in Mrs Kirby's house at Wakefield to 20 ordained and four licensed preachers of the two denominations and the "heads of agreement" were adopted. The meeting was the first of a series of assemblies of nonconformist divines of the West Riding at which preaching licences were granted and ordinations arranged.

=== Death ===
The last ten years of Heywood's life were somewhat troubled by symptoms of declining orthodoxy in some of his coadjutors. Although some supporters such as ironmaster William and Anna Cotton did not allow the Cotton children to be baptised until after Heywood died. Heywood maintained his own evangelistic work till the close of 1699. In 1700 his health broke; asthma confined him to Northowram. From 5 December 1701 he was carried to his meeting house in a chair. He died at Northowram on Monday, 4 May 1702, and was buried in a side chapel of Halifax Church, known as 'Holdsworth's works,' in his mother's grave. There is no monument there to his memory, but in Northgate End Chapel, Halifax, is a memorial slab erected by a descendant.

== Family ==
He married, first, on 24 April 1655, at Denton, Elizabeth (d 26 May 1661, aged 27), daughter of John Angier, by whom he had three sons:

- John, born 18 April 1656, minister at Rotherham and Pontefract, died 6 September 1704;
- Eliezer, born 18 April 1657, minister at Wallingwells, Nottinghamshire and Dronfield, Derbyshire, died 20 May 1730;
- Nathaniel, born 7 August and died 24 August 1659.

Heywood married, secondly, on 27 June 1667, at Salford, Abigail, daughter of James Crompton of Breightmet in the parish of Bolton, Lancashire; she died without issue in 1707.

== Publications ==
Heywood's Works were collected by Richard Slate (1825–27, 5 vols); the collection is complete with the exception of one or two prefaces from his pen.

Among his best publications are:

1. Heart Treasure &c., 1667, 2nd part, 1672
2. Closet Prayer &c., 1671
3. Life in God's Favour &c., 1679
4. Baptismal Bonds Renewed &c., 1687
5. The Best Entail &c., 1693
6. A Family Altar &c., 1693
7. A Treatise of Christ's Intercession &c., Leeds, 1701

Most of his books are on topics of practical religion, and he sent them out in large quantities among his friends for free distribution. For his inner life the best authority is the series of his 'Diaries,' edited, with other papers, by J. Horsfall Turner, Brighouse, 1881–85, 4 vols. His registers of baptisms, marriages and deaths, edited, with those of his successor, Thomas Dickenson, by J. Horsfall Turner, under the title of The Nonconformist Register, Brighouse, 1881, are of great biographical value.
