= Thomas Raffles =

English Congregational minister

Reverend Thomas Raffles
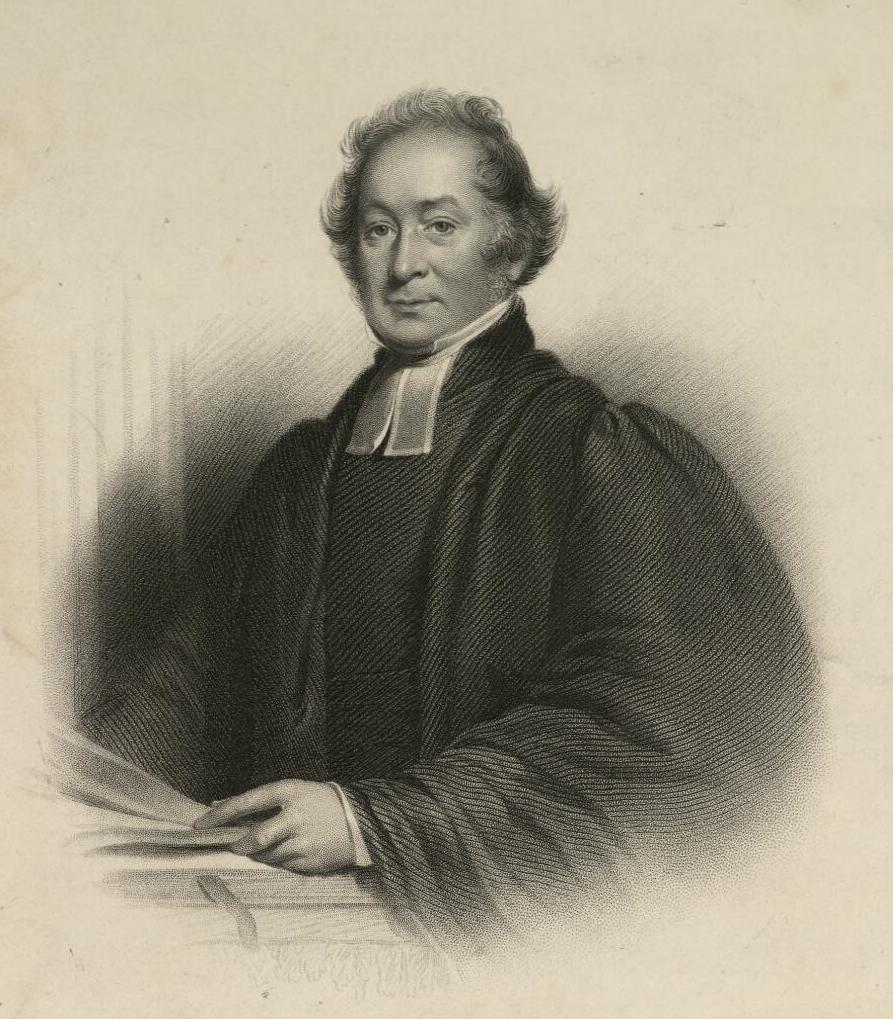
- Born: May 17, 1788; Spitalfields, Middlesex, England
- Died: August 18, 1863 (aged 75); Liverpool, Lancashire
- Education: Independent College, Homerton
- Occupation: Congregational minister
- Known for: Founder of Lancashire Independent College
- Spouse: Mary Catherine Hargreaves
- Relatives: Stamford Raffles
- Religion: Congregationalism
- Ordained: 22 June 1809

Thomas Raffles (17 May 1788 – 18 August 1863) was an English Congregational minister, known as a dominant nonconformist figure at the Great George Street Congregational Church in Liverpool, and as an abolitionist and historian.

== Early life ==
The only son of William Raffles (died 9 November 1825), a solicitor, he was born in Princes Street, Spitalfields, London, on 17 May 1788; he was first cousin to Stamford Raffles. His mother was a Wesleyan Methodist, and he became one at ten years of age. In 1800 he was sent to a boarding-school in Peckham, kept by a Baptist minister, and among his schoolfellows was his lifelong friend Richard Slate the biographer. While there he joined the congregation of William Bengo' Collyer. For some months in 1803 he was employed as a clerk at Doctors' Commons, but returned to Peckham (October 1803) to prepare for the ministry.

Raffles studied at Homerton College (1805–9) under John Pye Smith, was thought to show early promise as a preacher, and after declining a call to Hanover Street Chapel, went to George Yard Chapel, Hammersmith; he was ordained at Kensington Chapel on 22 June 1809. On the sudden death (5 August 1811) of Thomas Spencer, minister of Newington Chapel, Liverpool, Raffles was invited to succeed him. He preached at Liverpool in November 1811, accepted the call on 11 January 1812, began his ministry on 19 April, and was "set apart" on 28 May, the congregation having moved the day before to a new chapel in Great George Street.

== Liverpool ministry ==
The prominent ministry of Raffles in Liverpool lasted till 24 February 1862—he avoided politics, though he had liberal principles. He received the degree of LL.D. from Marischal College, Aberdeen, on 22 December 1820, when his testimonials were signed by the Dukes of Sussex and Somerset; and in July 1830 the degree of D.D. from Union College, U.S.A.

In September 1833 Raffles declined an invitation to succeed Rowland Hill at Surrey Chapel in London. He was chairman of the Congregational Union of England and Wales in 1839. On 19 February 1840 his chapel in Great George Street was destroyed by fire. A new chapel on the same site was opened on 21 October. In the pulpit he wore cassock, gown, and bands.

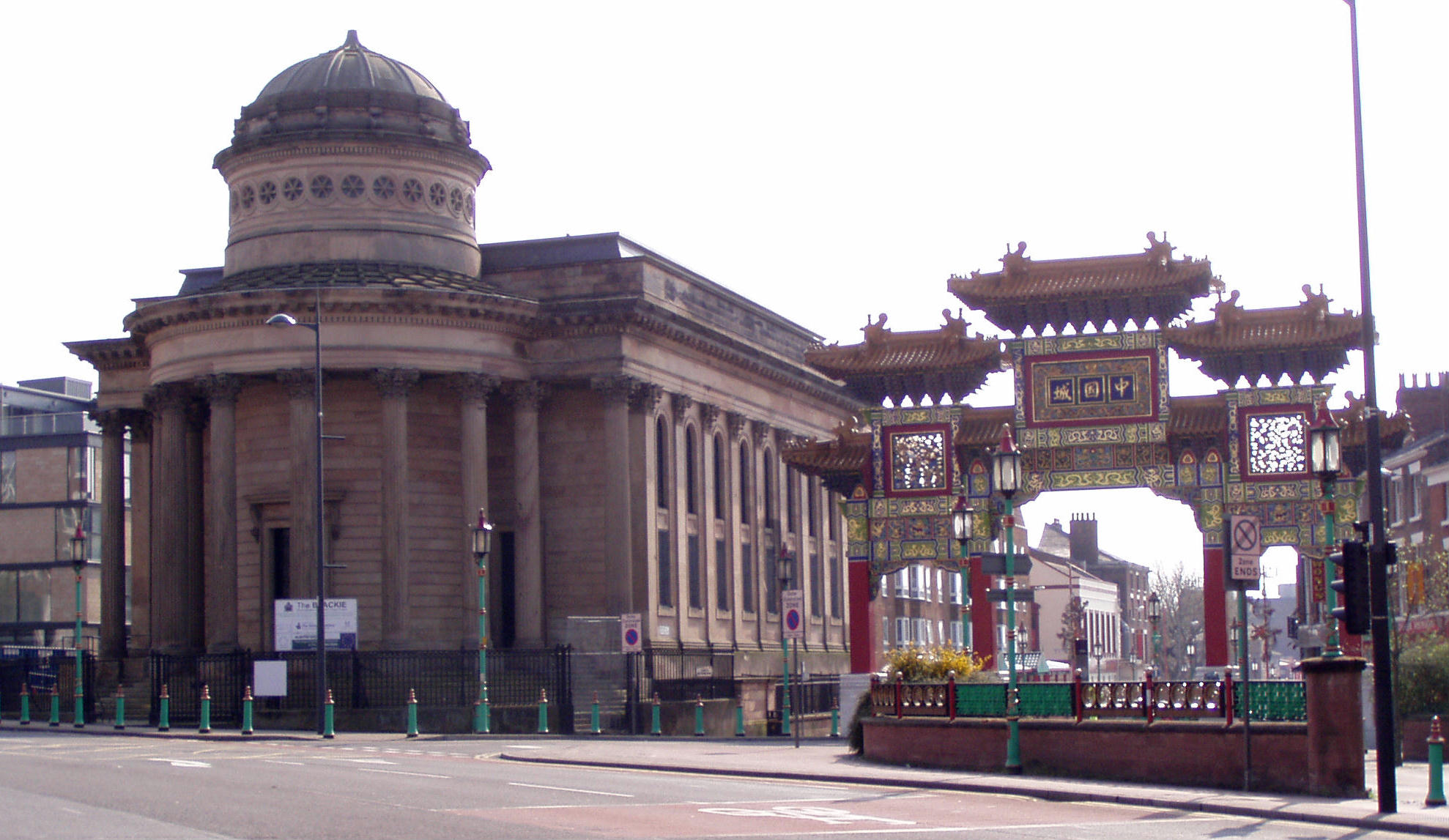
Great George Street Congregational Church, Liverpool today

== Lancashire Independent College ==
With George Hadfield, Raffles was one of the main founders in 1816 of Blackburn Academy for the education of Independent ministers, where Joseph Fletcher was the first theological tutor. The move of the institution to Manchester, as the Lancashire Independent College, was largely due to Raffles. From March 1839 till his death he was chairman of the education committee, and raised a large part of the money for the existing college buildings at Whalley Range, near Manchester, opened on 26 April 1843.

The first professor of biblical criticism at the College was Samuel Davidson, the author of the second volume in the tenth edition, 1856, of the Introduction to the Critical Study and Knowledge of the Holy Scriptures by Thomas Hartwell Horne. In the controversy raised by this publication, which produced Davidson's resignation in 1858, Raffles took the conservative side. On 20 June 1861 his services to the college were acknowledged by the foundation of the Raffles scholarship and the Raffles library.

== Death ==
Raffles died on 18 August 1863. He was buried on 24 August in the Liverpool Necropolis, Liverpool.

== Works ==
Raffles published:

- Memoirs … of Thomas Spencer, Liverpool, 1813; seven editions, besides several in America.
- Poems by Three Friends, 1813 (anon.); 2nd edit. 1815, gives the names James Baldwin Brown the elder and Jeremiah Holmes Wiffen.
- Klopstock's "The Messiah" … the Five last Books prepared for the Press, 1814 (dedicated to Queen Charlotte); 1815, 3 vols.
- Letters during a Tour through … France, Savoy, Liverpool, 1818; five editions, besides American reprints.
- Lectures on … Practical Religion, Liverpool, 1820.
- Lectures on … Doctrines of the Gospel, Liverpool, 1822.
- Hear the Church! a Word for All. By a Doctor of Divinity but not of Oxford, 1839, (anon.), ascribed to Raffles.
- Internal Evidences of the … Inspiration of Scripture, 1849; 1864.
- Independency at St. Helen's, Liverpool, 1856. Posthumous was
- Hymns … for the New Year's Morning Prayer Meeting’ Liverpool, 1868 (edited by James Baldwin Brown the younger).

Raffles edited an enlarged edition, 1815 2 vols. (reprinted 1825), of the Self-interpreting Bible, by John Brown; and was one of the editors of the Investigator, a short-lived London quarterly started in 1820. He contributed eight hymns to William Bengo' Collyer's Hymns, 1812; these, with 38 others, were included in his own Supplement to Dr. Watts, 1853. John D. Julian annotates 16 of his hymns in common use.

As a historian of nonconformity, Raffles collected related original documents, of which use was made by Robert Halley, and to some extent by Nightingale. These manuscripts went the library of the Lancashire Independent College. He was a major collector also of autographs, of all kinds, leaving 87 volumes of them.

== Family ==
Raffles married, on 18 April 1815, Mary Catherine (born 31 July 1796, died 17 May 1843), only daughter of James Hargreaves of Liverpool. He had three sons and a daughter; his eldest son and biographer Thomas Stamford Raffles served as stipendiary magistrate of Liverpool.

== Bibliography ==
Attribution This article incorporates text from a publication now in the public domain: Lee, Sidney, ed. (1896). "Raffles, Thomas (1788-1863)". Dictionary of National Biography. Vol. 47. London: Smith, Elder & Co.
