= Henry Newcome =

English nonconformist preacher and activist

Henry Newcome (November 1627 – 17 September 1695) was an English nonconformist preacher and activist.

== Early life ==
Henry Newcome was born at Caldecote, Huntingdonshire, the fourth son of Stephen Newcome, rector of Caldecote.

He was baptised on 27 November 1627. His mother was Rose, daughter of Henry Williamson (a native of Salford and the rector of Conington, Cambridgeshire) and granddaughter of Thomas Sparke, one of the puritan divines at the Hampton Court conference in 1604. Henry was orphaned in his teens; his parents were buried in the same coffin on 4 February 1642. He was educated by his eldest brother, Robert, who succeeded their father as rector of Caldecote. In May 1644 Henry was admitted to St John's College, Cambridge. The English Civil War interrupted his studies, which were resumed on 10 May 1645. He graduated B.A. on 2 February 1648, and M.A. on 1 July 1651.

== Career ==
On 24 September 1647, he became schoolmaster at Congleton, Cheshire, and soon began to preach. He was already married when, on 22 August 1648, he received Presbyterian ordination at Sandbach, Cheshire. He was due to move to Alvanley Chapel, in the parish of Frodsham, Cheshire; but in October 1648 he received a unanimous call to the perpetual curacy of St Luke's Church, Goostrey, Cheshire, through the interest of his wife's cousin, Henry Manwaring of Kermincham, in whose house he subsequently lived. He began his duties at Goostrey on 23 November 1648, but Manwaring's interest soon obtained for him the rectory of Gawsworth, Cheshire, to which he moved on 8 April 1650. On 25 December he subscribed the engagement of fidelity to the existing government, much against the grain, for he was always a royalist. He had already taken the Solemn League and Covenant. He was closely associated with the religious work of John Machin. In October 1653 he joined Adam Martindale in the establishment of a clerical union for Cheshire on the model of Richard Baxter's Worcestershire agreement.

On the death of Richard Hollinworth, Newcome was elected (5 December 1656) one of the preachers at the collegiate church of Manchester. After much hesitation he settled in Manchester on 23 April 1657. He served at Manchester for the rest of his life. His ministry was exceedingly popular. He became a member of the first presbyterian classis of Lancashire, attending for the first time on 12 May 1657. He sat as delegate in the Lancashire provincial assembly in 1658 and 1659. His Presbyterianism was not of a severe type; and he entered warmly into the abortive proposals for an accommodation with independents formulated at Manchester on 13 July 1659.

Newcome was deeply involved in the preparations for a royalist rising (5 August 1659) under George Booth, 1st Baron Delamer. After the rout near Northwich (19 August), Robert Lilburne put Henry Root the independent into Newcome's pulpit (25 August), and he expected to be deposed, but his work was only interrupted for one Sunday. As early as 6 May 1660 he publicly prayed for the king "by periphrasis." He conducted a religious service as preliminary to the proclamation of the king at Manchester on Saturday, 12 May. His thanksgiving sermon (24 May) produced a great impression; it was published with the title Usurpation Defeated and David Restored.

== Loss of clerical post ==
The English Restoration led to the loss of his post at Manchester. The constitution of Manchester collegiate church, which had been created in 1635 and subverted in 1645, was restored, and three new fellows were installed on 17 September 1660. Great efforts were made to retain Newcome and a petition from 444 parishioners was backed by a testimonial signed among others by Sir George Booth and Henry Bridgeman. On 21 Sept. Charles II added his name to the list from which fellows were to be chosen, but it was too late. The new fellows all had other preferments, so Newcome continued to preach as their deputy; his last sermon in the collegiate church was on 31 August 1662, the Sunday after the coming into force of the Uniformity Act. Suggestions were made that he should receive episcopal ordination privately, but he declined this idea.

== Nonconformist preaching ==
He remained in Manchester till the Five Mile Act 1665 came into force (25 March 1666), and then moved to Ellenbrook, in Worsley parish, Lancashire. At this time he travelled about a good deal, making three visits to London. In June 1670 he visited Dublin, and received a call (25 July) to succeed Edward Baynes at Wine Tavern Street meeting house, which he declined. On 15 Oct. 1670 he returned to Manchester, preached in private houses, and was fined for so doing. He took out a licence (21 April) under the indulgence of 1672, and preached publicly, first in his own house, and then in a licensed barn (at Cold House, near Shudehill) after evening church hours. These services were interrupted in 1674 and discontinued in 1676, but he remained in Manchester, performing such private ministrations as he could. In February 1677 he was offered a chaplaincy to the widowed Countess of Donegall; he stayed five weeks at her house in London, but declined the situation. On the appearance (4 April 1687) of James's declaration for liberty of conscience, he preached publicly, first in a vacant house, then (from 12 June) in Thomas Stockton's barn, which was speedily enlarged, and opened (31 July) for worship "in the public time." He took his turn monthly at Hilton's lecture at Bolton, Lancashire. On 7 August, John Chorlton was engaged as his assistant.

A number of nonconformist ministers waited for James II at Rowton Heath on 27 August; Newcome as senior was expected to address the king; he delegated this to Thomas Jollie, but James gave no opportunity for any address. The windows of the barn meeting-house were broken (30 November) by Sir John Bland. In April 1693 a new meeting-house was projected, but Newcome was doubtful of the success of the scheme. Ground was bought on 20 June at Plungen's Meadow (now Cross Street); the building was begun on 18 July, a gallery was added as a private speculation by agreement dated 12 Feb. 1694, and the meeting-house was opened by Newcome on 24 June 1694. It was wrecked by a Jacobite mob in June 1715. It was rebuilt and enlarged, eventually becoming the Cross Street Chapel. Much of the original structure remained until it was destroyed in a World War II air raid.

By this time Newcome had abandoned his Presbyterianism, and entered into a ministerial alliance on the basis of the London union of 1690, dropping the terms presbyterian and congregational. A union of this kind was projected in Lancashire in 1692. Newcome was moderator of "a general meeting of ministers of the United Bretheren" at Bolton, Lancashire, on 3 April 1693. He was appointed with Thomas Jollie on 4 September 1694 "to manage the correspondence" for the county. This was his last public work; he preached only occasionally at his new chapel, delivering his last sermon there on 13 June 1695.

== Death ==
He died at Manchester on 17 September 1695, and was buried three days later near the pulpit in his chapel, with Chorlton preaching the funeral sermon. His inscribed tombstone is in the floor of the east aisle. His portrait, finished 15 Sept, 1658 by "Mr. Cunney," was engraved by R. White, and again by John Bull (1825); Baker has a poor woodcut from it. The original was at the Lancashire Independent College, Whalley Range, near Manchester.

== Family ==
He married, on 6 July 1648, Elizabeth Manwaring (1626–1700) of Smallwood, Cheshire. They had five children;

- Rose, born on 24 April 1649 and buried 4 May 1719, unmarried
- Henry, born 28 May 1650 (see below)
- Daniel, born on 29 Oct. 1652 and died 9 Feb. 1684; he was twice married and left children
- Elizabeth, born on 11 April 1655, died unmarried
- Peter, born 5 November 1656 (see below)

=== Henry Newcome (son) ===
Newcome's eldest son, Henry (1650–1713), was born at Gawsworth rectory on 28 May 1650. He was admitted at St Edmund Hall, Oxford, on 23 March 1667, became curate at Shelsley, Worcestershire, in January 1672: rector of Tattenhall, Cheshire, 29 July 1675; and rector of Middleton, Lancashire, towards the end of 1701. He married in April 1677, and had a son (Henry) and three daughters. He published single sermons, 1689-1712. He died in June 1713.

=== Peter Newcome ===
Newcome's third son, Peter (1656–1738), was born at Gawsworth rectory on 5 November 1656. He was admitted at Magdalene College, Cambridge, in 1673, moved to St Edmund Hall, Oxford, in April 1675, then moved to Brasenose College, Oxford, a few months later, and graduated M.A. in June 1680. He became curate at Crookham, Hampshire, in March 1680; vicar of Aldenham, Hertfordshire, in September 1683; and vicar of Hackney, Middlesex, in September 1703. He died on 5 October 1738. He married (1681) Ann, daughter of Eustace Hook, and had twelve children, of whom six survived him. He published A Catechetical Course of Sermons in 1702, 2 vols., and single sermons (1705–37). His portrait was engraved by George Vertue.

== Works ==
Newcome's major work is his Diary (begun 10 July 1646), of which a portion (30 Sept. 1661 – 29 Sept. 1663) was edited (1849) by Thomas Heywood for the Chetham Society.

His Autobiography, an abstract of the Diary, to 3 September 1695, was edited (1852, 2 vols.) for the same society by Richard Parkinson, with a family memoir (written 1846) by Thomas Newcome. Newcome had started to write his autobiography, but due to ill health, it was completed by his son.

He also published;

- In The Censures of the Church Revived, &c., 1659, the section headed A True and Perfect Narrative, &c., is by Newcome; it gives extracts from the original records of the first presbyterian classis of Lancashire, which supply a few points omitted in the existing minutes.
- His Faithful Narration of the life of John Machin was finished in February 1665, and published anonymously in 1671, with prefatory epistle by Sir Charles Wolseley.
- He revised the Narrative (1685) of the life of John Angier by Oliver Heywood
- The Sinner's Hope, 1660.
- Usurpation Defeated, 1660.
- An Help to the Duty in ... Sickness, 1685.
- A Plain Discourse about ... Anger, 1693.
- Edmund Calamy mentions without date a sermon on The Covenant of Grace
- In Slate's Select Nonconformists' Remains, 1814, are sermons by Newcome from his manuscripts.

== Sources ==
This article incorporates text from a publication now in the public domain: Gordon, Alexander (1894). "Newcome, Henry". In Lee, Sidney (ed.). Dictionary of National Biography. Vol. 40. London: Smith, Elder & Co.

- (Note: references prefixed with "via DNB" are in the original DNB article and have not been independently verified.)
- via DNB:Newcome's Autobiography, 1852 (Chetham Society)
- via DNB:Newcome's Diary, 1849 (Chetham Society)
- via DNB:Funeral Sermon by Chorlton, 1696
- via DNB:Calamy's Account, 1713, pp. 391 sq.
- via DNB:Calamy's Continuation, 1727, i. 556
- via DNB:Robert Halley, Lancashire, 1869;
- via DNB:Baker's Memorials of a Dissenting Chapel, 1884, pp. xv sq., 2 sq., 136 sq.
- via DNB:Minutes of Manchester Presbyterian Classis, 1891, ii. 260 sq., iii. 350 sq. (Chetham Society)
- via DNB:Nightingale's Lancashire Nonconformity, 1893, v. 81 sq.
- via DNB:Addit. MS. 24485 (extracts from Jollie's church-book)
- via DNB:Drysdale's History of the Presbyterians in England
