= Anna Cotton =

English nonconformist and ironmaster (died 1721)

- Born: Anna Welby
- Died: 1721
- Known for: running an iron business and family empire
- Spouse: William Cotton
- Children: William Westby Cotton

Anna Cotton or Anna Welby (died 1721) was an English nonconformist and ironmaster. She was the second wife of William Cotton who was an ironmaster. She took control of his business and became a matriarch head of his family after he died.

== Life ==
Cotton was born in the 1600s and she became the second wife of William Cotton who was an ironmaster in south Yorkshire on 7 March 1683. William had eleven children by his first wife, Eleanor. William and Eleanor, and later Anna became followers of the Reverend Oliver Heywood who was a nonconformist minister. Anna had a son William Westby Cotton who was baptised in 1689.

On 6 May 1703 her husband died and she and her brother-in-law, Daniel Cotton, had to look after the four surviving children. Her husband's empire was being encroached by his former partner John Spencer of Cannon Hall who was known for taking advantage of partners who died. It fell upon Anna to defend their possessions and rights. Her children made marriages that consolidated the family's position. The eldest daughter Frances was married to William Vernon who looked after their Warmingham forge and the second daughter, Anna, married Edward Kendall who co-managed the Staffordshire works. Her son William (Westby Cotton) was married to his first cousin Anna Cotton whose father was Daniel Cotton. In 1716 Anna started to retire and she transferred her control of the Colne bridge forge to her son William. She told John Spencer but he appears to have taken little notice as they had to remind him of £600 owed to them and for not receiving the May 1717 accounts.

Reverend Thomas Dickinson of Darton, who was the Reverend Oliver Heywood's replacement, records her death as 8 July 1721 at Stourbridge. She was buried at Darton on 13 July. After her death the Cotton family continued their iron based empire.
