= Trolleybuses in St Helens =

St Helens trolleybus system
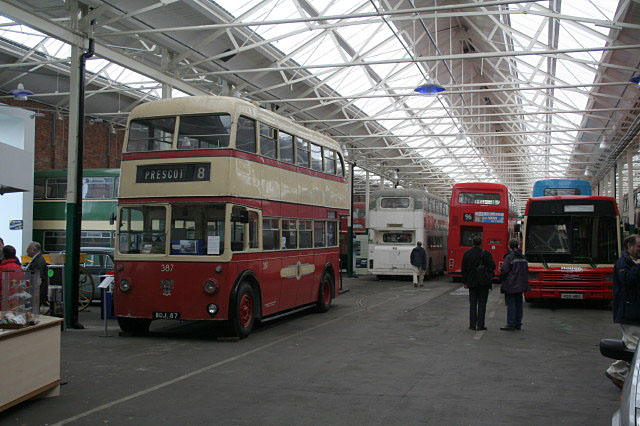
- The last remaining St Helens trolleybus at the North West Museum of Road Transport, the redeveloped former St Helens Corporation tram depot, Hall Street, October 2008

Operation
- Locale: St Helens, Merseyside, England
- Open: 11 July 1927
- Close: 30 June 1958
- Status: Closed
- Routes: 6
- Operator: St Helens Corporation Transport

Infrastructure
- Stock: 66 (maximum)

The St Helens trolleybus system once served St Helens, Merseyside, north west England. Opened on 11 July 1927, it gradually replaced the St Helens tramway network.

By the standards of the various now-defunct trolleybus systems in the United Kingdom, the St Helens system was a medium-sized one, with a total of six routes, and a maximum fleet of 66 trolleybuses. It was closed relatively early, on 30 June 1958. The 16 youngest trolleybuses in the fleet at that time, ones built in 1950–51, were all sold to other systems for further use. Eight Sunbeam vehicles went to South Shields system and eight British United Traction vehicles to Bradford.

Only one of the former St Helens system trolleybuses is now preserved, at the Trolleybus Museum at Sandtoft, South Yorkshire.

== See also ==
- History of St Helens, Merseyside
- Transport in St Helens
- List of trolleybus systems in the United Kingdom
