= Thomas Spencer (minister) =

English Congregational minister (1791–1811)

Thomas Spencer (1791–1811) was an English Congregational minister.

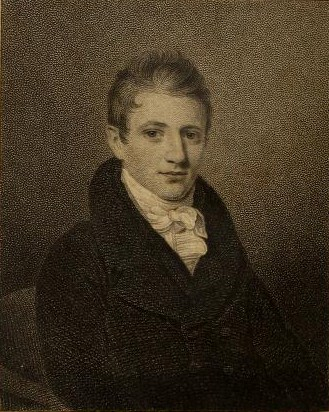
Thomas Spencer

== Life ==
The second son of a worsted-weaver, Spencer was born at Hertford on 21 January 1791, and lost his mother at the age of five. He had to leave school and help his father in his business when 13; about 18 months later he was apprenticed for a short time to a glover in The Poultry, in the City of London. While here he was introduced to Thomas Wilson, treasurer of the Hoxton Dissenters' Training College for Ministers. He was admitted there in January 1807, after a year's preparation at Harwich, during which he studied Hebrew, and made an abridgment of John Parkhurst's Hebrew Lexicon.

In June 1807 Spencer first preached in public at Collier's End, near Hertford, at age 16; and was invited to preach in the neighbouring villages and at Hertford. When barely 17 he was allowed to appear in the pulpit at Hoxton, against the rules. He became a popular preacher in the neighbourhood of London, and in December 1808 preached at Lady Huntingdon's chapel at Brighton. On 10 January 1809 he addressed large congregation from Rowland Hill's pulpit in Surrey Chapel, Southwark.

Having visited Liverpool in the summer of 1810, Spencer on 26 September accepted an offer of the pastorate of Newington chapel there. He entered on his duties in February 1811, and on 27 June was ordained in the chapel in Byrom Street. At first he preached from 65 to 75 minutes; later, under medical advice, he limited his discourses to three-quarters of an hour. A new chapel, with accommodation for 2,000 people, was built for him, with the foundation-stone laid on 15 April.

Spencer drowned while bathing near the Herculaneum Pottery on 5 August 1811, and was buried on the 13th at Liverpool. Many funeral sermons and elegies were published. An elegy by James Montgomery was appended to the Memoirs of Spencer written by his successor at Liverpool, Thomas Raffles. An engraving by Blood, accompanied four Poems (1811) on his death by Ellen Robinson.

== Works ==
Twenty-one Sermons by Spencer was published by the Religious Tract Society in 1829, another edition following in 1830. An American edition, with introduction by Alfred S. Patton, appeared in 1856. A volume of his tracts was published in 1853.

== Notes ==
Attribution

This article incorporates text from a publication now in the public domain: Lee, Sidney, ed. (1898). "Spencer, Thomas (1791-1811)". Dictionary of National Biography. Vol. 53. London: Smith, Elder & Co.
