= History of St Helens, Merseyside =

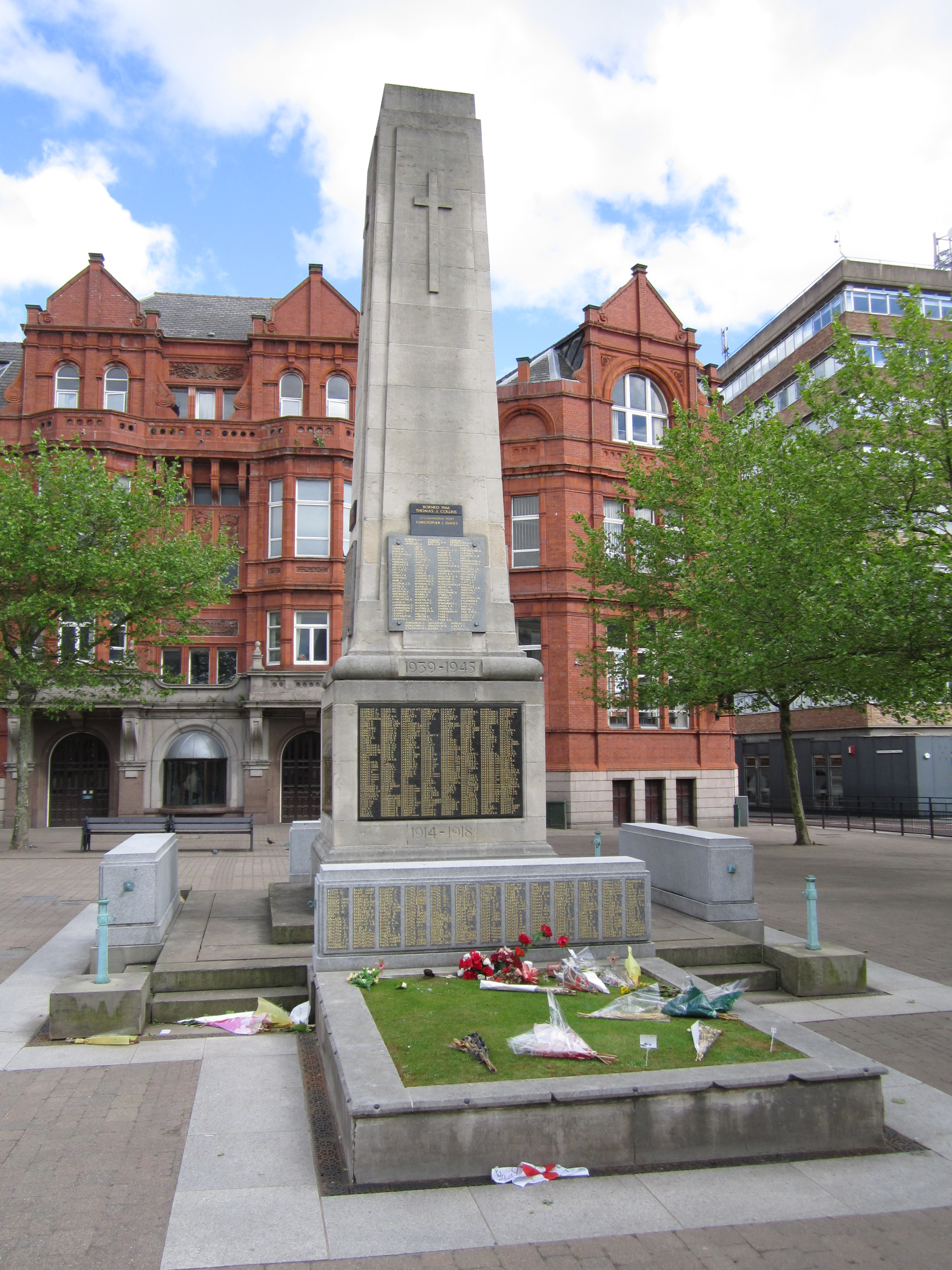
Cenotaph in St Helens, commemorating its war dead

St Helens is a large town and the administrative seat of the Metropolitan Borough of St Helens in Merseyside, England. The town was incorporated as a municipal borough in 1868, responsible for the administration of the four townships and manors of Eccleston, Parr, Sutton and Windle. In 1887 this role was expanded to a county borough, which was superseded in 1974 by the larger metropolitan borough.

St Helens is in the far south west of the historic county of Lancashire in North West England, six miles (10 km) north of the River Mersey. This portion of the county was partially settled by the Celtic Brigantes who were subsequently subjugated by the Romans in the 1st Century, with nearby Wigan probably the location of the Roman settlement of Coccium. No archaeological evidence has been uncovered to tie either group specifically to the St Helens area, though Eccleston derives its name from either the Latin Ecclesia or Welsh Eglwys suggesting a link to a church, (none are formally recorded in the township until the 19th century).

The first settlements are the manors, parishes and titled lands listed in the Domesday Book ten centuries later in the 12th century that encompass the modern townships as part of their fiefdoms, though it may be inferred from tithes that the land was populated before then.

The area developed during the 18th and 19th centuries into a significant centre for coal mining, and glassmaking. Before and during this time there was a cotton and linen industry, particularly sail making, that lasted until the mid-19th century as well as salt, lime and alkali pits, copper smelting, and brewing.

The town and greater area are notable for the construction of the St Helens sections of the Sankey Canal and also the first competition for steam locomotives at the Rainhill Trials.

The borough is home to 147 listed buildings, and 12 scheduled monuments. Some of the most prominent include Windle Chantry (dating to the early 15th century), St Mary's Lowe House (known as "The Poor Man's Cathedral" due to its construction from donated funds from the working class), the red brick Gamble Institute (home to the Central Library and other local authority offices constructed in 1896), the Beechams Clock Tower (built 1877) and The Quaker Friends Meeting House. Converted for use as a meeting place by George Shaw of Bickerstaffe, in 1678, a sign at the front of the building reads "so used" since 1678, partly leading local historians to believe the building had been used for another purpose for quite a number of years before then.

== History ==
=== Formation of the Town ===
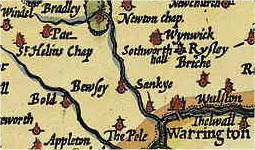
"St Helins" Chapel as recorded on a map of 1610 showing the surrounding towns and villages and the River Mersey.

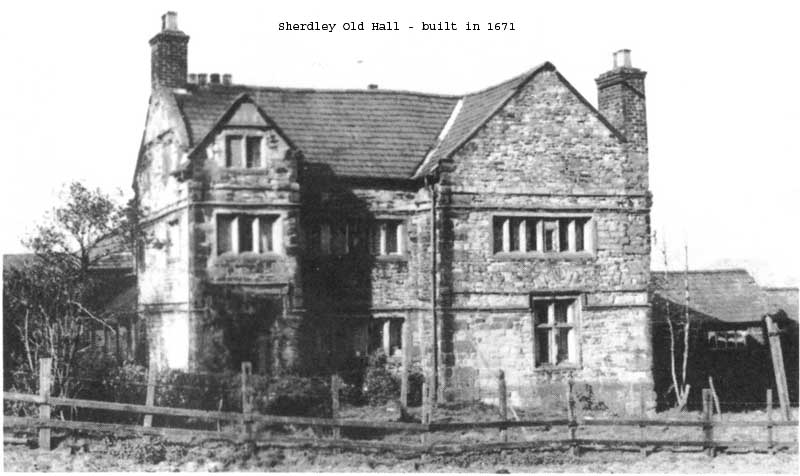
The Sherdley Old Hall farmhouse, built in 1671 in the Elizabethan style, a Grade II listed building.

An artists rendition of the Friends' Meeting House constructed in St Helens 1679, a Grade II Listed building.

St Helens did not exist as a town in its own right until the middle of the 19th century. The town had a complex evolution spurred on by rapid population growth during the Industrial Revolution. Between 1629 and 1839 St Helens grew from a small group of dwellings, surrounding the chapel, to a village centred around a larger church within a township, before becoming the significant urban centre for the four primary feudal lay manors that make up the modern town.

The origin of the name "St Helens" stretches back to a "chapel of ease" dedicated to St Elyn, the earliest reference to which is in 1552. The first time the chapel is referred to is in 1558 when Thomas Parr of Parr bequeathed money towards maintaining the chapel and finding a man of the cloth to take residence.

"[I bequeath] to a stock towards finding a priest at St. Helen's Chapel in Hardshaw, and to the maintenance of God's divine service there for ever, if the stock go forward and that the priest do service as is aforesaid".

— William Farrer quoting Thomas Parr, A History of the County of Lancaster: Volume 3

Early maps show that the chapel was on Chapel Lane, around the site of the modern, pedestrianised Church Street. Historically this was within the berewick of Hardshaw, a holding in the township of Windle entailing the southern border of that area abutting onto the open farmland of Parr to the east, and sharing boundaries with Sutton and Eccleston to the south and west respectively.

Throughout the Middle Ages the area was predominantly arable land and was noted for large swathes of moss, heath and bog land while elsewhere it was covered by the greater Mersey Forest (the larger "Community Forest" was not established until much later).

Largely flat, the elevation increased further away from the Mersey, and several small tributaries flowed to the river. The lay of the land was conducive to moving goods to the south and west respectively, towards the larger population centres of ancient Warrington and Chester, plus the rapidly growing and more influential Liverpool.

The name St Helens was not set in stone until the 19th century, and it was variously named as St Hellins, St Helins, St Hellens, St Helyns, St Elyns or variations after it was officially incorporated in 1868.

=== Lords and Earls ===
In 1139 the Peerage "Earl of Derby" was created. His lands encompassed a region from Liverpool to Manchester, and to the north beyond Lancaster and were primarily turned to meeting the pastoral needs of the people.

Norman descendant Robert De Ferrers was installed as the 1st Earl. The family held the title for 150 years before it was forfeited to Henry III's family whereupon Henry of Grosmont, 1st Duke of Lancaster and subsequently John of Gaunt, 1st Duke of Lancaster became Earl before it merged with the Crown under his son, Henry IV.

In 1485 the title was re-established and granted to the Stanley family. The Stanley ancestral home was established in Knowsley, to the west of the modern St Helens borough, with the foundation of a hunting lodge in the 15th century and Knowsley Hall in the 18th century.

=== Townships and manors ===
Windle Chantry dates back to the 15th Century, with Sir Thomas Gerard responsible for its construction on his return from Agincourt around 1415

The completion of the Domesday Book in 1086 reveals several manors existed although there are no specific references to "St Elyn", or the "vills" or villages. Windle was recorded as "Windhull" (or variations thereof) in 1201, Bold in 1212 (as Bolde) and Parr, or Parre in 1246, whilst Sutton and Ecclestone composed part of the Widnes "fee", a hereditary entitlement of ownership under a Knight or Earl. Many of the original parishes, townships and local areas are named for the families that held the land between the 11th and 18th century.

The Hospitallers held lands in Hardshaw as early as 1292. Their land was known as Crossgate, located in the vicinity of the former Cross Street in the town centre now buried beneath the College campus.

The Ecclestone family owned the Eccleston lands. Their ancestral home dates to 1100, built by Hugh Ecclestone, and lived there until the 18th century when they moved to Southport

The manor of Parr remained in control of the Parr family and their descendants throughout the 13th to the early 15th centuries when William Parr, 1st Marquess of Northampton, brother of Henry VIII's wife Catherine Parr, sold the manor to the Byroms of Lowton. The Byroms supported the Royalists during the English Civil War and Henry Byrom, son of the Lord of the Manor, died at the Battle of Edgehill.

The extensive lands of Sutton Manor stretched across open and flat land leading towards the Mersey. In 1212 William de Daresbury was the title holder of the manors. The manor's name is of unknown origin, but the land within the enlarged estate belonged to several leading families including the Elton Heads, Ravenheads, and Sherdleys. The Sherdley family trace back to the Northales who had settled in the area since 1276 when they are referred to as plaintiffs in a boundary dispute with the Lords of Rainhill.

Windle contained the Hardshaw (or antiquated Hardsheigh), described as a berewick in the Domesday Book. The Windle Family were Lords of the manor from the Norman period onward, before ceding control to the Gerards of Bryn. The Chapel of St Elyn was in Chapel Lane, Hardshaw.

"This tiny hamlet [in] Hardshaw including the chapel-of-ease, from which its name was taken, became the nucleus of the town."

— Mike Fletcher, Black Gold & Hot Sand, 2002

In 1956, construction work in the vicinity of Bridge Street / Church Street in the town centre unearthed remains of grain pounders and two ancient wells, dating back several centuries.

=== Chapel of St Elyn ===
In 1552 the chapel was noted as "consisting only of a 'challis and a lytle bell". The chapel was at the crux of the four townships of Eccleston, Parr, Sutton and Windle, and lay on the intersecting roads that served as a major thoroughfare for traffic between Lancashire towns such as Liverpool, Ormskirk, Lathom and Cheshire towns south of the River Mersey such as Warrington and Chester. The chapel was sited between the port of Liverpool, and the landlocked Lancashire townships that would become important in the development of St Helens and Wigan.

The road links are attested to by the existence of Chester Lane, the modern B5419, that originally wound through the west of the town heading south to the Mersey crossing point of Warrington and beyond to the ancient Chester Road that is part of the A56 between Chester and the Manchester townships.

As a busy thoroughfare it is suggested by historian and genealogist, William Farrer, that a village existed in the vicinity for centuries, later sharing the name of the chapel. It is known from the diaries of a local Puritan by the name of Adam Martindale, that by the time the King's Head Inn was constructed in 1629 on "the great road" between Warrington and Ormskirk, there were a number of houses, farms and manors in the area. Martindale noted that by 1618 that the original chapel had been demolished and rebuilt. A school was later built after a donation by local resident John Lyon and in 1679 the Friends Meeting House was established by George Shaw of Bickerstaffe, it is a Grade II Listed building.

=== Religious ties ===
The strong link to Roman Catholicism in the area was maintained by the Lords of Sutton Manor, the De Holland family, starting in 1321. Roger Holland was burnt at the stake for "heresy" for his professed belief in the Reformed churches in 1558, during the Marian persecutions of Queen Mary. Thomas Holland, a local Jesuit priest, was arrested and tried for high treason in October, 1642 as "taking orders by authority of the see of Rome and returning to England" which was the first step in the process of beatification by Pope Leo XIII in 1886. Ravenhead Hall was the site of a Catholic chapel during the Catholic Persecutions in the 17th and 18th century. The Lathom family and the Ecclestons maintained Rainford's close connections with Catholicism.

Windle has a connection to witches. In 1602 two women were sent to Lancaster Castle for trial, and a decade later, Isobel Roby was submitted to Sir Thomas Gerard, Lord of the Manor, accused of upsetting the ship upon which Princess Anne of Denmark was travelling. She was executed at Lancaster, along with the Pendle and Samlesbury witches, on 20 August 1612 as result of the religiously fuelled witch-hunts in the era.

=== The precedence of St Helens ===
"St Hellens" as recorded in 1818 OS.

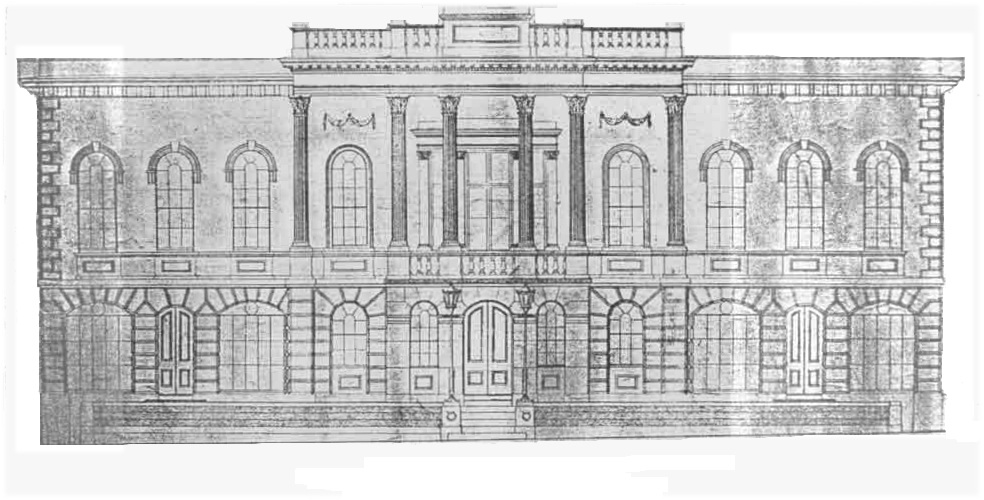
A contemporary sketch of the original Town Hall, built 1839.

A photograph believed to be of the Improvement Commissioners offices built in 1852.

A period postcard of the new (and current) Town Hall as it would have appeared in 1876.

In 1746 St Helens, composed of the area of the four townships (and their collieries) beyond Prescot, was referred to in a statement in Parliament related to the extension of the extension of the Liverpool to Prescot Turnpike.

The rapid growth of St Helens at the epicentre of the townships is attested to by several authors. The Penny Cyclopaedia states in 1839 that "Saint Helen's, Lancashire, is in the township of Windle, in the chapelry of St Helen's, Prescott parish. The township contains 3,540 acres, and had in 1831 a population of 5,825'. The town has risen into importance of late years"

In contrast by 1854, 20 years before the establishment of the Borough of St Helens, George Routledge stated a reversal of the roles, "St Helens, originally an inconsiderable village, is now a very thriving town" and later states that the town "... may be said to contain the four townships of Sutton, Parr, Windle and Eccleston".

The composition of the town described by Routledge largely mirrors those observations made by Samuel Lewis in 1848 and later still in 1874 by John Marius Wilson and John Bartholemew in 1887.

Census figures from 1801 suggest the population of the district of St Helens was 12,500 which by 1861 had reached between 37,631 and 55,523 (John Marius Wilson placing populace at the lower number, with total households at the specific figure of 6,539) in the wider area with St Helens itself comprising a population of 20,176 in 3,577 households. The Ordnance Survey of 1843 shows St Helens as the significant urban centre

The original Town Hall was constructed in 1839, and was described as "in the Italian style, with a Corinthian portico; and contains a lock-up, a news room, and a large hall for courts, concerts, balls, and public meetings". The cloistered Market Hall was constructed next to the church in 1851. The civil parish of St Helens was instituted in 1893 and was "more extensive than the town.".

In 1832 St Helens had a gas supply for lighting purposes, with street lights installed soon after. In 1845 a civil ordinance raised funds to pay for permanent maintenance of the existing streets, lighting, and paving and lighting rural and muddy lanes and avenues.

On 2 February 1868 Queen Victoria granted a Charter of Incorporation, defining St Helens as a Municipal Corporation (Borough). The first election of councillors took place on 9 May the same year, followed by the first Town Council meeting on the 18th. Twenty years later in 1887 St Helens became a County Borough granting it two representatives in Parliament.

In 1894 the Parish of St Helens was officially incorporated by the 1893 St Helens Corporation Act. This was achieved by the abolition of the civil parishes of Parr, Sutton and amalgamation of their townships. The civil parishes of Eccleston and Windle both ceded a portion of their area to St Helens.

=== St Helens, administrative centre of the Metropolitan Borough ===
The modern Borough of St Helens covers areas traditionally not associated with the town. The 1972 creation of the Metropolitan County of Merseyside appended the former urban districts of Haydock, Newton-le-Willows and Rainford, and parts of Billinge-and-Winstanley and Ashton-in-Makerfield urban districts, along with part of Whiston Rural District, all from the administrative county of Lancashire. The urban sprawl of St Helens extended to the boundaries of Haydock and Rainhill, where inhabitants may consider themselves either part of either both St Helens the 'Town' and 'Borough', or just the Borough.

== Industrial Development ==
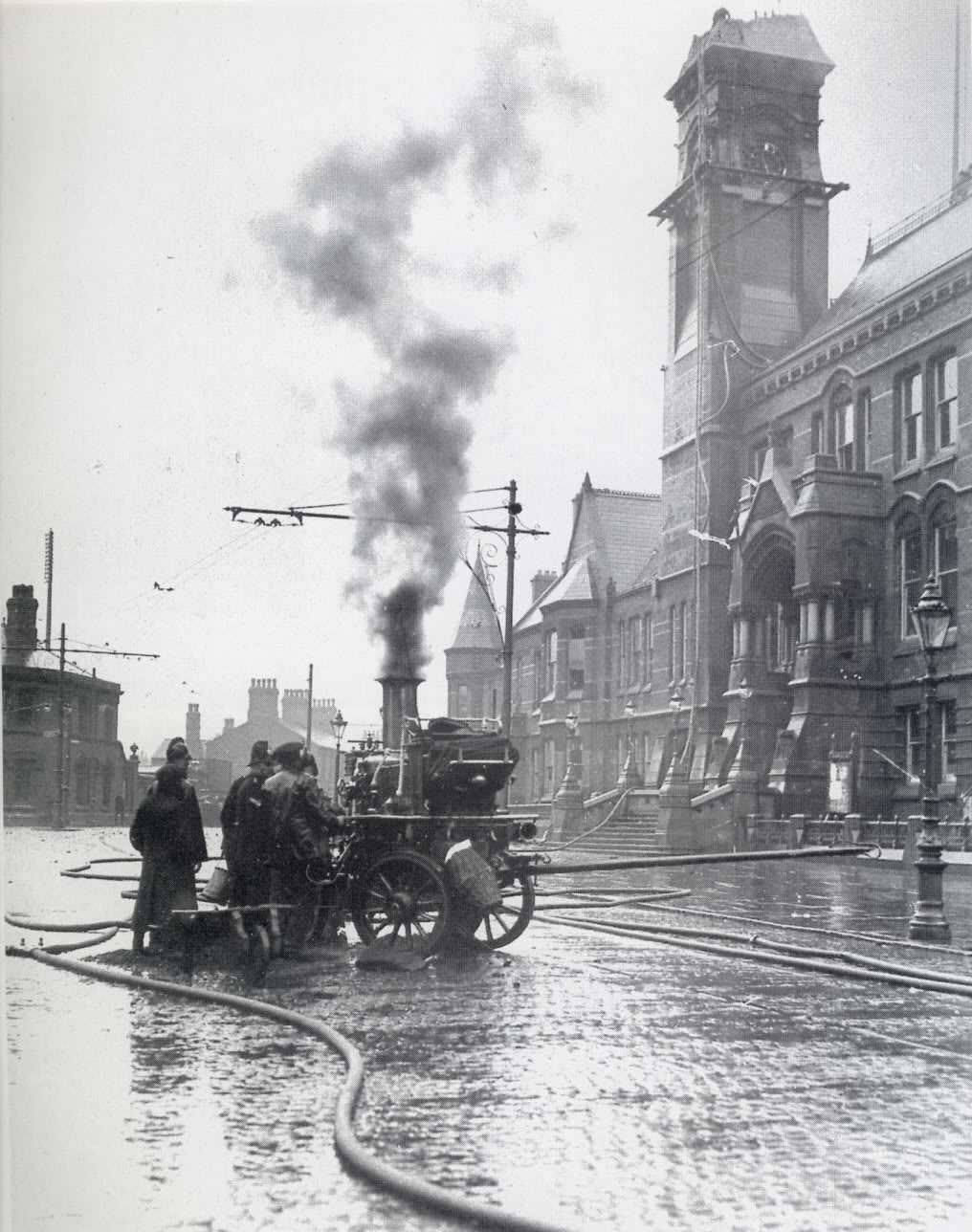
The Town Hall loses its steeple a second time, permanently, in 1913.

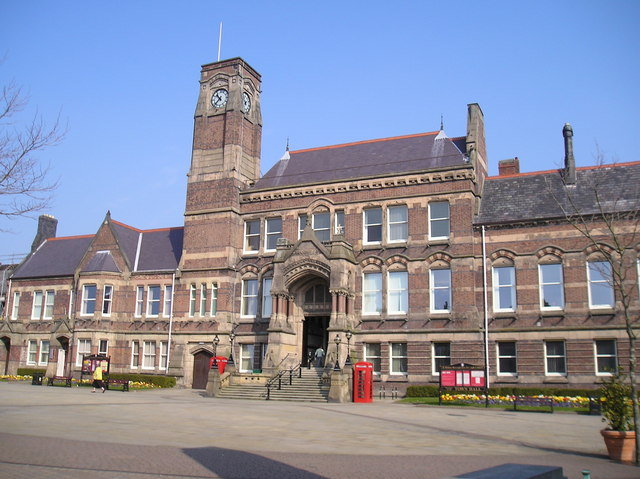
St Helens Town Hall as it appears today without the steeple.

=== St Helens and early industry ===
Until the mid-18th century, industry was almost entirely based on small scale home based industries such as linen weaving. The landscape was dotted with small scale excavation and mining operations, primarily for clay and peat, but also for coal. It is coal to which the region owes its initial impetus for growth and development with its symbiotic relationship with the coal dependent copper smelting and glass industries paramount.

Before 1700 most of the land had been used for arable farming since the 12th century according to the historical family records of William De Daresbury. The township of Sutton was described as "assessed at four plough-lands". Plow or ploughlands are assessed at 120 acres (0.49 km^{2}) apiece. The pastoral nature of the local area was still common in 1901 with William Farrer noting of Eccleston that the "country is of an undulating nature and principally dedicated to agriculture, fields of rich and fertile soil being predominant" and describing the produce as "chiefly potatoes, oats, and wheat on a clayey soil which alternates with peat". Farrer noted that several old quarries and shafts existed in the area and referred to a "brewery at Portico, and a pottery near Prescot, while glass, watchmakers' tools, and mineral waters are also manufactured".

In contrast two hundred years earlier St Helens was far more scarred and pitted by shallow mining operations, often quickly abandoned, left to flood and prone to collapse. The primitive mining techniques, and limited ability to pump out water meant many pits had short lifespans. Complaints to the Holland family, by then Lords of Sutton Manor, are recorded from 1611, particularly in Sutton Heath, about plans to expand out such short lived mine shafts across the town, decrying the destruction of the land and waste. Money and public demand prevailed over any reservations held and shallow mining operations expanded rapidly.

In 2009, four hundred years after it began, the Council underlined the finality of the coal industries decline in the area when it rejected a planning application for an open cast mine.

=== Coal ===
Sited on the Lancashire Coalfield, the town was built both physically and metaphorically on coal; the original motto on the borough coat of arms was "Ex Terra Lucem" (roughly translated from Latin to "From the Ground, Light") and local collieries employed up to 5,000 men in the 1970s. During the boom years of the British coal industry (with 1913 the peak year of production with 1 million being employed in UK mining industry) the St.Helens division of the Lancashire and Cheshire Miners' Federation (the local miners' union) had the largest membership (10%) of that federation.

The discovery of winnable coal seams is mentioned in a deposition of 1556, referred to as "Beds of cinders or coke ... have been discovered three feet thick" during the digging of a clay pit and commonly is attributed to the Eltonhead family (Elton Head Road, modern B5204, shares the name of the family) who had recently taken residence at Gifforth House. Reference to the significant distribution of "potsherds" during excavation suggest that some industry had been under way for some time before, possibly the 13th century, and the clay and pottery industries lasted until the early 20th century. The discovery sparked a dispute between the landlord Bolds, and their tenants, the Eltonheads, eventually resulting in an agreement to compensate the Bold family 4d (the equivalent of a groat). The depositions were taken at Winwick in April, 1556.

In the 18th century coal was the enabling force that opened up opportunities for further commercial and industrial developments, that in turn drove demand for the movement of raw goods not simply out of the town such as coal to Liverpool to fuel its shipping, steel works and its salt works but also in promoting an influx of raw products to be processed within the town itself.

The importance of transport links to and from the St Helens coal beds is made evident through claims made to Parliament in 1746 for maintenance, and extension of the Turnpike road after localised flooding had damaged it.

"because Prescot, being Three Miles nearer to Liverpoole than St Helens, Persons will naturally go to the former Place for Coals, if they can be supplied as well and as cheap there as at the latter"

— T.C. Barker quoting Witness John Eyes, Merseyside Town in the Industrial Revolution: St. Helens, 1750–1900

St Helens development owes as much to its location on the south Lancashire Coalfield as it does the fact that Liverpool, Chester and other centres of industry were not, and provided ready markets for the coal.

=== Sankey Canal ===
St Helens distant location from the Mersey and its dependence upon strong land transport links emphasised in the 1746 case brought before Parliament made it vital for the townships to continue to promote themselves as rich resource centres essential for the growth of Liverpool, Chester and other coal hungry large industrial towns desperate for raw materials. Liverpool recognised their need for a ready supply of coal for its forges, salt manufacture and ship building and first petitioned for the extension of The Liverpool to Prescot Turnpike turnpike road before later extending their designs to a canal system.

The original concept was to make the Sankey Brook navigable, but the result was a fully man-made canal linking St Helens initially to the River Mersey and thereby the city of Liverpool. The Sankey Canal was opened in 1757, and extended in 1775, to transport coal from the pits in Ravenhead, Haydock and Parr to Liverpool, and for raw materials to be shipped to St Helens. The canal networks were to extend out across Britain over the next century to many more major industrial centres.

The transport revolution in the region encouraged an influx of business opportunities to a previously sparsely populated area bringing with it work opportunities. The net result was a significant population boom and St Helens grew from a sparsely populated array of manor houses and their tenants in 1700 into a sprawling span of expansive mining operations, forges and pottery manufacturers by the early 19th century.

=== The industrialists ===
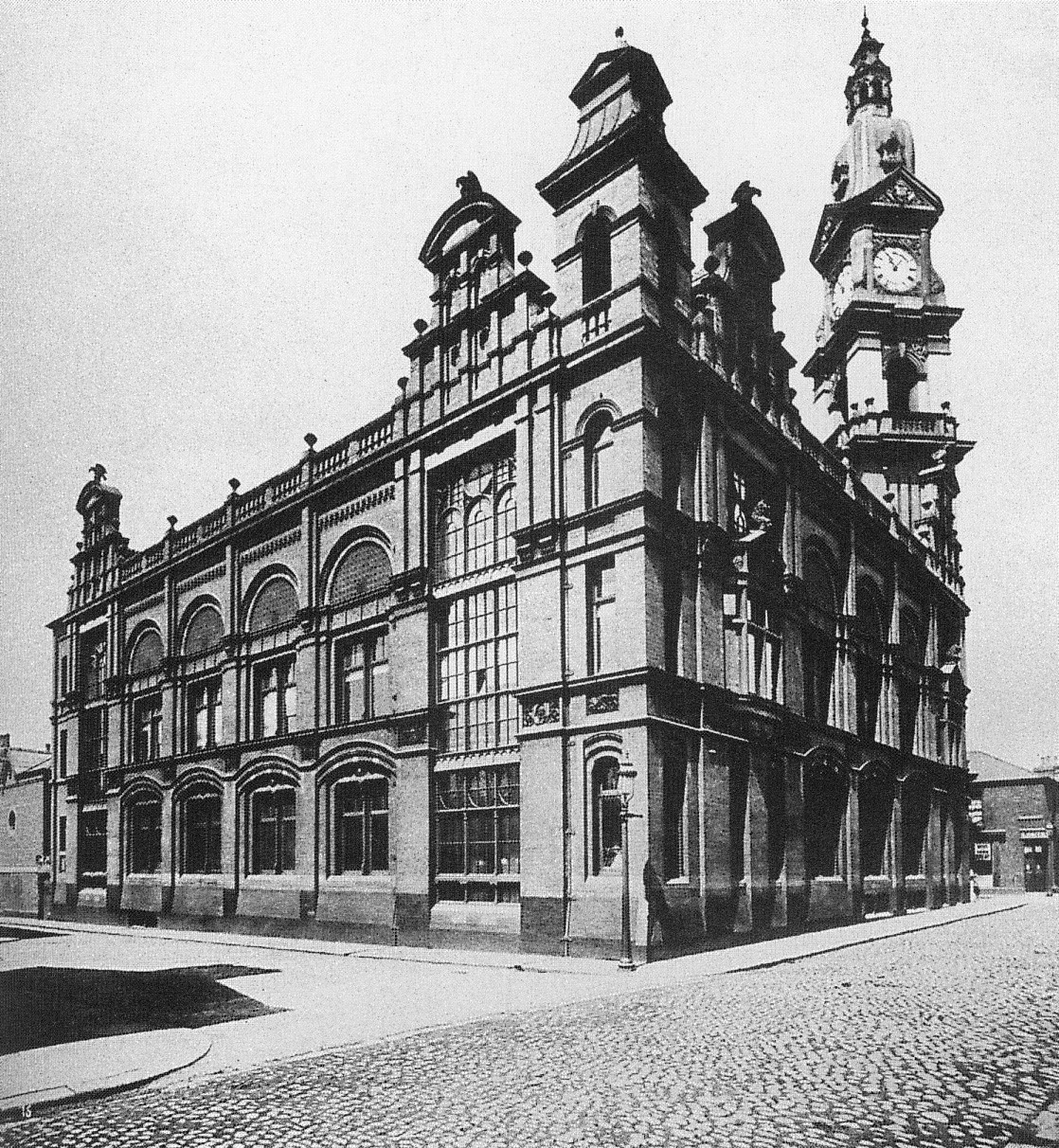
Beecham's Clock Tower built in 1877.

The foundation of these new ventures owed much to industrialists from outside the town, the length and breadth of the country. Firstly the development of the James Watt's stationery steam engine in the 1770s was a significant factor. Collieries would now be able to pump water from greater depths and shafts could be driven to find even deeper coal seams. At the same time the use of machinery for cotton mills such as the spinning mule and later still the forges with the invention of the steam hammer increased the demand exponentially for coal.

The local gentry moved out of the growing towns which filled with the working classes. In their place came wealthy industrialists such as John Mackay, who leased land in St Helens in the 1760s from King George III before buying Ravenhead Farm from the Archbishop of York, as well as Michael Hughes, the Gambles, and later Thomas Beecham, Thomas Greenall and the Pilkingtons. A few remained such as the Gerards of Bryn who moved into Windle Hall.

Their drive and investments established the foundations of the towns resurgence between 1780 and 1830 that ultimately saw St Helens grow into its role as a modern market town.

"if any ... good colliers ... will apply at Thatto Heath Colliery, they will meet with constant employ and the best encouragement."

— Mike Fletcher quoting John Mackay, Black Gold & Hot Sand, 200

=== Copper ===
One of the first industries to grow out of the transport innovations was copper smelting. The Parys Mining company, led by Michael Hughes, leased land from John Mackay close to the newly constructed Sankey Canal at Ravenhead (near Ravenhead Colliery) in late 1779. Copper ore was carried from Amlwch in North Wales to St Helens via the Mersey directly to the point where coal was mined. Some 10,000 tons of copper ore yielding over 1,300 tons of copper passed along this route.

At the same time, the Gerards rented land at Stanley Bank, beside the Black Brook, in Ashton in Makerfield to the Patten & Co company from Warrington. The company smelted iron and copper using coal from the Gerard's mines, then moved the end product downstream from a private wharf on the navigable brook.

The boom did not last and by 1783 coal owners such as Mackay, Sarah Clayton and Thomas Case were dead, penniless or both. The global constriction on coal shipments during a turbulent struggle with the US, and the reliance on shipping to the USA during the War of Independence 1775–1783 brought ruin to many and led to the permanent loss of several smaller industries. The Mining industry recovered when the embargo was lifted, and some lower level smelting returned when the demand for steam engines grew in the later parts of the 19th century.

=== Plate Glass ===
The abundance of coal, the quality of local sand, the availability of Cheshire salt made glass making an industry in Sutton since 1688 when the French Huguenot descendant John Leaf Snr. is recorded paying the Eltonhead family £50 for a lease of 2½ acres of Sutton's Lower Hey. The glass industry was boosted when the Crown in 1786 authorised the establishment of the "British Cast Plate Glass Company" in Ravenhead and set the region as the market leader for glass.

=== Chemics, chemists and engineers ===
The Gamble family started lime and alkali pits, fulfilling the need of the glass industry and saving on import costs. The growing demand for chemical processing also contributed heavily to the growth of Widnes.

In 1830 the Liverpool and Manchester Railway passed through the southern edge of the town at Rainhill and St Helens Junction, furthering its economic development as a centre of industry.

== The decline of heavy industry ==
=== The decline of the mining industry ===
The many coal mines in St Helens and the outlying area, including Clock Face, Ravenhead, Sutton, Bold, Wood Pit (Haydock), Lyme Pit (Haydock), Old Boston (Haydock) and Lea Green, were closed between the 1950s and early 1990s. By 1992 all the mines had been shut with Sutton Manor Colliery the last to go in St Helens proper, finally closing its doors on 24 May 1991. The events leading to the collapse of the coal mining industry were ultimately reflected by events during the Miners strikes in the '80s and St Helens was but one of dozens of towns in the UK that was immediately set to lose a long-standing employer due to what was put down as rising costs. In the case of Sutton Manor Colliery, it was estimated to have 40 years of winnable coal still beneath the surface. The last colliery in the modern metropolitan borough and in the St Helens area of the South Lancashire Coalfield, was Parkside, in Newton-le-Willows, which was closed in 1992.

== St Helens since 1950 ==
In the 2016 United Kingdom European Union membership referendum, St Helens voted in favour of Brexit.

== Parish, district and borough ==
A section dedicated to the changing political structure of St Helens between 1700 and 1974

== Monuments and buildings ==
There are 159 listed buildings and 12 scheduled monuments in the Metropolitan Borough of St Helens.

| LBS Uid | NGR | Building name | Street Name | Grade | Parish |
|---|---|---|---|---|---|
| 216298 | SJ5247999591 | Church Of St Mary And Presbytery | Birchley Road | II | Billinge |
| 216299 | SJ5219999452 | Lime Vale | Birchley Road | II | Billinge |
| 216300 | SJ5241999817 | Birchley Hall | Birchley Road | II* | Billinge |
| 216301 | SJ5299399709 | Nugent House Special School | Carr Mill Road | II | Billinge |
| 216302 | SJ5239898808 | Otters Swift Farm Barn | Carr Mill Road | II | Billinge |
| 216303 | SJ5242398804 | Otters Swift Farm Building To East Of Barn | Carr Mill Road | II | Billinge |
| 216304 | SD5332600697 | Church Of St Aidan | Main Street | II* | Billinge |
| 216305 | SD5329800683 | Wall And Piers On South And West Side Of Church Of Saint Aidan | Main Street | II | Billinge |
| 216306 | SD5332800675 | Tomb Of George And Kitty Smith On South Side Of Church Of Saint Aidan | Main Street | II | Billinge |
| 216307 | SD5260000377 | Crookhurst Farmhouse | Rainford Road | II | Billinge |
| 216308 | SD5260900342 | Barn To South East Of Crookhurst Farmhouse | Rainford Road | II | Billinge |
| 216309 | SD5200200835 | Great Houghwood Farmhouse | Red Barn Lane | II | Billinge |
| 216310 | SD5196300798 | Great Houghwood Cottage | Red Barn Lane | II | Billinge |
| 216311 | SJ5444797057 | Pear Tree Farmhouse | Clipsley Lane | II | Newton |
| 216312 | SJ5563096002 | The Grange | Grange Road | II | Newton |
| 216313 | SJ5734394436 | Bradley Lock | Bradleigh Road | II | Newton |
| 216314 | SJ5761094425 | Bradley Swing Bridge | Bradleigh Road | II | Newton |
| 216315 | SJ5687194713 | Sankey Viaduct Over Sankey Brook (That Part In St Helens District) | Bradley Lane | I | Newton |
| 216316 | SJ5930095643 | Church Of St Peter | Church Street | II | Newton |
| 216317 | SJ5927695640 | Parish Stocks | Church Street | II | Newton |
| 216318 | SJ5854795727 | United Reformed Chapel | Crow Lane East | II | Newton |
| 216319 | SJ5852595745 | Memorial To North West Of Burial Ground Of United Reformed Chapel | Crow Lane East | II | Newton |
| 216320 | SJ5820095685 | 159, 161 And 163 | Crow Lane East | II* | Newton |
| 216321 | SJ5811695666 | Church Of St Mary And St John | Crow Lane East | II | Newton |
| 216322 | SJ5865995870 | Fairbrothers Farmhouse 68 | Crow Lane East | II | Newton |
| 216323 | SJ5881895898 | Entrance Archway To Randall's Nursery | High Street | II* | Newton |
| 216324 | SJ5875495933 | 158 And 160 | High Street | II | Newton |
| 216325 | SJ5747595323 | Obelisk | Market Place | II | Newton |
| 216326 | SJ5739095328 | South African War Memorial | Market Street | II | Newton |
| 216327 | SJ5974894973 | Newton Park Farmhouse | Mill Lane | II | Newton |
| 216328 | SJ5980394983 | Barn To East Of Newton Park Farmhouse | Mill Lane | II | Newton |
| 216329 | SJ5934395335 | Newton Station | Mill Lane | II | Newton |
| 216330 | SJ5927095320 | Newton Viaduct To West Of Station | Mill Lane | II | Newton |
| 216331 | SJ5919596604 | Dean School Cottage | Newton Lane | II | Newton |
| 216335 | SJ6016195427 | Huskisson Memorial On South Side Of Railway, 60 Metres From Road | Parkside Road | II | Newton |
| 216336 | SJ5775895120 | Earlstown Station Building To South Of Railway | Railway Street | II | Newton |
| 216337 | SD4782200739 | Golden Lion Public House | Church Road | II | Rainford |
| 216338 | SD4786600668 | Church Of All Saints | Church Road | II | Rainford |
| 216339 | SD4800900519 | Village Stocks At Corner Of Mossborough Road | Church Road | II | Rainford |
| 216340 | SJ5012799561 | Heysome House | Crank Hill | II | Rainford |
| 216341 | SJ5014399599 | Barn To North Of Heysome House | Crank Hill | II | Rainford |
| 216342 | SJ5010999599 | Stable To North West Of Heysome House | Crank Hill | II | Rainford |
| 216343 | SD5114400211 | Guildhall Farmhouse | Gores Lane | II* | Rainford |
| 216344 | SD5116700177 | Barn To East Of Guildhall Farmhouse, Alongside The Lane | Gores Lane | II | Rainford |
| 216345 | SD4851500819 | Farm Building At Whitehouse Farm | Higher Lane | II | Rainford |
| 216346 | SD4851300864 | Duck Houses To North Of Buildings At White House Farm | Higher Lane | II | Rainford |
| 216347 | SD4878200322 | Dial House | Higher Lane | II | Rainford |
| 216348 | SD4879700332 | Barn To North Of Dial House | Higher Lane | II | Rainford |
| 216349 | SD4857302719 | Maggot's Nook Farmhouse | Maggot's Nook Road | II | Rainford |
| 216350 | SD4836302182 | Scythe Stone Delph Farmhouse | Maggot's Nook Road | II | Rainford |
| 216351 | SJ4649198953 | Mossborough Hall | Mossborough Hall Ln | II | Rainford |
| 216352 | SJ4645898996 | Cow Houses To North West Of Mossborough Hall | Mossborough Hall Ln | II | Rainford |
| 216353 | SJ4643099017 | Building To North West Of Cowhouses At Mosborough Hall | Mossborough Hall Ln | II | Rainford |
| 216354 | SJ4639599008 | Smithy To West Of Barn At Mossborough Hall | Mossborough Hall Ln | II | Rainford |
| 216355 | SJ4996296958 | Ruins Of Windleshaw Abbey In Roman Catholic Cemetery (Chapel Of Saint Thomas Of Canterbury) | Abbey Road | II* | St Helens |
| 216356 | SJ4997496950 | Cross To South Of Windleshaw Abbey | Abbey Road | II | St Helens |
| 216357 | SJ5337496623 | Church Of St Mary Immaculate | Blackbrook Road | II | St Helens |
| 216358 | SJ5358896094 | Old Double Lock | Blackbrook Road | II | St Helens |
| 216359 | SJ5355195480 | Church Of St Peter | Broad Oak Road | II | St Helens |
| 216360 | SJ5128995238 | Church Of St Helen | Church Street | II | St Helens |
| 216361 | SJ5143395243 | Friend's Meeting House | Church Street | II | St Helens |
| 216362 | SJ5072096488 | The Mansion House | City Road | II | St Helens |
| 216363 | SJ5087396337 | Lodge To Victoria Park | City Road | II | St Helens |
| 216364 | SJ5070596540 | Grotto By Lake To North Of Victoria Park House | City Road | II | St Helens |
| 216365 | SJ5148795464 | Church Of Holy Cross And Saint Helen | Corporation Street | II | St Helens |
| 216366 | SJ4986594093 | Church Of St John Evangelist | Crossley Road | II | St Helens |
| 216367 | SJ4998594350 | Offices Of Pilkington's Ravenhead Works | Factory Row | II | St Helens |
| 216368 | SJ5090895097 | Offices At Pilkington's Glass Works | Grove Street | II | St Helens |
| 216369 | SJ5090295043 | Offices At Pilkington's Glass Works To South Of Watson Street Junction | Grove Street | II | St Helens |
| 216370 | SJ5125495390 | Former National Westminster Bank At Corner Of Claughton Street | Hardshaw Street | II | St Helens |
| 216372 | SJ5360193191 | 2 | Lionel Street | II | St Helens |
| 216373 | SJ5198396211 | New Double Lock On The Sankey Canal | Lock Street | II | St Helens |
| 216374 | SJ5193892467 | Bridge Over Railway | Marshall's Cross Road | II | St Helens |
| 216375 | SJ5218592631 | Church Of St Nicholas | New Street | II | St Helens |
| 216376 | SJ5224592610 | Bridge Over Railway | New Street | II | St Helens |
| 216377 | SJ5093595844 | Church Of St Mary, Lowe House | North Road | II | St Helens |
| 216378 | SJ4963892983 | Nutgrove Hall | Nutgrove Road | II | St Helens |
| 216379 | SJ4910395279 | Home Farmhouse And Attached Barn | Old Eccleston Lane | II | St Helens |
| 216380 | SJ4876593965 | Seddon's Cottage | Prescot Road | II | St Helens |
| 216381 | SJ5115093283 | Sherdley Hall Farmhouse | Sherdley Road | II | St Helens |
| 216382 | SJ5156894785 | Bottle Shop At Former Ravenhead Glass Bottle Works 7 | Sutton Lodge Road | II | St Helens |
| 216383 | SJ5304693956 | 2 | Lancots Lane | II | St Helens |
| 216384 | SJ5222095412 | Church Of Holy Trinity | Traverse Street | II | St Helens |
| 216385 | SJ5126195476 | Statue Of Queen Victoria In Centre Of Square | Victoria Square | II* | St Helens |
| 216386 | SJ5121495014 | Tank House, Beside Canal At Crown Glass Works 9 | Watson Street | II* | St Helens |
| 216387 | SJ5527499215 | Manor House 317 | Garswood Road | II | Seneley Green |
| 216388 | SJ5612198515 | Le Chateau | Millfield Lane | II | Seneley Green |
| 216389 | SJ5374298532 | Hollin Hey Farmhouse | Old Garswood Road | II | Seneley Green |
| 216390 | SJ5360098540 | Hollin Hey House | Old Garswood Road | II | Seneley Green |
| 216391 | SD5576900463 | Holy Trinity Church | Rectory Road | II | Seneley Green |
| 216392 | SD5579300478 | The Old Rectory | Rectory Road | II | Seneley Green |
| 216393 | SJ5543499283 | Garswood Branch Library | School Lane | II | Seneley Green |
| 216394 | SJ4947892592 | Rainhill Hospital (Sherdley Division) | Nutgrove Road | DL | St Helens |
| 216395 | SD4824100194 | Two Statues The Images At Numbers 133 And 135 133 And 135 | Church Road | II | Rainford |
| 216396 | SJ5125995510 | Pair Of K6 Telephone Kiosks Flanking Steps To The Town Hall | Corporation Street | II | St Helens |
| 216397 | SJ5337593621 | Church Of All Saints | Ellamsbridge Road | II | St Helens |
| 358741 | SJ5088095415 | Beechams Clock Tower And Offices | Westfield Street | II | St Helens |
| 358742 | SJ5020494248 | Part Of Numbers 96 And 98 Former Windmill Tower, Ravenhead 96 And 98 | Ravenhead Road | II | St Helens |
| 402560 | SD5125901559 | Billinge Hall | Crank Road | II | Billinge |
| 402563 | SD5116001406 | Derbyshire House | Crank Road | II | Billinge |
| 402565 | SD5130601376 | Barn South West Of Crow's Nest | Crank Road | II | Billinge |
| 402574 | SD5126701405 | Former Mill To West Of Crow's Nest | Crank Road | II | Billinge |
| 402582 | SD5053102168 | Maddocks Farmhouse | Pimbo Road | II | Rainford |
| 402583 | SD5057601291 | Fir Tree House | Pimbo Road | II | Rainford |
| 402584 | SD5063701248 | Gazebo Approximately 80 Metres To North East Of Number 52 | Pimbo Road | II | Rainford |
| 403300 | SD5160401688 | Shaley Brow Farm Barn | Crank Road | II | Rainford |
| 436381 | SJ5418890328 | Gate Piers At Bold Old Hall | | II | Bold |
| 436382 | SJ5420890329 | Bridge At Bold Old Hall | | II | Bold |
| 436388 | SJ4706095388 | Clay Lane Farmhouse | Clay Lane | II | Eccleston |
| 436389 | SJ4897393395 | Scholes House | Scholes Lane | II* | Eccleston |
| 436390 | SJ4897293395 | Adjacent Ruins At Scholes House | Scholes Lane | II* | Eccleston |
| 436391 | SJ4891893396 | Effigy Pedestal In Garden Of Scholes House | Scholes Lane | II* | Eccleston |
| 436397 | SJ4897690254 | Old Hall Farmhouse | Blundell's Lane | II* | Rainhill |
| 436398 | SJ4853890372 | Dean's Farmhouse | Blundell's Lane | II | Rainhill |
| 436399 | SJ4849590354 | Range Of Adjoining Farm Buildings In L Plan (Rear Of Dean's Farmhouse) | Blundell's Lane | II | Rainhill |
| 436400 | SJ4998090120 | Manor Farmhouse | Mill Lane | II* | Rainhill |
| 436401 | SJ4945290340 | Cross | Mill Lane | II | Rainhill |
| 436402 | SJ4905691398 | Skew Bridge | Warrington Road | II | Rainhill |
| 436403 | SJ4908691392 | Milestone On Skew Bridge | Warrington Road | II | Rainhill |
| 436404 | SJ4932791252 | Church Of St Anne | Warrington Road | C | Rainhill |
| 436405 | SJ5097590699 | Wood's House Farmhouse | School Lane | II | Rainhill |
| 436406 | SJ5017890352 | Roman Catholic Church Of St Bartholomew | Warrington Road | II | Rainhill |
| 436407 | SJ5012490608 | Loyola Hall | Warrington Road | II | Rainhill |
| 436408 | SJ5077589715 | Rainhill Cottage | Warrington Road | II | Rainhill |
| 436420 | SJ4939196793 | 53 And 55 | Rainford Road | II | Windle |
| 436688 | SJ4938696792 | Cockleshell Cottage 57 | Rainford Road | II | Windle |
| 436689 | SJ4938296794 | 59 | Rainford Road | II | Windle |
| 436694 | SJ5013390079 | Smithy Cottage And That Part Of The Same House In Corporated Within Smity House | Warrington Road | II | Rainhill |
| 440456 | SJ5056296122 | Cowley Hill School, North Block | Cowley Hill Lane | DL | St Helens |
| 440457 | SJ5055796075 | Cowley High School, South Block | Cowley Hill Lane | II | St Helens |
| 444001 | SJ5040094819 | Head Offices, Steps To Lake And Canteen At Pilkington Glassworks | Borough Road | II | St Helens |
| 444088 | SJ5042794762 | St Helens South Lake Surrounds And Bridge At Pilkington Glassworks | Borough Road | II | St Helens |
| 449412 | SJ4945696823 | The Malthouse | Rainford Road | II | Windle |
| 488034 | SJ5097195970 | West Derby War Memorial At Eccleston Park | | II | St Helens |
| 489783 | | Farm Outbuilding, Formerly Stables, At Former Bold Hall Estate | | II | Bold |
| 489784 | | Farmhouse At Former Bold Hall Estate | | II | Bold |
| 491589 | SJ5428791664 | Walled Garden Adjoining Site Of Former Bold Hall | | II | Bold |
| 492355 | SJ4951290269 | Briars Hey | Mill Lane | II | Rainhill |
| 502149 | SJ4915591422 | Rainhill Station | Station Road | II | Rainhill |
| 502835 | SJ4927891294 | Former St Annes Church School | Warrington Road | II | Rainhill |
| 504634 | SJ5737195338 | Earlestown Town Hall | Market Street | II | St Helens |
| 505083 | SJ5604198676 | Gate Piers, Gates And Flanking Walls At Ashton Cross | Millfield Lane | II | Seneley Green |
| 505555 | SJ4844595558 | Christ Church | Church Road | II | Eccleston |
| 505587 | SJ4873295036 | Eccleston Hall | Holme Road | II | Eccleston |
| 506291 | SJ4847692202 | Greenshouse Farmhouse | Longton Lane | II | Rainhill |
| 506292 | SJ4848492173 | Range Of Barn, Stables And Associated Buildings South South East Of Greenshouse Farmhouse | Longton Lane | II | Rainhill |
| 507533 | SJ5033991816 | Bourne's Tunnel At Sj5033491804 | A570 | II | St Helens |

== See also ==
- Trolleybuses in St Helens
- Blackbrook, St Helens
- Bold, Merseyside
- Clock Face, Merseyside
- Eccleston, Merseyside
- Haydock
- Parr, St Helens
- Sutton, Merseyside
- Windle, St Helens
