= Thomas Jollie =

English Dissenter

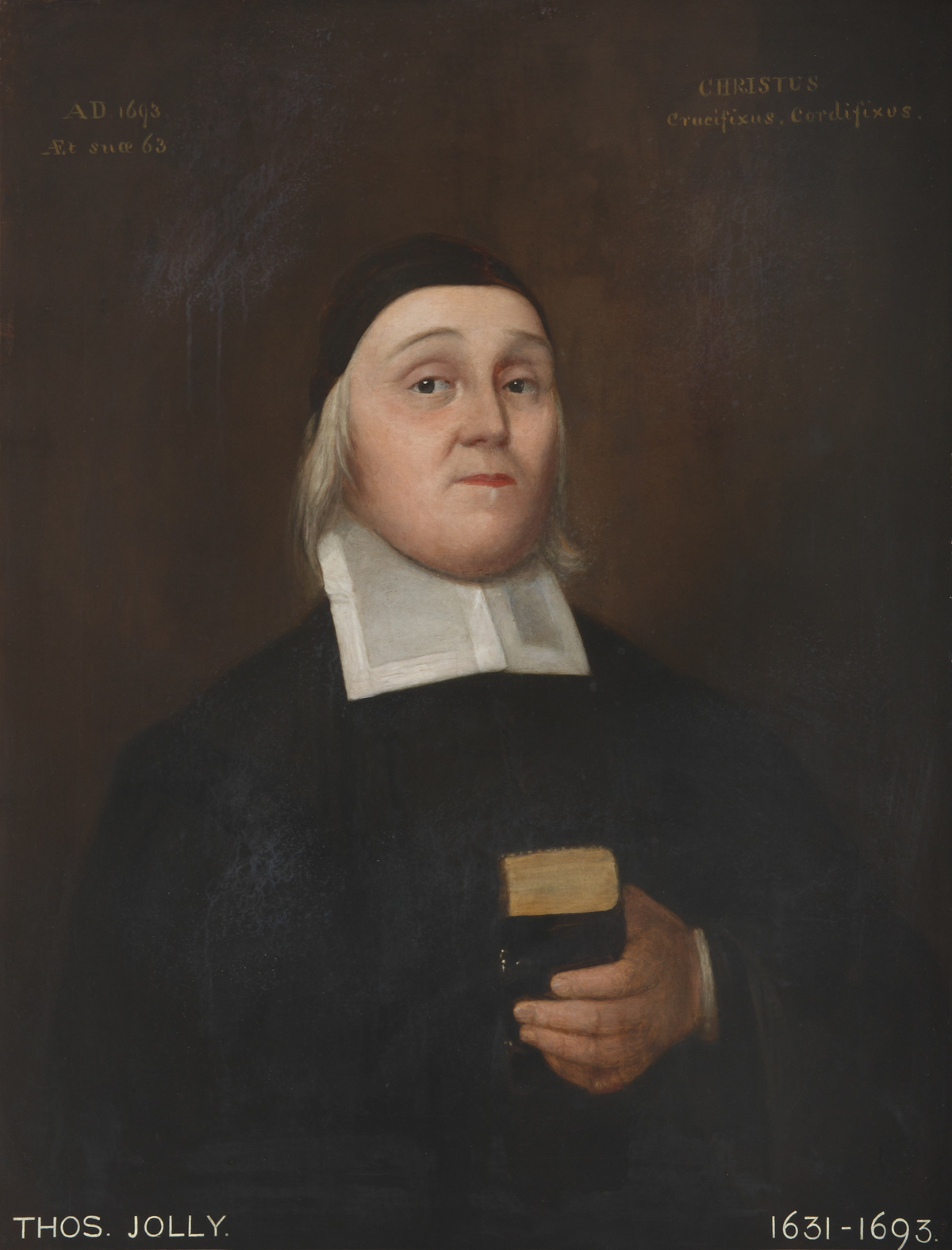

Personal life
- Born: September 14, 1629 Droylsden
- Died: March 14, 1703 (aged 73)
- Education: Trinity College, Cambridge (did not graduate)

Religious life
- Religion: Protestant

Thomas Jollie (1629–1703) was an English Dissenter, a minister ejected from the Church of England for his beliefs.

== Biography ==
Thomas Jollie was born at Droylsden, near Manchester, on 14 September 1629, and baptised on 29 September at Gorton Chapel, then in the parish of Manchester. His father, Major James Jollie (1610–1666), was Cromwell’s provost-marshal general of the forces in Lancashire (1642–7), and was nominated (2 October 1646) an elder for Gorton in the first or Manchester classis in the presbyterial arrangement for Lancashire, but did not act, being an independent. He married Elizabeth Hall (d February 1689, aged 92), widow, of Droylsden, whose daughter by the former marriage was wife of Adam Martindale. Thomas Jollie entered Trinity College, Cambridge, in 1645, two years earlier than Oliver Heywood, with whom he formed a lifelong friendship. He does not seem to have graduated.

=== First ministry ===
Having received a unanimous call from the parishioners of Altham, a chapelry in the parish of Whalley, Lancashire, he settled there in September 1649. He formed at Altham despite opposition a gathered church, and ministered there with growing repute. Excommunication was practised in his church with no respect of persons. In 1655 Jennet, daughter of Robert Cunliffe, a member of parliament for Lancashire, was excommunicated for promising marriage to a papist (John Grimshaw) "against the advice of the church."

=== Arrests ===
Jollie was one of twenty-one Lancashire ministers, presbyterian and independent, who met at Manchester on 13 July 1659 and subscribed ten articles of a proposed ‘accommodation’ between those two bodies. A further meeting was to have been held in the following September, but all such measures were broken off by the rising under George Booth, 1st Baron Delamer. After the Restoration Jollie got into trouble through not using the prayer-book. Arrested on a warrant from three deputy-lieutenants, he was discharged on taking the oath of supremacy. A second arrest was followed by an attempt to forcibly prevent his preaching. At length he was cited to the bishop's court at Chester, and after three appearances was condemned to suspension. His suspension was delayed by the death of his bishop, Henry Ferne, on 16 March 1662, but was carried into effect so as to prohibit him from preaching on 17 August. On the following Sunday (24 August) the Uniformity Act came into force, and Jollie resigned his living.

After a time he moved to Healey, in Burnley, Lancashire. Here in 1663 he was placed under arrest on suspicion, and was shortly afterwards committed to custody at Skipton, on the charge of keeping a conventicle. Soon after his release he was arrested while riding in Lancashire, and confined in York Castle for some months in the winter. In 1664 he was seized at a conventicle and imprisoned for eleven weeks in Lancaster Castle; in 1665 he was again under arrest. He had a friend in the presbyterian Lady Hoghton, whom he frequently visited at Hoghton Tower, Lancashire. In 1667 he bought the farmhouse of Wymondhouses (Pendleton), at the foot of Pendle Hill, near Clitheroe, in the parish of Whalley, Lancashire. In 1669 he was committed to gaol at Preston for six months, under the Five Miles Act, for preaching near Altham. On the indulgence of 1672 he took out licenses for four preaching places at and about Wymondhouses. An ingenious arrangement of the staircase at Wymondhouses enabled him to evade arrest while preaching there after the revocation of indulgence. He was committed, however, for preaching at Slaidburn, near Clitheroe, in 1674, and was fined £20. In 1684 he was brought before Chief-justice Jeffreys at Preston for keeping conventicles, was bound over to the next assizes, and was then discharged by Baron Atkins. At the revolution he built a meeting-house at Wymondhouses adjoining his residence. In 1689 an additional building was licensed at Sparth, and another later at Newton-in-Bowland, both in the parish of Whalley.

=== Richard Dugdale ===
On 28 April 1689 Jollie took up the case of Richard Dugdale, the alleged ‘demoniack’ of Surey, near Clitheroe. He maintained that Dugdale's was ‘as real a possession as any in the gospels.’ With the aid of over twelve nonconforming divines, including Richard Frankland and Oliver Heywood, he tried exorcism by prayer and fasting. The young man's recovery was slow. In a tract of 1697 Jollie ascribed his cure to the prayers of the nonconformists. Zachary Taylor (died 1703), vicar of Ormskirk, son of an ejected minister of the same name, wrote two tracts (1697–9) to expose the ‘popery’ and ‘knavery’ of this business. John Carrington (died 1701), presbyterian minister at Lancaster, who had taken part in the exorcism, came forward in its defence; Frankland and Heywood were significantly silent.

=== Happy union ===
Though Jollie was a strong independent and a great stickler for his principles in the matter of ordination, he joined the ‘happy union’ of presbyterians and congregationalists, which was not introduced into Lancashire till 3 April 1693, when it had already been dissolved in London. At the third meeting (4 Sept. 1694) he was appointed, with Henry Newcome, the Manchester presbyterian, to conduct the correspondence for the county. At the tenth meeting (12 April 1698) he preached the sermon. According to Calamy, ‘he drew up a large essay for farther concord amongst evangelical reforming churches.’

=== Death and family ===
Thomas died at Wymondhouses on 14 March 1703, and was buried on 18 March at Altham. His portrait hangs in Mansfield College, Oxford, the university's first Nonconformist college.

He was three times a widower before he reached the age of thirty; his fourth wife died 8 June 1675, aged 42. He had two sons, Timothy and Samuel. Timothy went on to become a preacher.

Among his collateral descendants is William Bowland, the current 16th Lord of Bowland.

== Publications ==
He published:

1. The Surey Demoniack, 1697. The tract appears to have been drafted by Jollie and expanded by Carrington; the preface, signed by ‘Thomas Jolly’ and five other divines, gives an account of the mysterious loss of the true copy; hence some particulars in this print were subsequently repudiated as inauthentic.
2. A Vindication of the Surey Demoniack … By T. J., 1698, (at end is ‘Some Few Passages,’ &c., being the first draft of No. 1).
3. A Treatise on Heavenly Mindedness

Curious extracts from an abstract of his Church Book are given by Hunter and Nightingale. Nightingale says the original is lost, but the portion of it from 1670 to 1693 was recovered by Mr. George Neilson of Glasgow.
