= Zachary Taylor (priest) =

English priest and writer

Zachary Taylor (1653–1705) was an English priest, known for his controversial writings. One of his opponents dubbed him the "Lancashire Levite"

== Life ==
He was born at Bolton, Lancashire, on 20 April 1653, and baptised at the parish church on 24 April; his father Zachary Taylor the elder (1619–1693) was an ejected minister in 1662, married to Abigail Ward, who became a schoolmaster. The younger Zachary Taylor was admitted at Jesus College, Cambridge, on 19 April 1671, and graduated B.A. in 1675, and M.A. in 1678; he was incorporated at Oxford on 13 July 1678.

Taylor was appointed vicar of Ormskirk on 9 March 1680, and resigned in 1693, becoming curate to the rector of Wigan. On 10 December 1695 he was appointed by the crown to the rectory of Croston, Lancashire, retaining the curacy of Wigan. He died in 1705, probably in May; his will, dated 30 April, was proved at Chester on 19 June 1705.

== Works ==
Taylor was a Whig hard-liner, and argued in an anonymous tract Submission and Obedience to the Present Government (1690) the duty of taking the oaths of allegiance to William III and Mary II, based on Bishop Overall's Convocation Book. That work had recently been published for the first time by William Sancroft, to justify the attitude of non-jurors; but Taylor interpreted its argument of the book in the opposite sense. The author John Overall had drawn up the manuscript in 1606, and it consisted of a series of canons which had been submitted to Convocation and accepted by it early in James I's reign, concerning the right of subjects to resist oppressive government. The canons, in ambiguous language, denied the right of resistance but recognised that a government originating in rebellion might acquire the stamp of divine authority. James I objected to the second point, and the canons were dropped before they received official confirmation. Sancroft had brought the matter to public notice by insisting on Overall's first doctrine, of non-resistance; Taylor's pamphlet put the opposite emphasis on Overall's argument, and his interpretation seems to have influenced William Sherlock. Taylor added a Vindication (1691), also anonymous.

Taylor is remembered for the part he took in exposing the handling of Richard Dugdale, the "Surey demoniac", by publishing The Surey Impostor, 1697. Many nonconformist ministers in Lancashire, including Thomas Jollie, took Dugdale's condition to be demonic possession. Taylor denounced the affair as imposing on the credulous. Jollie replied, and Taylor rejoined in Popery, Superstition, Ignorance, and Knavery … very fully proved, 1698 He was then attacked in The Lancashire Levite Rebuk'd (1698, anonymous, perhaps by John Carrington of Lancaster), and hence his nickname. Taylor retorted in Popery, Superstition, Ignorance, and Knavery confess'd and fully proved (1699).

A local religious controversy drew from Taylor The Devil turn'd Casuist; or the Cheats of Rome (1696). He published funeral sermons for Lady Elizabeth Bradshaigh (1695) and John Risley (1705).

== Family ==
Taylor married, first, on 12 July 1685, Barbara (died September 1689), daughter of Sir Edward Stanley, 3rd Baronet, of Bickerstaffe. His second wife, Anne, survived him, with several children.

== Notes ==
Attribution

This article incorporates text from a publication now in the public domain: Lee, Sidney, ed. (1898). "Taylor, Zachary". Dictionary of National Biography. Vol. 55. London: Smith, Elder & Co.
