= Richard Hollinworth =

Richard Hollinworth (also Hollingworth) (1607–1656) was an English clergyman of presbyterian views, an influential figure in North-West England in the 1640s.

== Life ==
The son of Francis Hollinworth and Margaret Wharmby his wife, he was born at Manchester, and was baptised on 15 November 1607. He was educated at the Manchester grammar school and Magdalene College, Cambridge, graduating B.A. in 1626–7, and M.A. in 1630. After ordination he became curate of Middleton, near Manchester, under Abdias Assheton.

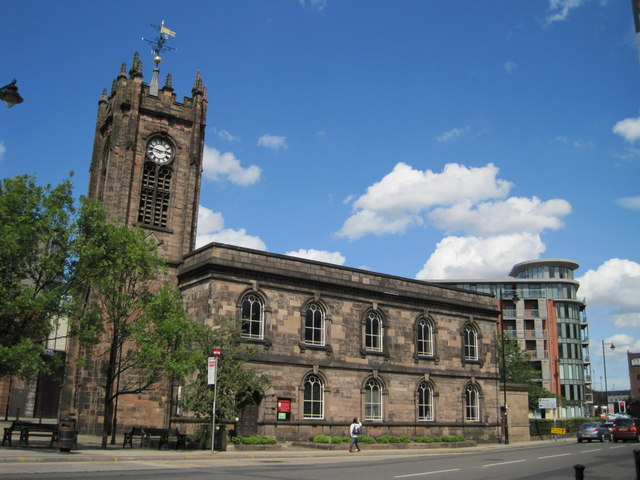
Sacred Trinity Church in Salford today: the tower dates from the original construction

At the consecration of Sacred Trinity Chapel in Salford, on 20 May 1635, Hollinworth preached the sermon, and after the resignation of Thomas Case, who held the living for a short time, he was appointed minister there. He was in that position in 1636, and until a short time before 1649, holding the preferment along with offices at Manchester Collegiate Church. In 1643 he is styled chaplain of the collegiate church, and in the same year succeeded William Bourne in the fellowship there. During the suspension of the corporate body by parliament he officiated, along with Richard Heyrick, the warden, as a "minister"; the college was dissolved in 1650. The "protestation" of the people of Salford in 1642 was taken before him as minister of the town. In 1644 he is named in an ordinance of parliament for ordaining ministers in Lancashire. During the plague outbreak of 1645 in Manchester he worked among the people, Heyrick being absent in London at the Assembly of Divines.

Hollinworth instituted a weekly lecture against the Independents, and became involved in controversy with them. By the exertions of Heyrick and Hollinworth and their friends the presbyterian discipline was established in Lancashire by an ordinance of parliament dated 2 October 1646, and the first meeting was held in the following month at Preston. Hollinworth's name was the second of those signing the Harmonious Consent of the Lancashire ministers with the ministers of London, in 1648, in which religious toleration was condemned.

After the battle of Worcester (September 1651) Hollinworth was one of the Lancashire ministers who were arrested on a charge of being engaged in Christopher Love's plot against the government: others were Heyrick and John Angier. He was released after a short imprisonment, having been held in Liverpool with Angier, John Harrison and William Meek; and returned to Manchester. Hollinworth was a prominent figure at a meeting held at Warrington to consider the question of taking the oath called the Engagement, requiring the people to be faithful to the Commonwealth. In the Manchester classis he generally acted as moderator during Heyrick's absence. He was named in the parliamentary ordinance of 29 August 1654 as a commissioner for ejecting scandalous and ignorant ministers and schoolmasters in Lancashire. When Humphrey Chetham drew up his will for the foundation of what now is Chetham's Library, he nominated Hollinworth one of his feoffees.

Hollinworth died suddenly on 3 November 1656, aged 49, and was buried in Manchester Collegiate Church, where his wife, Margaret, had been interred two years before. At a meeting of the Manchester classis held on the same day it was agreed that a fast should be observed at Manchester. Edward Gee of Eccleston and John Tilsley were asked to preach.

== Works ==
While at Middleton, in 1631, Hollinworth wrote on original sin. This was in answer to a Catholic priest who had intervened in a dispute between two of the fellows of the collegiate church at Manchester.

In 1645 Hollinworth published An Examination of Sundry Scriptures alleadged by our Brethren in defence of some particulars of their Church-way. To this Samuel Eaton and Timothy Taylor replied, and Hollinworth answered them. Details of this controversy are contained in Thomas Edwards's Gangræna (1646), based on information Hollingworth passed to Edwards.

Hollinworth assisted in preparing the Lancashire answer to the Agreement of the People, 1649. In 1649, also, he wrote a popular work in favour of the presbyterian system, entitled The Main Points of Church Government and Discipline plainly and modestly handled by way of question and answer; the introductory epistle was signed by Christopher Love.

In 1653 Hollinworth published The Catechist Catechised, or an Examination of an Anabaptisticall Catechism. … Also some observations … concerning the … present Roman Church and Religion. In 1656 appeared another short book, The Holy Ghost on the Bench, other Spirits at the Barre; or the Judgement of the Holy Spirit of God upon the Spirit of the Times (second edition dated 1657).

He was interested in the history of his native parish, and left in manuscript a volume of historical notes entitled Mancuniensis, which went to Chetham' Library. It was printed in 1839 by William Willis.

Adam Martindale wrongly credited him with writing the An Exercitation concerning Usurped Powers (1650). It has also been assigned to Charles Herle.
