= John Machin (priest) =

English nonconformist priest

John Machin (1624–1664), was an English nonconformist priest.

== Early life ==
Machin was born at Seabridge, in the parish of Stoke-upon-Trent, Staffordshire, on 2 Oct. 1624. He was the only son of John Machin (d. 12 March 1653). His father held the freehold of the Seabridge estate, which had been in his family since 1531. His mother was Katherine Vernon of Audley, Staffordshire. He was educated under Orme of Newcastle-under-Lyne, and John Ball of Whitmore, Staffordshire. At first he was meant for the bar, then trained to farming as a country gentleman, and "given to cockfights." In December 1645 he was admitted at Jesus College, Cambridge. Shortly after this he dates his "conversion." In March 1648 he was ill of "a dangerous spotted feavour," and after his recovery "set up a meeting of some schollars for religious purposes," which he continued for some years after he left the university.

== Career ==
He commenced B.A. in 1649, and in the same year received presbyterian ordination at Whitchurch, Shropshire. For about a year he preached in Staffordshire and Cheshire without fixed charge. In 1650 he settled as lecturer every other Sunday at Ashbourne, Derbyshire, preaching on the alternate Sunday in the country round. In the spring of 1652 he became lecturer at Atherstone Chapel in the parish of Mancetter, Warwickshire. He was the "one Macham, a priest in high account," who prescribed physic and bloodletting for George Fox, the quaker founder. On 17 Nov. 1652 he was called to Astbury, Cheshire, as lecturer, and removed from Atherstone in the spring of 1653. At his own cost he set up a "double lecture" in twelve Staffordshire towns on the last Friday in each month. He devised the plan on 31 July 1652, and began its execution on 4 Aug. 1653. The last lecture was delivered on 2 Jan. 1660. John Walker says he was presented to the rectory of Astbury in 1654. This appears erroneous, for "by the coming of another incumbent" (George Moxon) his preaching at Astbury was limited to alternate Sundays, giving him opportunity to pursue his ministry at large. Machin and Moxon lived together at the rectory house. On 17 May 1661 he obtained the perpetual curacy of Whitley Chapel, in the parish of Great Budworth, Cheshire. The Act of Uniformity 1662 ejected him from this cure, but he appears to have remained at Whitley, preaching there and in the neighbourhood until the Conventicle Act 1664 came into force (1 July 1664). He was then in bad health, and removed to Seabridge, where he died of malignant fever on Tuesday, 6 Sept. 1664.

He published nothing, and is known only from A Faithful Narration of his life, published anonymously in 1671, 12mo, with a "prefatory epistle" by Sir Charles Wolseley. According to Philip Henry the author was Henry Newcome of Manchester, who had preceded Machin at Astbury. It is an excellent specimen of later puritan religious biography. It was reprinted in Samuel Clarke's Lives of Sundry Eminent Persons (1683), and republished in 1799, 12mo, with notes, by George Burder, who married a descendant of Machin.

== Family ==
He was buried on 18 Sept. at Newcastle-under-Lyne. He married at Uttoxeter, on 29 Sept. 1653, Jane, daughter of John Butler, and had four or five children, including Samuel (b. 13 Nov. 1654, d. 29 July 1722), John (d. 5 Aug. 1741, aged 82 years and 10 months), and Sarah.
