= John Kidgell =

John Kidgell (1721/2–c.1780) was an English cleric and author. His involvement in 1763 in the Bute administration's efforts to counter the populist John Wilkes led to a public uproar, and he left the country, living abroad for the rest of his life.

== Life ==
Kidgell was educated at Winchester College, and matriculated at Hertford College, Oxford in 1741, graduating B.A. in 1744, and M.A. 1747. In 1747 he was ordained priest by Edmund Gibson, and the following year he became chaplain to the future courtier William Douglas, 3rd Earl of March.

Ralph Freman (Freeman) took on Kidgell as his curate in 1751, at Ayot St Peter, in Hertfordshire; Kidgell preached the first sermon there in the new church built by Freman, on 6 October that year. Much of his time, however, was spent as a man about town in London. He became rector of Woolverston in 1758. In 1762 he was made vicar of Godstone, in the gift of John Garth, and also rector of Horne by Kenrick Clayton.

Obtaining in June 1763, in proof and by paying a printer, a copy of John Wilkes's poem Essay on Woman, Kidgell passed it to the Earl of March, who was then instrumental in setting in motion a prosecution of Wilkes for obscene libel. Kidgell's involvement became public knowledge. He then, against the advice of Philip Carteret Webb who was a government law officer, published A genuine and succinct narrative of a scandalous, obscene, and exceedingly profane libel, entitled ‘An essay on woman’, etc. later in 1763. This attempt at self-justification backfired. A pamphlet war ensued. In the aftermath, John Montagu, 4th Earl of Sandwich had applied pressure to Richard Osbaldeston, the Bishop of London, to reward Kidgell with the living of St James's Church, Piccadilly. Osbaldeston ducked the request, and appointed instead his own chaplain William Parker. Sandwich, heavily involved behind the scenes in the Wilkes case, dropped his support for Kidgell.

Kidgell left Great Britain after his name was brought up in the Wilkes case. He took with him funds from the Godstone turnpike trust. He went initially to the United Provinces, setting up a school in Utrecht. He died around 1780, in poverty.
