= Henry Morley Kidgell =

Australian rules footballer (1881–1948)

Personal information
- Born: 27 March 1881; Sandridge, Victoria
- Died: 30 January 1948 (aged 66); East Melbourne, Victoria
- Original team: Dromana
- Debut: Round 11, 16 July 1904, South Melbourne vs. Geelong, at Lake Oval

Playing career^{1}
Years	Club	Games (Goals)
1904	South Melbourne	5 (0)
- ^{1} Playing statistics correct to the end of 1904.

Henry Morley Kidgell (27 March 1881 – 30 January 1948) was an Australian rules footballer of the early Twentieth Century, playing with South Melbourne Football Club in the Victorian Football League (VFL).

Born in Sandridge, Victoria, the son of building contractor William Kidgell and his wife Hettie Morley, Kidgell attended Scotch College, Melbourne from 1895 to 1898, and played for the Scotch College football team in 1898, helping the club to a premiership. After leaving school, Kidgell played football for Dromana Football Club before his recruitment to South Melbourne.

Kidgell made his debut for South Melbourne in Round 11 1904, against Geelong Football Club at South's home ground, the Lake Oval. Kidgell played five games in 1904 before returning to Dromana.

Following the end of his football career, Kidgell became involved in the Master Carriers' Association of Victoria and served as its president, as well as becoming a mason.

Kidgell died on 30 January 1948.
