= Richard Slate =

English Christian minister (1787–1867)

Richard Slate (1787–1867) was an English Congregational minister, known as a biographical writer.

== Life ==
The son of Thomas Slate, manufacturer of straw hats at 36 Noble Street, London, he was born in London on 10 July 1787. In his 17th year he joined the congregation at Founders' Hall, Lothbury, and became a Sunday school teacher for the London Itinerant Society.

In 1805 Slate entered Hoxton Academy, which he left in 1809 to become minister of the Independent church at Stand, near Manchester, where he was ordained on 19 April 1810. There he remained until September 1826, when he accepted the pastorate of Grimshaw Street Chapel, Preston, Lancashire, a charge which he retained for 35 years.

Slate died at Preston on 10 December 1867, and was buried at Stand.

== Works ==
Slate published:

- Select Nonconformists' Remains: being Original Sermons of Oliver Heywood, Thomas Jollie, Henry Newcome, and Henry Pendlebury. Selected with Memoirs of the authors, Bury, 1814.
- Memoirs of the Rev. Oliver Heywood, Idle, 1825 (the first volume of Oliver Heywood's Works).
- A Brief History of the Lancashire Congregational Union, and of the Blackburn Independent Academy, 1840.

He contributed to Robert Halley's Lancashire Nonconformity and other local history works, and wrote the notices of Richard Frankland's students in Joseph Horsfall Turner's edition of Oliver Heywood's Diaries, vol. iv.

== Family ==
Slate married Ann Watkins in 1810; she died in 1851.

== Notes ==
Attribution

This article incorporates text from a publication now in the public domain: Lee, Sidney, ed. (1897). "Slate, Richard". Dictionary of National Biography. Vol. 52. London: Smith, Elder & Co.
