= Adam Martindale =

British presbyterian minister

Adam Martindale (1623–1686) was a British presbyterian minister, closely involved in the evolution of presbyterianism in Lancashire in the seventeenth century.

== Biography ==
Adam Martindale (1623–1686), fourth son of Henry Martindale, was born at High Heyes, in the parish of Prescot, Lancashire, about 15 September 1623. His father, originally a substantial yeoman and builder, was reduced in circumstances by becoming surety for a friend. Martindale was educated (1630–7) at the grammar schools of St. Helens and Rainford, was put for a short time to his father's business, and then sent back to school (1638–9) in preparation for Oxford. The troubles of the times hindered his going to the university; he became tutor in the family of Francis Shevington at Eccles, and 'would almost as soone have led beares.' Returning home at Christmas 1641, he found his father's business 'quite dead,' owing to the general sense of insecurity. Apprehensive of a summons to 'generall musters,' he obtained employment as schoolmaster at Upholland, and later at Rainford.

A summons to a muster he did not obey, being 'a piece of a clergy-man,' but became in 1642 private secretary to Colonel Moore, M.P. for Liverpool, and head of the parliamentary garrison there, whose household he described as 'an hell upon earth.' He preferred an army clerkship, and rose to be deputy quartermaster, with exemption from military service. He took the Solemn League and Covenant in 1643. On the surrender of Liverpool to Prince Rupert (26 June 1644), he was imprisoned for nine weeks. In August he obtained the mastership of a newly founded grammar school at Over Whitley, Cheshire. The schoolhouse, endowed with £8 a year, was built in 1645, and bore his name inscribed over the door. He resumed his preparation for the university, studying Hebrew, logic, and theology. In the dearth of ministers he was urged to enter the pulpit; he preached first at Middleton, Lancashire, and was offered the post of assistant to the rector, but declined it. He was approved as a preacher by the Manchester committee of ministers appointed in 1644.

=== Gorton Chapel ===
His first charge was at Gorton Chapel in the parish of Manchester, on which he entered in April 1646, a few months before the establishment (2 October) of parliamentary presbyterianism in Lancashire. He resided at Openshaw. Martindale was not a jure divino presbyterian, and at Gorton there were several congregationalists whom he was anxious to keep 'by tendernesse' from seceding. At the first meeting of the Manchester classis on 16 February 1647, he offered himself to be examined for ordination, but did not immediately follow up the application. On 8 July John Angier was deputed to find out why Martindale still held back, 'seeing hee hath professed to have receiv'd satisfaction;' on 2 September he was 'warn'd to appeare at the next meeting,' but did not do so. He was engaged in studying and epitomising the controversy between presbyterianism and independency. Meantime his ministry at Gorton prospered; his popularity is proved by his receipt of calls from six Yorkshire and five Cheshire parishes.

=== Ordination ===
On 7 Oct. 1648 Martindale, having a call from Rostherne, Cheshire, signed by 268 parishioners, was partly examined by the Manchester classis, and his examination approved, his thesis being 'An liceat mere privatis in ecclesia constituta concionari?' The patron of Rostherne, Peter Venables (1604–69), baron of Kinderton, and eleven parishioners objected to him. After protracted negotiation Martindale, tiring of delay, obtained an order (26 March 1649) from the committee for plundered ministers, appointing him to the vicarage (worth £60 a year), and declared himself (10 July) 'unwillinge to proceed any further in this classe touchinge his ordination.' He went up to London, arriving on 23 July; next day the eighth London classis, sitting at St. Andrew's Undershaft, with some demur examined and approved him, and on 25 July 1649 he was ordained, Thomas Manton presiding and preaching the sermon. He dealt handsomely by his predecessor's widow, who occupied the vicarage and glebe till May day 1650.

A meeting of Lancashire and Cheshire ministers was held at Warrington early in 1650, to consider the propriety of taking the engagement (of fidelity to the existing government), subscription to which was demanded by 23 February. Martindale, who was 'satisfied of the usurpation,' reluctantly subscribed. As a preacher he worked hard, having 'a great congregation' twice every Sunday, besides special sermons and a share in nine different associated lectureships. The congregationalists gave him much trouble in his parish. With the regular ministers of that body, such as Samuel Eaton, he was on good terms, in spite of an occasional 'paper scuffle.' It was otherwise with the 'gifted brethren' who visited his parish as itinerant preachers, 'thrusting their sickle into my harvest.' He preached against them, but declined 'to make a chappell into a cockpit' by wrangling discussions. He held, however, two open-air disputations with quakers; in the first, on Christmas Day 1654, he had 'to deale with ramblers and railers;' the second, in 1655, on Knutsford Heath, was with Richard Hubberthorn, whose sobriety of judgment he commends.

=== Exotic presbyterianism ===
Martindale was a presbyterian of the English type, exemplified in Thomas Cartwright and William Bradshaw. The parliamentary presbyterianism approached the Scottish type. This exotic presbyterianism, organised in Lancashire, was never introduced into Cheshire. Nor, until the publication (1653) of Richard Baxter's Worcestershire 'agreement,' which formed the model for other county unions, was there any attempt to form a collective organisation for the puritanism of Cheshire. On 20 October 1653 a 'voluntary association' was formed at Knutsford. It was called a 'classis;' but whereas in the Lancashire 'classes' the lay element (ruling elders) always preponderated, the Cheshire 'classis' consisted solely of ministers, neither episcopalians nor congregationalists being excluded. It claimed no jurisdiction, but met for ordination of ministers, approval of elders (where congregations chose to have them), spiritual exercises and advice. Martindale was a warm advocate of this union. In his own congregation six elders were chosen, but only three agreed to act; the presbyterian system of examination, as a necessary preliminary to communion, he discarded. He kept his people together, though 'the chiefe for parts and pietie leaned much towards the congregationall way.'

Martindale was privy, through Henry Newcome, to the projected rising of the 'new royalists' under Sir George Booth, and strongly sympathised with the movement, which, however, he did not join. He had long declared himself 'for a king and a free parliament,' though expecting to lose his preferment at the Restoration. The act of September 1660 for confirming and restoring ministers 'made me vicar of Rotherston,' he says; nevertheless he was prosecuted in January 1661 for holding private meetings, and imprisoned at Chester for some weeks, but released on his bond of £1,000. A maypole was set up in his parish. He describes how his 'wife, assisted with three young women, whipt it downe in the night with a framing-saw.' At the winter assizes of 1661 he was indicted for refusing to read the prayer-book; it seems he had not refused, for the book had not been tendered to him. The new prayer-book reached Rostherne on Friday, 22 August 1662; on 24 August he was deprived by the Uniformity Act. On that day, however, there was no one to preach, and though he had taken his farewell on the 17th, he officiated again. On 29 August George Hall, bishop of Chester, issued his mandate declaring the church vacant, and inhibiting Martindale from preaching in the diocese.

=== Camp Green ===
At Michaelmas he removed to Camp Green in Rostherne parish, attending the services of his successor (Benjamin Crosse), and 'repeating' his sermons in the evening 'to an housefull of parishioners.' For two years he took boarders; this being unsafe for a nonconformist, he thought of turning to medicine, but eventually, aided by Lord Delamer, he studied and taught mathematics at Warrington and elsewhere. At May day 1666, under pressure of the Five Miles Act, he removed his family to another house in Rostherne, and went to Manchester to teach mathematics. Anglican as well as nonconformist gentry employed him. In furtherance of the education of his son Thomas, he visited Oxford (1668), where he made the acquaintance of John Wallis. For the same purpose he journeyed to Glasgow (April 1670). At this period there seems to have been little attempt in Lancashire to enforce the law against the preaching of nonconformists in the numerous and ill-served chapelries. Martindale preached openly in the chapels of Gorton, Birch, Walmsley, Darwen, Cockey, and in the parishes of Bolton and Bury, Lancashire. His receipts from this source soon enabled him to dispense with taking pupils. He was brought up before Henry Bridgeman, then dean of Chester, and indicted at the Manchester assizes, but found not guilty for lack of evidence. John Wilkins, bishop of Chester, 'proposed terms' in 1671 to the nonconformists, that they might officiate as curates-in-charge, and they were inclined to accept, but Sterne, the archbishop of York, interposed.

=== Chaplain to Lord Delamer ===
On 30 September 1671 Martindale became resident chaplain to Lord Delamer at Dunham, with a salary of £40. He took out a license under the indulgence of 1672 for the house of Humphrey Peacock in Rostherne parish, and there preached twice each Sunday and lectured once a month. He removed his family to The Thorne in 1674, to Houghheath in 1681, and to his own house at Leigh in May 1684. The death of Lord Delamer (10 August 1684) closed his connection with Dunham. He was imprisoned at Chester (27 June – 15 July 1685) on groundless suspicion of complicity with the Monmouth Rebellion; in fact his principles were those of passive obedience, and he had written (but not published) in 1682 an attack on the 'Julian' of Samuel Johnson, which he regarded as 'a very dangerous booke.' Later in 1685 he gave evidence at Lancaster as arbitrator in a civil suit, and came home out of health.

=== Marriage and death ===
Martindale died at Leigh in September 1686, and was buried at Rostherne on 21 September. He married, on 31 December 1646, Elizabeth (who survived him), second daughter of John Hall, of Droylsden, Lancashire, and uterine sister of Thomas Jollie. The couple had eight children, three of whom survived childhood.

== Publications ==
He published:

1. Divinity Knots Unbound 1649, (against antinomianism and anabaptism, dedicated to Captain James Jollie); also with title Divinity Knots Unloosed, 1649.
2. Summary of Arguments for and against Presbyterianisme and Independencie, 1650
3. An Antidote against the Poyson of the Times, 1653, (a catechism, defending the doctrine of the Trinity against heresies then appearing among the independents at Dukinfield, Cheshire).
4. Countrey Almanacke, 1675–6–7 (mentioned in his autobiography).
5. The Countrey-Survey-Book; or Land-Meter's Vade-mecum, 1681; reprinted with addition of his Twelve Problems, 1702
6. Truth and Peace Promoted, 1682, (mentioned in his autobiography and by Calamy on justification).

Communications from him are in Philosophical Transactions Abridged, 1670, i. 539 (extracts from two letters on 'A Rock of Natural Salt' in Cheshire), 1681, ii. 482 (Twelve Problems in Compound Interest and Annuities resolved). In A Collection of Letters for the Improvement of Husbandry and Trade, 1683, by John Houghton (d 1705), are two by Martindale (vol. i. Nos. 6, 11) on Improving Land by Marle, a third (vol. ii. No. 1), A Token for Ship-Boyes; or plain sailing made more plain, and a fourth (vol. ii. No. 4), on Improvement of Mossie Land by Burning and Liming. Besides the animadversions on 'Julian,' a treatise on kneeling at the Lord's Supper (1682) was circulated in manuscript, and a critique on Matthew Smith's Patriarchal Sabbath, 1683, was sent to London for press, but not printed, owing to a dispute between Martindale's agent and the bookseller. Martindale's autobiography, to 1685, was edited in 1845 for the Chetham Society by Canon Parkinson from the autograph in the British Museum, formerly in the possession of Thomas Birch. In addition to its personal interest, it contains sketches of the social life of the period, worthy of Defoe. Its omission of proper names makes many of its allusions obscure.

His autobiography is held at the British Museum.
