= Richard Dugdale (alleged demoniac) =

Richard Dugdale (c.1670 - ??), a domestic gardener and servant from Surey, near Whalley, Lancashire, became notable as a result of the publication of a number of pamphlets describing his apparent possession by the devil, and subsequent exorcism.

== Biography ==
Richard Dugdale, who was born about 1660, was the son of Thomas Dugdale of Surey, near Whalley, Lancashire, a gardener, and servant to Thomas Lister of Westby Hall (near Gisburn) then in Yorkshire. In 1689 (or according to another account about 1694), aged around eighteen, he went to the rushbearing festival at Whalley, and got into a drunken fight with one of the other revellers. On returning to his master's house he professed to have seen apparitions, and the following day, being unwell and lying down, he declared that he had been alarmed by the door opening and a mist entering, followed by various supernatural appearances. Becoming subject to violent fits, Dugdale left his situation and went home, when a physician was called in without benefiting him, as the fits continued and increased.

Dugdale's father now applied to Thomas Jollie, the ejected minister of Altham, who with eight or nine other nonconformist ministers met almost every day at the house and endeavoured to exorcise the devil, which Dugdale affirmed to possess him, by prayer, examination, and fasting, but without result for at least a year. Meanwhile, Dugdale's fame had spread abroad, and he was visited by several thousand persons, some dozens making declarations of his strange condition before Lord Willoughby and other magistrates. It was claimed for Dugdale that he foretold future events, spoke languages of which he was ignorant, and sometimes with two voices at once, was at times wildly blasphemous, and at others preached sermons, that he was possessed of extraordinary strength, and was sometimes ‘as light as a bag of feathers, and at others as heavy as lead,’ that he vomited a large hair broom, and did a number of other miraculous things.

Baxter and Mather were so impressed that they wished to quote his case in their works on witchcraft; but Lord Chief Justice Holt is said to have discovered that the whole affair was an imposition. To late 19th century writer Fishwick, Dugdale seemed to have been "hysterical", and with the aid of his relations to have traded on the credulity of his visitors. A number of pamphlets were written, some denouncing him as a cheat, and others supporting the theory of his demoniacal possession. After the lapse of considerably more than a year the fits left him, and up to 1697, when he was last heard of, he had only had one unimportant return of them.
