= City Line (Merseytravel) =

Railway network brand in the UK

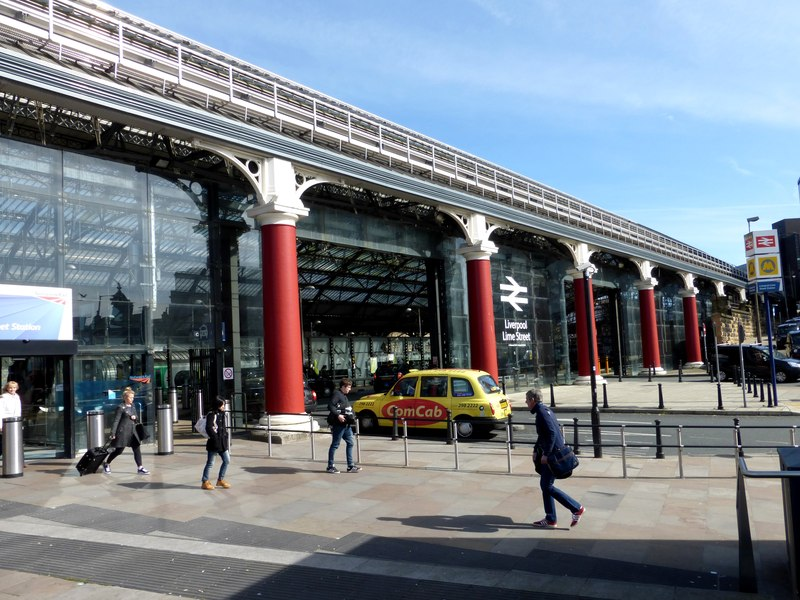
- Exterior of Liverpool Lime Street railway station the terminus for all of the City Lines

Overview
- Status: Operational
- Owner: Network Rail
- Locale: Liverpool City Region (Merseyside and Halton); North West England
- Termini: Liverpool Lime Street; Multiple

Service
- Type: Commuter rail
- System: National Rail

Technical
- Track gauge: 4 ft 8 1/2 in (1,435 mm) standard gauge
- Electrification: 25 kV 50 Hz AC overhead line (partial)

The City Line (sometimes City Lines) is the brand name used by Merseytravel on commuter rail services connecting the Liverpool City Region (Merseyside and Halton) with Greater Manchester, Cheshire, Blackpool and Lancashire starting eastwards from the mainline platforms of Liverpool Lime Street railway station.

The City Line covers most of the Liverpool City Region sections of the Crewe–Liverpool line, the two Liverpool–Manchester lines and the Liverpool–Wigan line, with services continuing to Warrington, Chester via Runcorn and Blackpool and Preston via Wigan.

It is mainly operated by Northern Trains, with additional long-distance services operated by TransPennine Express, Avanti West Coast, East Midlands Railway, Transport for Wales and West Midlands Trains. Unlike the other two Merseytravel-supervised lines, the Merseyrail Northern and Wirral lines, the City Line is not operated by Merseyrail, however most of the line's stations within the Liverpool City Region are in Merseytravel or Merseyrail branding. The line is usually depicted on Merseytravel signage and maps using the colour red.

== History ==
The City Line can trace its origins back to the dawn of the railway era, as it incorporates most of the route of the Liverpool and Manchester Railway, opened in 1830 and including Broad Green Station, the oldest operating station in the world. Other early railway companies whose lines are now part of the City Line include the Cheshire Lines Committee and the London and North Western Railway.

These disparate local railway services were not marketed under a common name until 1972, when Merseyside PTE introduced the Merseyrail brand for services which were operated by British Rail on its behalf. The PTE applied the City Line name to local services out of Liverpool's main station at Lime Street.

Around this time, ambitious plans were floated to electrify parts of the City Line and incorporate it into the Northern line, via the Wapping Tunnel from Edge Hill to Liverpool Central. However, after work started, they were abandoned, and to this day the suburbs of eastern Liverpool have no direct route to other suburbs of the city without changing to the underground network at Lime Street.

In the 1990s, as part of the Government's rail privatisation, the City Line services became part of the North Western Trains franchise (later taken over by FirstGroup and renamed First North Western).

In 2004, the First North Western franchise was merged with that of neighbouring train company Arriva Trains Northern to create a new franchise covering the north of England. The new franchise was won by Northern Rail, owned by the Serco-Abellio consortium (who, coincidentally, had been named as the operators of the Merseyrail Electrics franchise a year earlier).

== Description ==
Merseyrail lines shown in Merseyside
Northern line
Wirral line
MT City Lines
Primary route
Secondary route
Rural route
Goods line
Disused line

The City Line, or City Lines, is a term used by Merseytravel, the local transport authority, to describe the suburban services going eastwards from Liverpool Lime Street, on the following routes:

- Liverpool–Wigan line (and onward to Preston via the West Coast Main Line)
- Liverpool–Manchester lines (Middle and Southern Routes, including the branch to Warrington Bank Quay)
- Crewe–Liverpool line (and onward to Birmingham New Street via the West Coast Main Line)

The services are usually frequent and cover a longer distance, but are less frequent than those on the Merseyrail Northern and Wirral Lines. It is depicted on Merseytravel local rail network maps in red, but it is not operated by Merseyrail (which operate the other two lines), although it still receives funding from Merseytravel. Merseytravel and the combined authority have described the City Line and Merseyrail as separate networks in their rail strategy.

The City Line is part of the Northern franchise not the Merseyrail (Electrics) franchise, and contains 26 stations as of 2000. Merseytravel has had policies in place to develop and invest more in the line, having regular service frequencies and introducing new services. By 2000, Merseytravel has branded the City Lines as part of the Merseyrail network, with local identity, fares and ticketing structures to reflect its policies, despite the City Lines not being operated by Merseyrail. Although by 2022, "Merseyrail" has been limited to only the Northern and Wirral lines in some documentation.

The line is primarily operated by Northern, with other services also provided by TransPennine Express, Avanti West Coast, East Midlands Railway, Transport for Wales and West Midlands Trains (London Northwestern).

== Services ==
Services on the City Line are provided by Northern, TransPennine Express, Avanti West Coast, East Midlands Railway, Transport for Wales, and West Midlands Trains.

Monday to Saturday daytimes, most stations are served by a train every half-hour on core sections of route. Some smaller stations are served only by one train per hour. Services are less frequent in the evenings.

Timetables are produced by Merseytravel. Typical off-peak weekday service is as follows:

City Line
Route	tph	Calling at	Operator
Liverpool Lime Street — Wigan North Western	2	Edge Hill; Wavertree Technology Park; Broad Green; Roby; Huyton; Prescot; Eccleston Park; Thatto Heath; St Helens Central; Garswood; Bryn	Northern Trains
Liverpool Lime Street — Blackpool North	1	Huyton; St Helens Central; Wigan North Western; Euxton Balshaw Lane; Leyland; Preston; Poulton-le-Fylde	Northern Trains
Liverpool Lime Street — Preston	4tpd	St Helens Central, Wigan North Western; trains continue to Glasgow Central	TransPennine Express
Liverpool Lime Street — Manchester Victoria	1	Lea Green; trains continue to Hull	TransPennine Express
Liverpool Lime Street — Manchester Victoria	1	Newton-le-Willows; trains continue to Newcastle via York	TransPennine Express
Liverpool Lime Street — Manchester Airport	1	Edge Hill; Wavertree Technology Park; Broad Green; Roby; Huyton; Whiston; Rainhill; Lea Green; St Helens Junction; Earlestown; Newton-le-Willows; Patricroft; Eccles; Deansgate; Manchester Oxford Road; Manchester Piccadilly; Mauldeth Road; Burnage; East Didsbury; Gatley; Heald Green	Northern Trains
Liverpool Lime Street — Manchester Oxford Road	1/2	Edge Hill; Mossley Hill; West Allerton; Liverpool South Parkway; Hough Green; Warrington West; Warrington Central; Padgate; Birchwood; Glazebrook; Irlam; Flixton; Chassen Road; Urmston; Deansgate	Northern Trains
Liverpool Lime Street — Manchester Oxford Road	1/2	Edge Hill; Mossley Hill; West Allerton; Liverpool South Parkway; Hough Green; Warrington West; Warrington Central; Padgate; Birchwood; Irlam; Flixton; Urmston; Humphrey Park; Trafford Park; Deansgate	Northern Trains
Liverpool Lime Street — Warrington Central	1	Mossley Hill; West Allerton; Liverpool South Parkway; Hunts Cross; Halewood; Hough Green; Widnes; Sankey for Penketh (2tpd); Warrington West	Northern Trains
Liverpool Lime Street — Manchester Piccadilly	1	Liverpool South Parkway; Warrington Central; Birchwood; Irlam; Urmston; Manchester Oxford Road; train continues to Cleethorpes via Sheffield	TransPennine Express
Liverpool Lime Street — Manchester Piccadilly	1	Liverpool South Parkway; Widnes; Warrington Central; Manchester Oxford Road; trains continue to Nottingham and Norwich	East Midlands Railway
Liverpool Lime Street — Crewe	1	Liverpool South Parkway; Runcorn; Acton Bridge; Hartford; Winsford; trains continue to Birmingham New Street	London Northwestern Railway
Liverpool Lime Street — Crewe	1	Mossley Hill; Liverpool South Parkway; Runcorn; trains continue to Birmingham New Street	London Northwestern Railway
Liverpool Lime Street — Crewe	1	Runcorn; trains continue to London Euston	Avanti West Coast
Liverpool Lime Street — Crewe	1	Liverpool South Parkway; Runcorn; trains continue to London Euston	Avanti West Coast
Liverpool Lime Street — Chester	1	Liverpool South Parkway; Runcorn; Frodsham; Helsby; trains continue to Llandudno	Transport for Wales Rail

== Branding ==
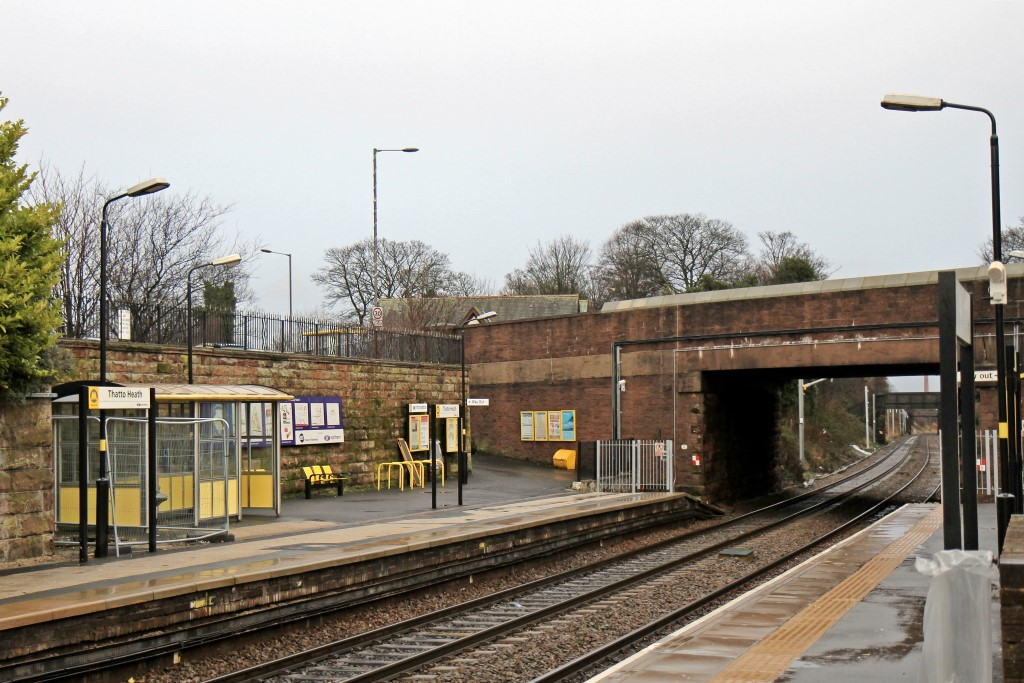
Thatto Heath station on the electrified Liverpool to Wigan City Line. The station is branded Merseyrail with trains operated by Northern Trains.

Merseytravel's local rail network map shows how the Liverpool City Region and its immediate neighbours are served by the various local rail services. It displays the Merseyrail Northern and Wirral Lines alongside the City Line, with contact details for Merseyrail, plus Northern Trains and all of the individual operators who provide services on the City Line. Due to the division between local transport operator Merseytravel and regional franchise operator Northern Trains, the City Line is inconsistently branded. Timetables published by Merseytravel displayed at stations use the City Line branding referring to several operators, whilst Northern Trains (and other operators using parts of the same routes) do not refer to the line in their own publicity or onboard trains. Additionally, main line stations operated by Merseytravel carry Merseyrail branding, despite being separate from the electric rapid transit/commuter network and being absent from some official Merseyrail maps.

== Future ==
=== Electrification of the City Line ===
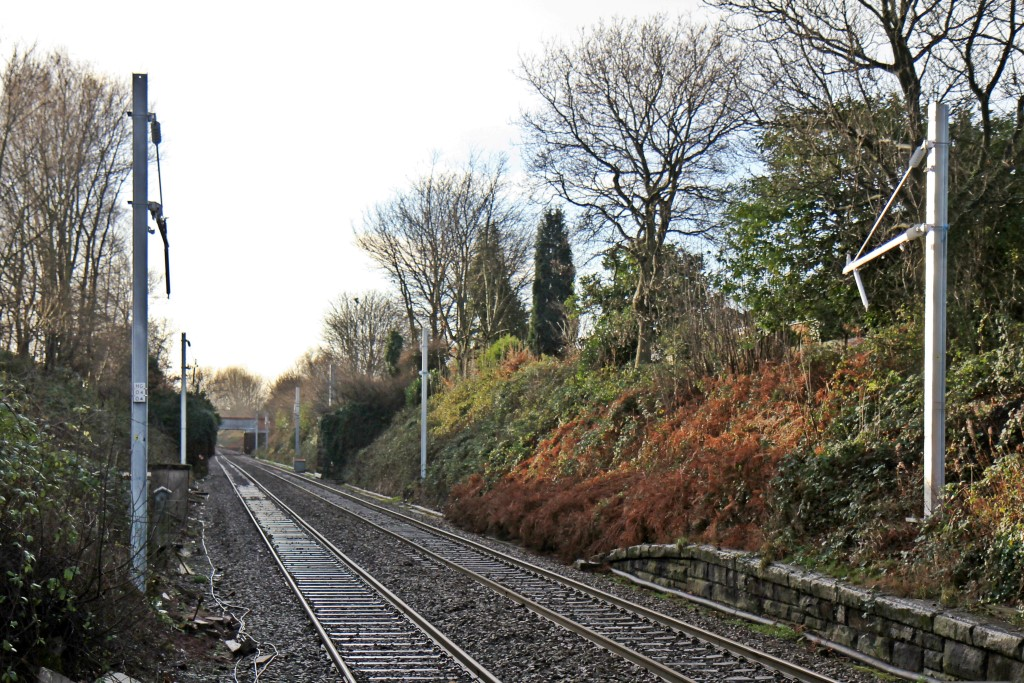
Partially erected catenary at Eccleston Park, in December 2013.

Formerly the only section of City Line route electrified was between Lime Street and Liverpool South Parkway, which is used by Avanti West Coast and London Northwestern Railway Electric Multiple Units. The line from Liverpool to Manchester via Newton-le-Willows was electrified, along with the Liverpool–Wigan line, opening in early 2015.

Four electrified tracks are operative from Broad Green Station to Huyton Station. This is to allow a fast uninterrupted service from Liverpool to Manchester and slower electric urban trains to operate on segregated tracks from Liverpool to Wigan. Merseyrail City Line trains run on this section of track. Northern Trains operate the trains on this electrified section of tracks.

==== Bootle branch line ====
The Canada Dock Branch line, also known as the Bootle branch line, is a line running from Edge Hill Junction in the east of the city in a long curve to Canada Dock in the north of the city. The line meets Merseyrail's Northern Line at a junction between Bank Hall and Bootle Oriel Road stations. The line's last remaining passenger services were withdrawn in 1977, however the line remains busy with freight to Seaforth Dock and its container terminal and Liverpool2 container terminal.

If the line was reopened to passengers, it would allow the reopening of stations along its length: Spellow, Walton & Anfield, Breck Road, Tuebrook, Stanley and Edge Lane. The line from Edge Lane would continue through to Edge Hill station and terminate at Lime Street.

Network Rail have investigated options for the Canada Dock Branch in their Route Utilisation Strategy for Merseyside and have concluded that the expected benefits do not justify the investment in new infrastructure. It had been suggested that Liverpool F.C. could assist in funding the reopening of this line to provide a direct link to their proposed extension of the Anfield stadium.

The Department for Transport's Rail electrification document of July 2009, states that the route to Liverpool Docks will be electrified. The Canada Dock Branch Line is the only line into the docks. From the document:

70. Electrification of this route will offer electric haulage options for freight.
There will be an alternative route to Liverpool docks for electrically-operated freight trains, and better opportunities of electrified access to the proposed freight terminal at Parkside near Newton-le-Willows.

The electrification of this line would greatly assist in recommissioning passenger trains, as costs would be reduced.
