= SHJ =

SHJ may refer to:

- SHJ, the IATA code for Sharjah International Airport, United Arab Emirates
- SHJ, the National Rail code for St Helens Junction railway station, Merseyside, England
