= Broad Green railway station =

Railway station in Liverpool, England

Coordinates: 53.4065°N 2.8935°W

Broad Green
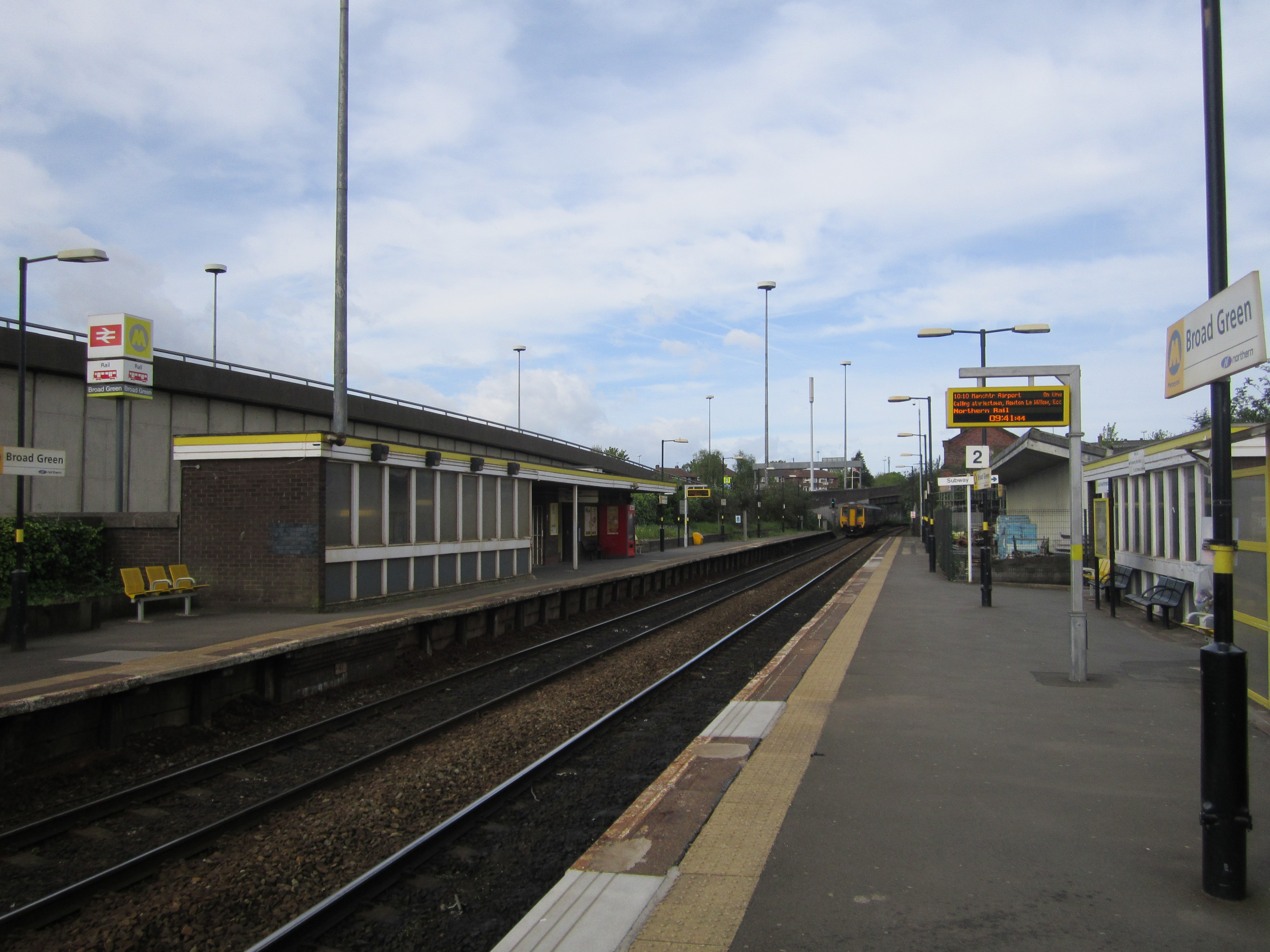
- The station in 2012, facing the M62 bridge

General information
- Location: Broadgreen, Liverpool; England
- Grid reference: SJ406903
- Manager: Northern Trains
- Transit authority: Merseytravel
- Platforms: 2

Other information
- Station code: BGE
- Fare zone: C1
- Classification: DfT category E

History
- Original company: Liverpool and Manchester Railway
- Pre-grouping: London and North Western Railway
- Post-grouping: London, Midland and Scottish Railway

Key dates
- 15 September 1830: Station opened

Passengers
- 2021/22: ▲0.305 million
- 2022/23: ▲0.368 million
- 2023/24: ▼0.365 million
- 2024/25: ▲0.416 million
- 2025/26: ▲0.493 million
Location
Notes
- Passenger statistics from the Office of Rail and Road

Broad Green railway station is a railway station serving the Broadgreen district of Liverpool, England, 3 1/2 miles (5.6 km) east of Liverpool Lime Street. Established in 1830, it is one of the world's oldest actively operating railway stations.

== History ==
The oldest passenger terminus station in the world was Crown Street railway station on the Liverpool and Manchester passenger railway opening on 17 September 1830. The trains set out on the first day at the Liverpool end. The second station on the line was the original Edge Hill railway station, the third was Broad Green station. In 1836 Crown Street station was demolished and Edge Hill decommissioned. A new Edge Hill station opened to the north of the original station in the grounds of the Edge Hill junction. This leaves Broad Green station as the oldest used railway station in the world. The current station buildings are not original, dating from 1972.

On 5th March 2015 electric services began running from Liverpool to Manchester Victoria, and later to Wigan NW, Preston and Blackpool.

About 110 yards (100 m) to the east of the station the abandoned North Liverpool Extension Line passes under the lines, which is currently part of the Trans Pennine Trail.

== Facilities ==
The ticket office is located on the Liverpool-bound platform (platform 1) and like most Merseytravel-sponsored stations is staffed throughout the hours of service, seven days per week. A waiting shelter is provided on platform 2 and there are digital display screens and customer help points provided on both sides. The platforms are linked by a subway with steps, but level access is available to both sides via nearby streets.

Merseytravel announced in April 2019 that they had been successful in a bid for funding lifts being installed at the station under the Department for Transport's ‘Access for All’ programme. The lifts are expected to be installed at some point over the following five years.

The station is located very close to junction 4 of the M62 motorway however it is not a 'parkway' or an 'interchange' station. It has recently introduced a 'Park and Ride' scheme, with a large car park situated on the south side of the station. Broadgreen Hospital is a little under half a mile away.

== Services ==
This station is operated and managed by Northern. The station receives three trains per hour in each direction Monday-Saturday, during the off-peak.

- 3 trains per hour to Liverpool Lime Street, calling at Wavertree Tech Park and Edge Hill.
- 1 tph to Manchester Airport, via Lea Green, Newton-le-Willows and Manchester Piccadilly.
- 2 trains per hour to Wigan North Western via St Helens Central.

During peak hours, additional services operate to Manchester Victoria and Blackpool North via Preston.

On Sundays, there are 2 trains per hour in each direction, with the Wigan NW service extending to Blackpool North, and the Manchester Airport service extending to Wilmslow.

Preceding station	National Rail	Following station
Wavertree Technology Park	Northern Trains Liverpool–Wigan line	Roby
Wavertree Technology Park	Northern Trains Liverpool Lime Street to Manchester Airport via Chat Moss	Roby

== Gallery ==
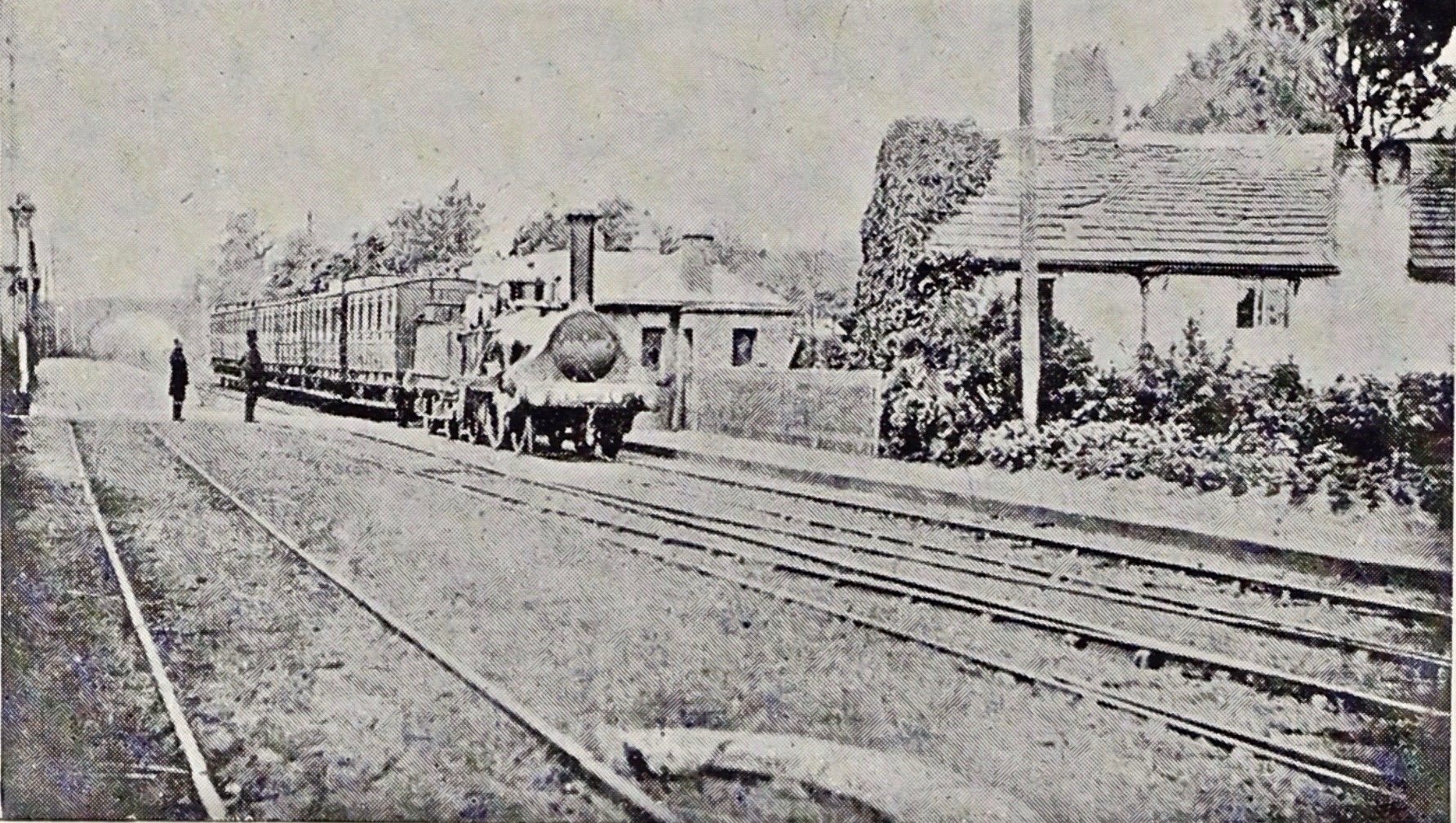
1865 postcard of Broad Green

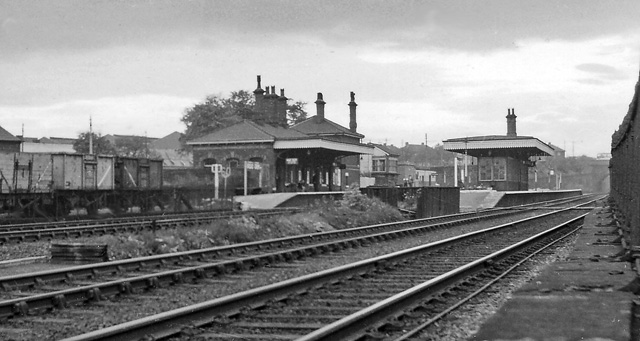
The view westward, towards Liverpool Lime Street in 1962.

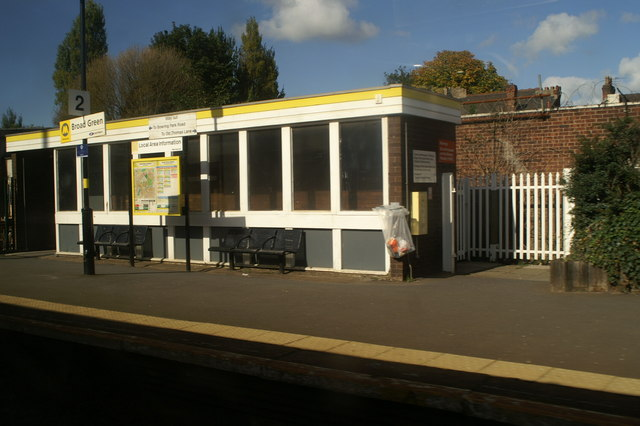
The station's waiting room

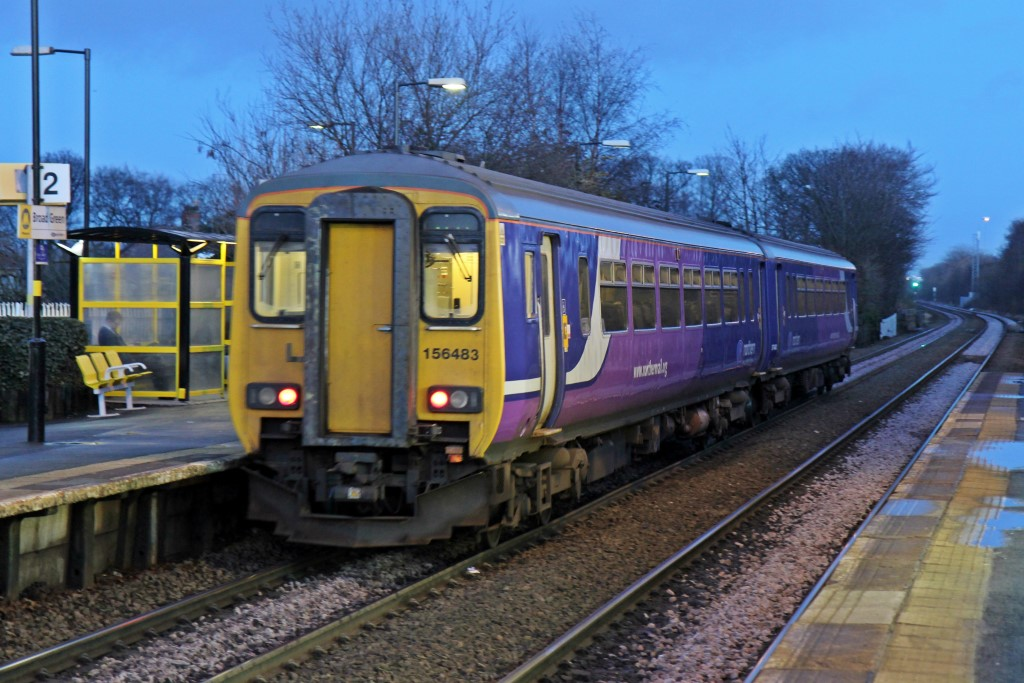
A Northern Rail Class 156 waits at the station.

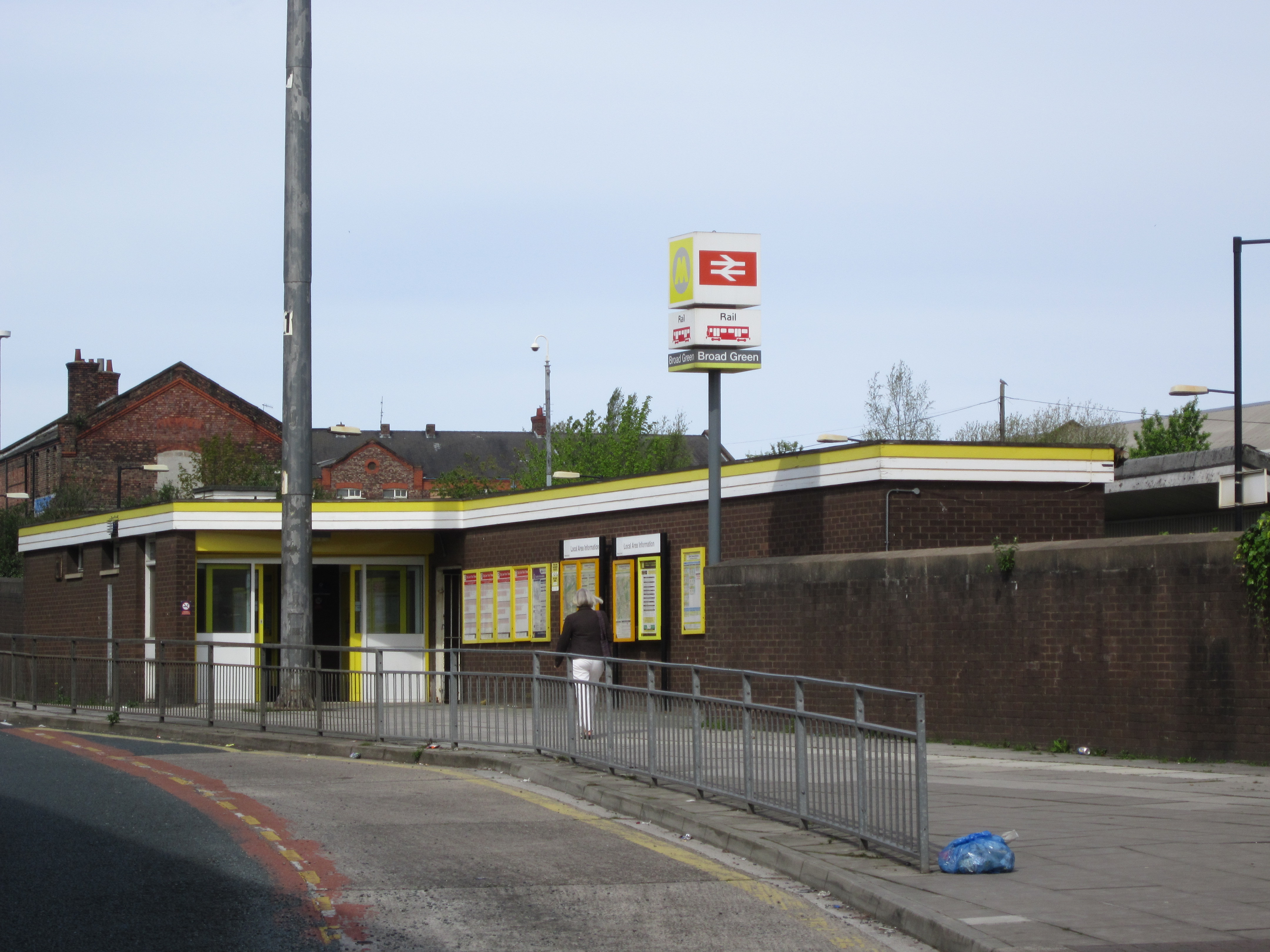
The booking office, from the street.

Preceding station	National Rail	Following station
Wavertree Technology Park	Northern Trains; Liverpool-Manchester Line	Roby
Wavertree Technology Park	Northern Trains; Liverpool-Wigan Line	Roby
	Disused railways	
Edge Lane	LNWR; Olive Mount chord	Terminus
