= Hays Chemicals =

Coordinates: 53.439359°N 2.713192°W

Hays Chemicals had a factory in the Sutton area of St Helens, England.

The factory was controversial, locally, for actual and feared escapes of toxic chemicals.

The factory was the last customer to use the remains of the St Helens and Runcorn Gap Railway's original main line. Trains accessed the factory from the north, leaving the Liverpool to Wigan Line at St Helens Central Station Junction and travelling through Peasley Cross. In its final years the tracks south of the factory had been lifted.

Hays closed in April 2002. Trains continued until 27 September of that year. The factory has since been levelled.

The track was left in place after closure. At August 2015 it was plainly visible heading away southeast from the south end of St Helens Central, though pallisade fencing crosses the line.
