= Lea Green railway station =

Railway station in England

Coordinates: 53.427°N 2.724°W

Lea Green
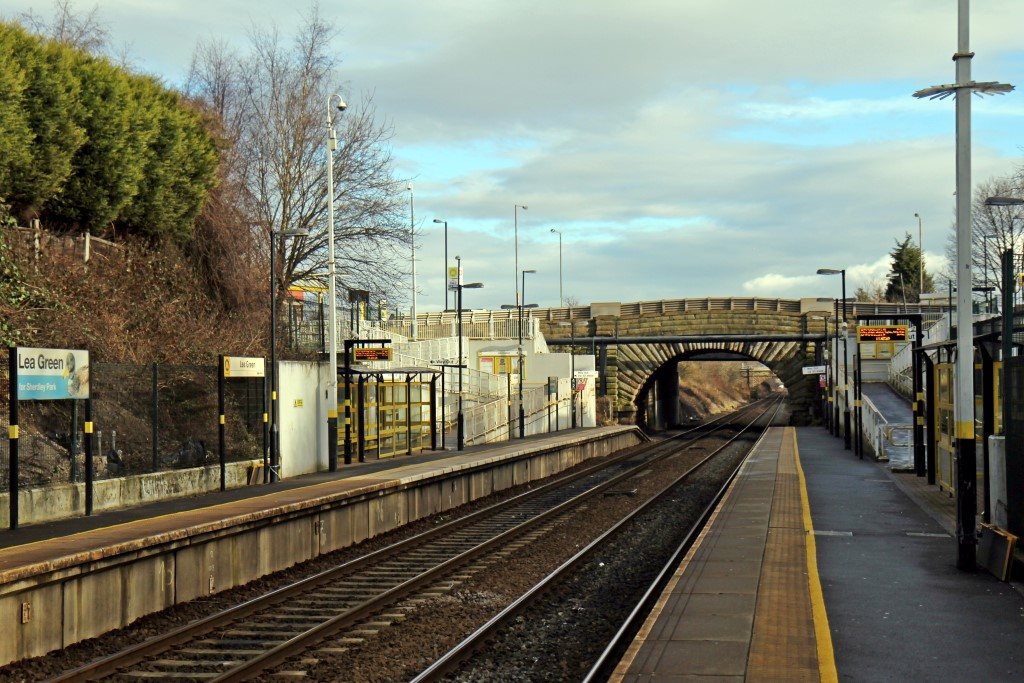
- The station in 2014 prior to electrification

General information
- Location: Sutton, Merseyside, St Helens; England
- Grid reference: SJ519924
- Manager: Northern Trains
- Transit authority: Merseytravel
- Platforms: 2

Other information
- Station code: LEG
- Fare zone: A1
- Classification: DfT category E

Key dates
- 17 September 2000: Opened

Passengers
- 2020/21: ▼82,028
- 2021/22: ▲0.338 million
- 2022/23: ▲0.340 million
- 2023/24: ▼0.319 million
- 2024/25: ▲0.401 million
Location
Notes
- Passenger statistics from the Office of Rail and Road

Lea Green railway station is in St Helens, Merseyside, England, three miles south of the town centre near the suburb of Clock Face. The station is on the electrified northern route of the two Liverpool to Manchester lines, 10 3/4 miles (17 km) east of Liverpool Lime Street. Northern Trains operates the station with Merseytravel sponsorship displaying Merseytravel signs. Constructed in 2000, the station has a park and ride car park fitted with charging points for electrically-powered vehicles, a modern CCTV security system and a booking office at street level.

== History ==
The first Lea Green station was where Lowfield Lane met Lea Green Road (SJ510920 about 950 metres towards Liverpool from the current station) It opened in 1830 on the Liverpool and Manchester Railway. The early intermediate stations were little more than halts positioned where the railway crossed a road or turnpike accounting for variations in their names. Lea Green station was probably known as Top of Sutton Incline, then Sutton by 1844, and Lea Green again in 1848, although Butt (1995) says it was Lea Green before becoming Sutton. The first station closed on 7 March 1955.

The current station in the cutting at Marshalls Cross opened on 17 September 2000.

Thatto Heath railway station on the Liverpool to Wigan Line is approximately two miles to the north west.

== Facilities ==
The ticket office is staffed each day from 06:00 to midnight (except Sundays, when it opens at 08:30). Shelters are provided on each platform, along with help points, digital information screens and timetable poster boards. Both platforms have step-free access from the ticket office and station entrance via ramps.

In March 2021, it was announced that a new station building with ticket office, waiting room, and toilets would be built, along with a multi-story car park increasing parking spaces at the station to 450. These finally opened after delays on 18 August 2025.

== Services ==
Northern Trains operates an hourly service to Liverpool Lime Street and an hourly service to Manchester Airport via Manchester Piccadilly. There are peak time services to Manchester Vic and Wigan North Western.

Sunday services see the service to Manchester Airport extended to Wilmslow.

Services are operated by three-car Class 331 electric units and Class 323 units now also appear regularly.

TransPennine Express also serve the station with an express service to Liverpool Lime Street each hour, along with a service to Hull via Leeds. These are operated using "Nova 1" Class 802s and Class 185s. There is also a service to Newcastle and Scarborough early AM and late PM using Class 802.

Preceding station	National Rail	Following station
Rainhill	Northern Trains; Liverpool to Manchester Line	St Helens Junction
Liverpool Lime Street	TransPennine Express; North TransPennine	Manchester Victoria
