= Eccleston Park railway station =

Railway station in Merseyside, England

Eccleston Park
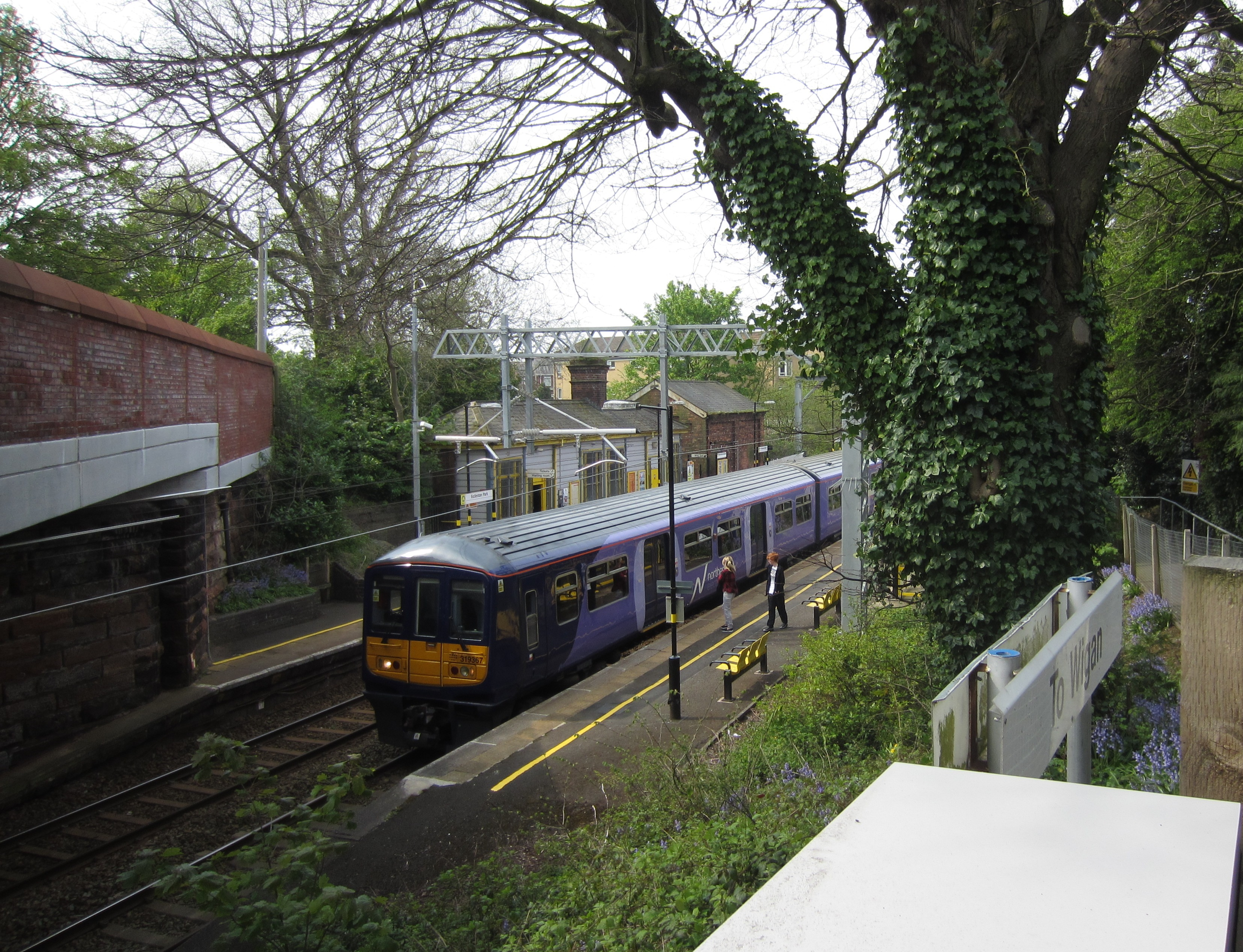
- Wigan-bound Northern Electrics British Rail Class 319 EMU at Eccleston Park

General information
- Location: Eccleston Park, Prescot; England
- Coordinates: 53.4307°N 2.7805°W
- Grid reference: SJ482929
- Manager: Northern Trains
- Transit authority: Merseytravel
- Platforms: 2

Other information
- Station code: ECL
- Fare zone: A2
- Classification: DfT category E

History
- Original company: London and North Western Railway
- Pre-grouping: London and North Western Railway
- Post-grouping: London, Midland and Scottish Railway

Key dates
- July 1891: Station opened

Passengers
- 2020/21: ▼18,200
- 2021/22: ▲58,104
- 2022/23: ▲59,122
- 2023/24: ▲67,274
- 2024/25: ▲74,390
Location
Notes
- Passenger statistics from the Office of Rail and Road

Eccleston Park railway station serves the Eccleston Park area of Prescot, Merseyside, England. It is situated on the electrified Merseytravel Liverpool to Wigan City Line, 8 3/4 miles (14.1 km) northeast of Liverpool Lime Street. The station, and all trains serving it, are operated by Northern Trains, however the station is branded Merseytravel using Merseytravel ticketing. It was opened by the London and North Western Railway in July 1891.

Electrification of this line was given the go-ahead in November 2010. On 17 May 2015, electric train services began on the Liverpool to Wigan Line, operating Class 319 electric multiple units.

== Facilities ==
Though run by Northern Trains, it is within the Merseytravel area and thus has a ticket office that is staffed throughout the hours of service each day (05:50-23:30 Mondays to Saturdays; closed Sundays). This is located in the main building on platform 1, along with a waiting room whilst there is a shelter on platform 2. Train running information is provided via customer help points, PIS screens and timetable poster boards on each platform. Step-free access is available to both platforms via ramps.

== Services ==
During Monday to Saturday daytimes, Eccleston Park is served by trains every 30 minutes each way between Liverpool Lime Street and Wigan North Western.

Since 10 December 2017, there has been an hourly service on Sundays, to Blackpool North northbound and Liverpool Lime Street southbound.

== Gallery ==
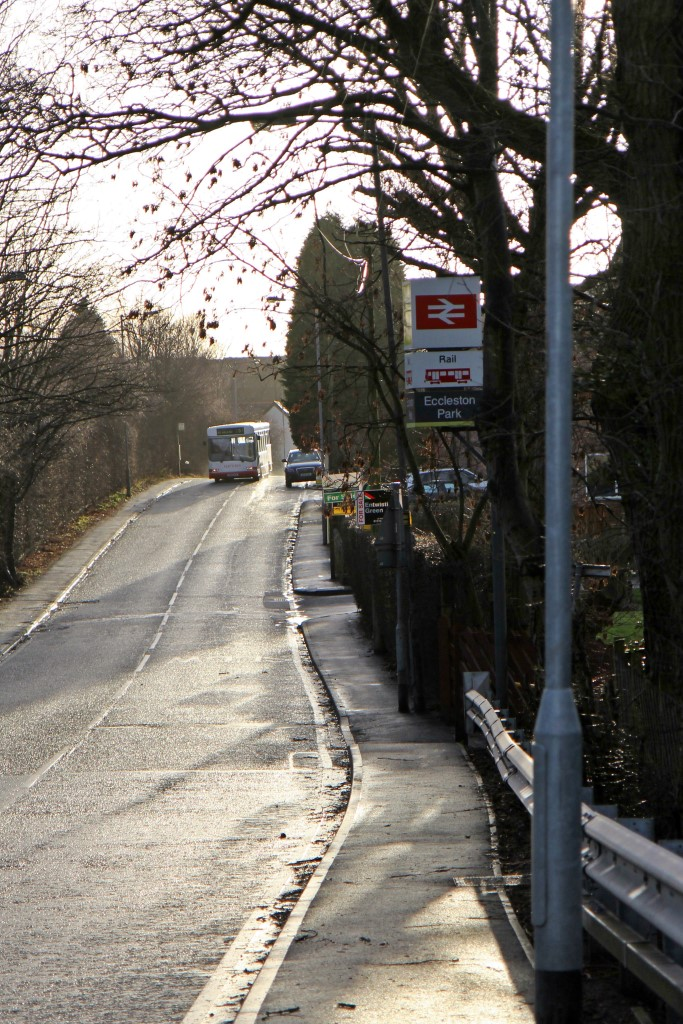
The station entrance on Portico Lane.

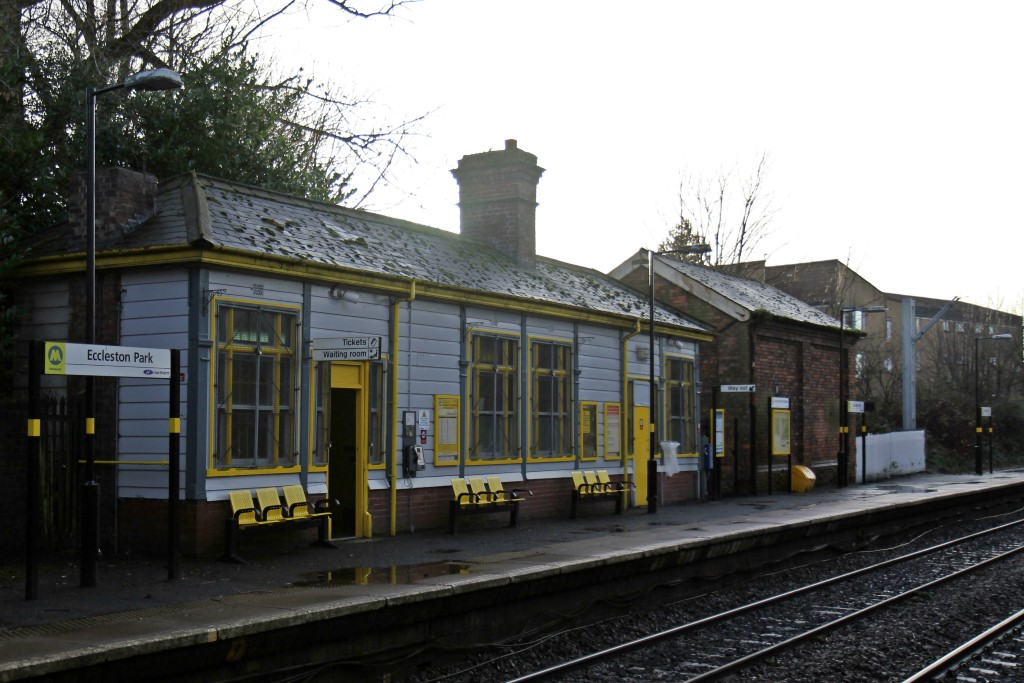
The station booking office and waiting room.

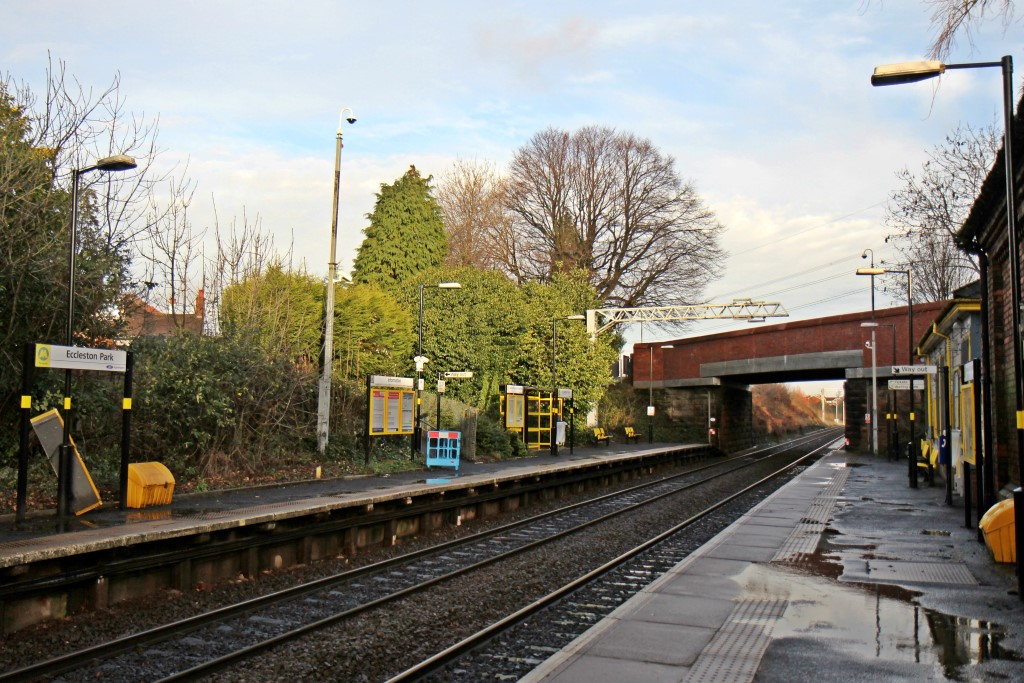
The platforms and Portico Lane bridge.

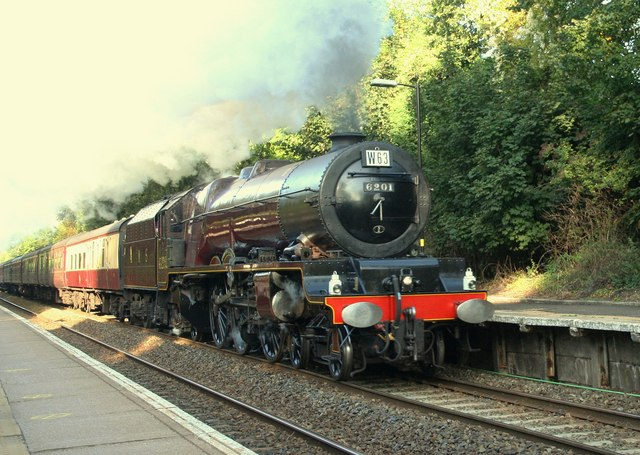
LMS Stanier 4-6-2 "Princess Elizabeth" 6201 powers through the station on a heritage railtour.

Preceding station	National Rail	Following station
Prescot	Northern Trains; Liverpool to Wigan Line	Thatto Heath
