= Prescot railway station =

Railway station in Merseyside, England

Prescot
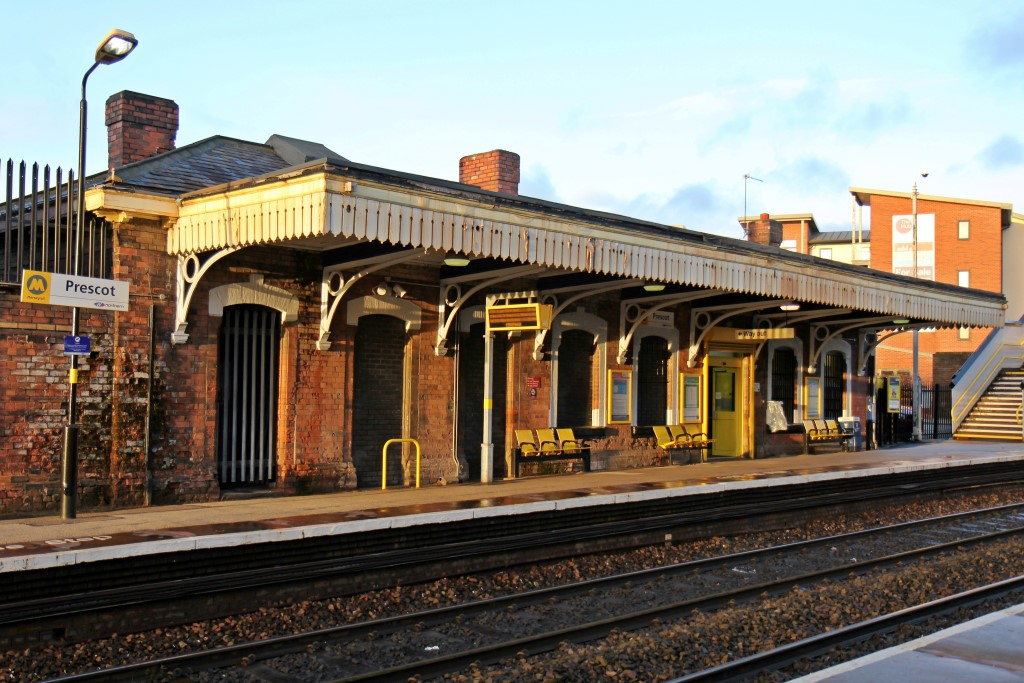

General information
- Location: Prescot, Metropolitan Borough of Knowsley, England
- Coordinates: 53.4236°N 2.7989°W
- Grid reference: SJ470921
- Managed by: Northern Trains
- Transit authority: Merseytravel
- Platforms: 2

Other information
- Station code: PSC
- Fare zone: A3/C2/C3
- Classification: DfT category E

History
- Original company: London and North Western Railway
- Pre-grouping: London and North Western Railway
- Post-grouping: London, Midland and Scottish Railway

Key dates
- 1 January 1872: Station opened

Passengers
- 2020/21: ▼77,728
- 2021/22: ▲0.210 million
- 2022/23: ▲0.235 million
- 2023/24: ▲0.275 million
- 2024/25: ▲0.293 million
Location
Notes
- Passenger statistics from the Office of Rail and Road

Prescot railway station serves the town of Prescot, in Merseyside, England. It is situated on the electrified Liverpool to Wigan Line. The station and all trains serving it are operated by Northern Trains.

== History ==
It was opened in 1871 by the London and North Western Railway. Train services on the line originally consisted of coaches hauled by steam powered locomotives. During the 1960s, operation was changed to diesel multiple unit trains and this continued until May 2015, when Class 319 electric multiple units began public service on the line.

== Facilities ==
The station is staffed throughout the day, from 15 minutes prior to the start of service until 23:30 each day, including Sundays. The ticket office and main buildings are on the northbound platform, with a shelter on the opposite side. Train running information is provided via timetable posters and digital information screens; there are also customer help points on both platforms. Step-free access is available to each platform, though the footbridge linking the two has stairs.

It was announced in February 2020 that the station would benefit from a £20 million grant towards accessibility improvements to the station and footbridge, including new lifts, accessible toilets and customer information screens. These works commenced in spring 2020.

== Services ==
Prescot is served by trains every 30 minutes between Liverpool Lime Street and Wigan North Western, with some early evening peak period and late evening trains continuing to Preston or Blackpool North. On Sundays, the service is hourly in each direction, with trains running through to Preston and Blackpool.

Preceding station	National Rail	Following station
Huyton	Northern Trains; Liverpool to Wigan Line	Eccleston Park

== Gallery ==
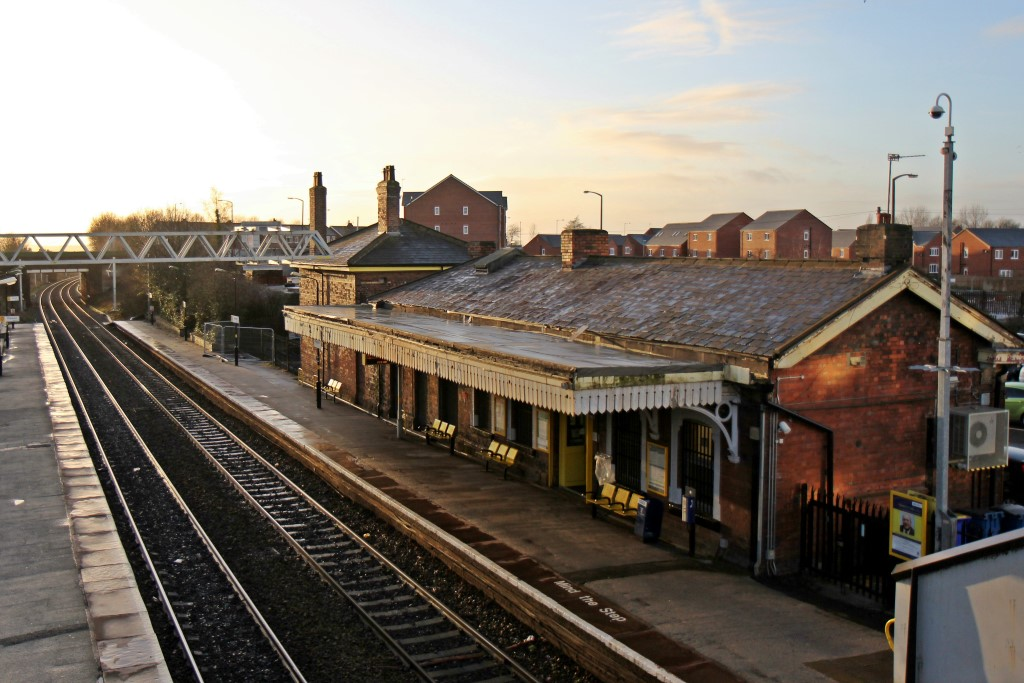
The station booking office, viewed from the footbridge.

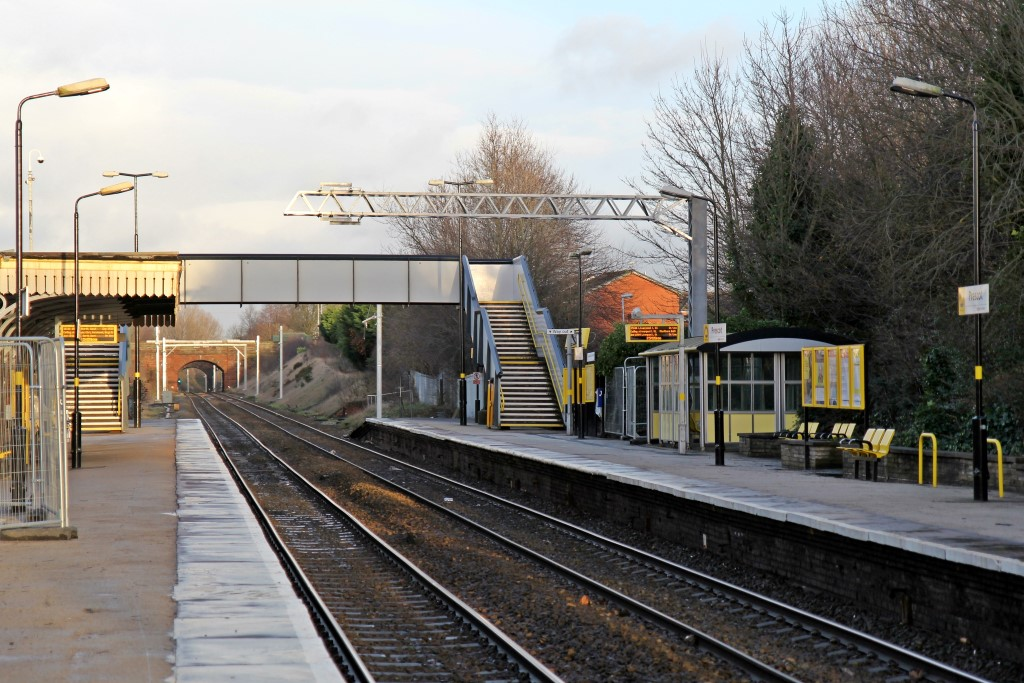
The station footbridge, with new catenary masts visible beyond.

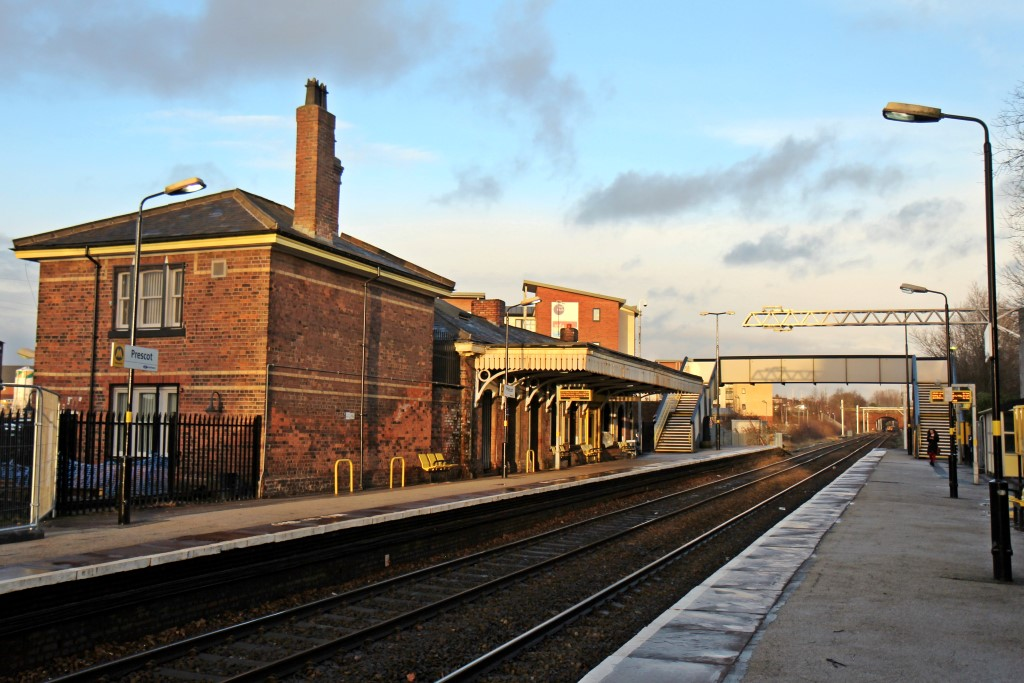
The station buildings.

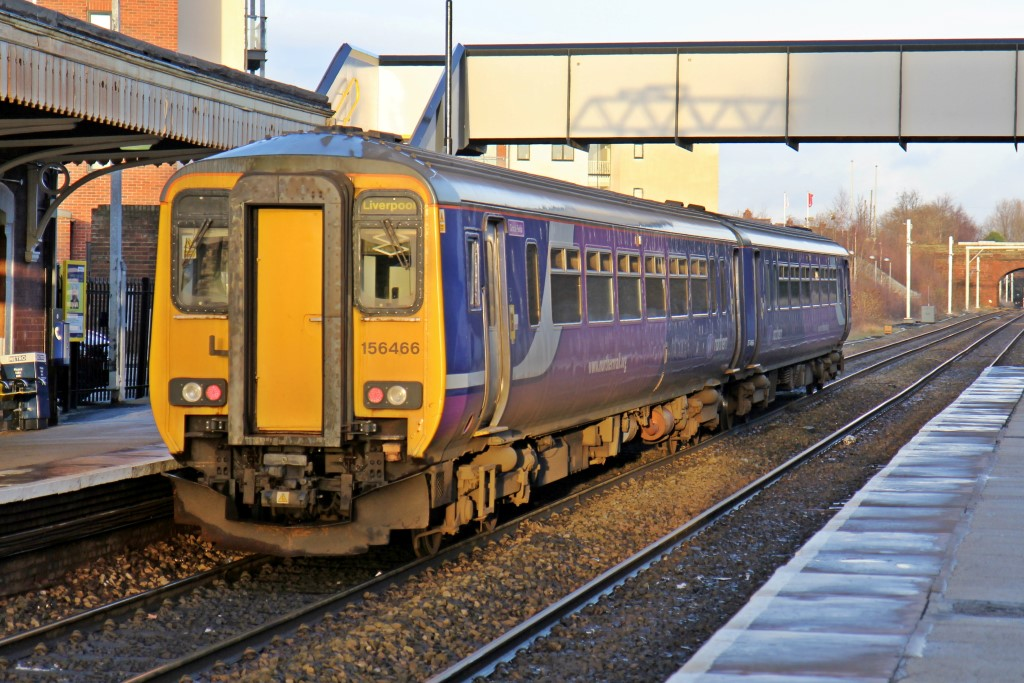
A Northern Rail Class 156 departs from the station.
