= Thatto Heath railway station =

Railway station in Merseyside, England

Thatto Heath
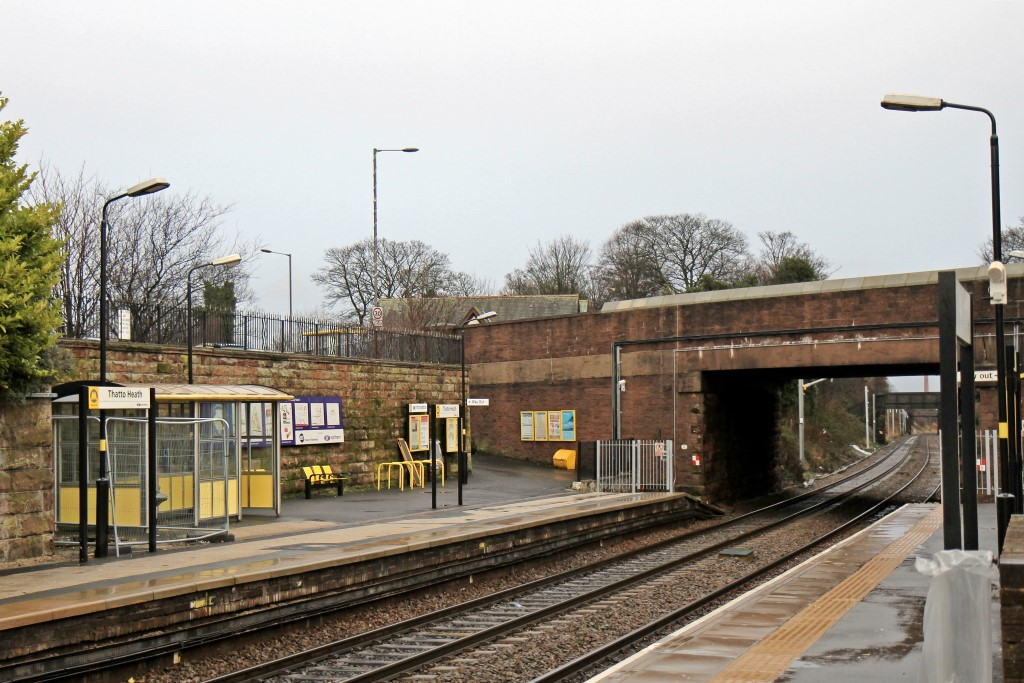
- The station in 2013 prior to electrification

General information
- Location: Thatto Heath, St Helens; England
- Coordinates: 53.4367°N 2.7594°W
- Grid reference: SJ496936
- Managed by: Northern Trains
- Transit authority: Merseytravel
- Platforms: 2

Other information
- Station code: THH
- Fare zone: A1/A2
- Classification: DfT category E

History
- Opened: 1871

Passengers
- 2020/21: ▼36,768
- 2021/22: ▲98,782
- 2022/23: ▲0.115 million
- 2023/24: ▲0.142 million
- 2024/25: ▲0.149 million
Location
Notes
- Passenger statistics from the Office of Rail and Road

Thatto Heath railway station is located in the Thatto Heath area of St Helens, Merseyside, England. It is situated on the electrified Merseytravel Liverpool to Wigan City Line, 9 3/4 miles (15.7 km) northeast of Liverpool. The station, and all trains serving it, are operated by Northern Trains, however the station is branded Merseytravel using Merseytravel ticketing. The station opened with the line in 1871.

== Facilities ==
The station has a small wooden ticket office on the northbound platform, which is staffed from beginning to end of service each day (including Sundays). There are also waiting shelters on both platforms, along with customer help points, digital information screens and timetable posters. Step-free access is available on each side, via ramps from the road above.

== Services ==
During Monday to Saturday daytimes, Thatto Heath is served by trains every 30 minutes between Liverpool Lime Street and Wigan North Western. Some afternoon peak and late evening trains continue to Preston and Blackpool North. The service frequency also drops to hourly in the evenings.

On Sundays the service is hourly in each direction, with trains extending beyond Wigan to Preston and Blackpool North.

== Gallery ==
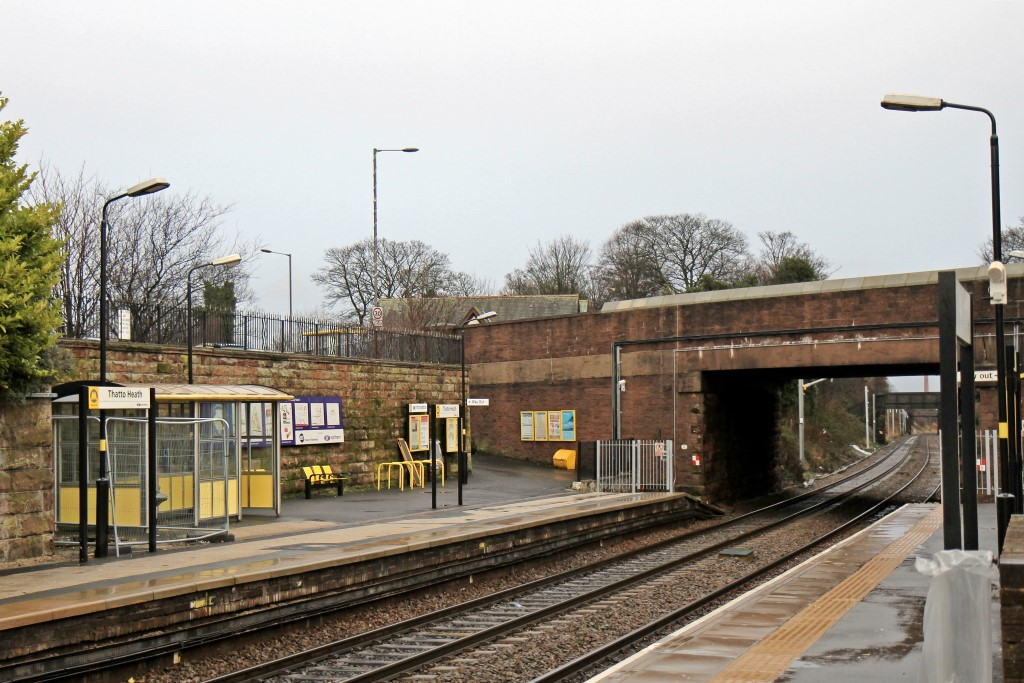
The Wigan-bound platform.

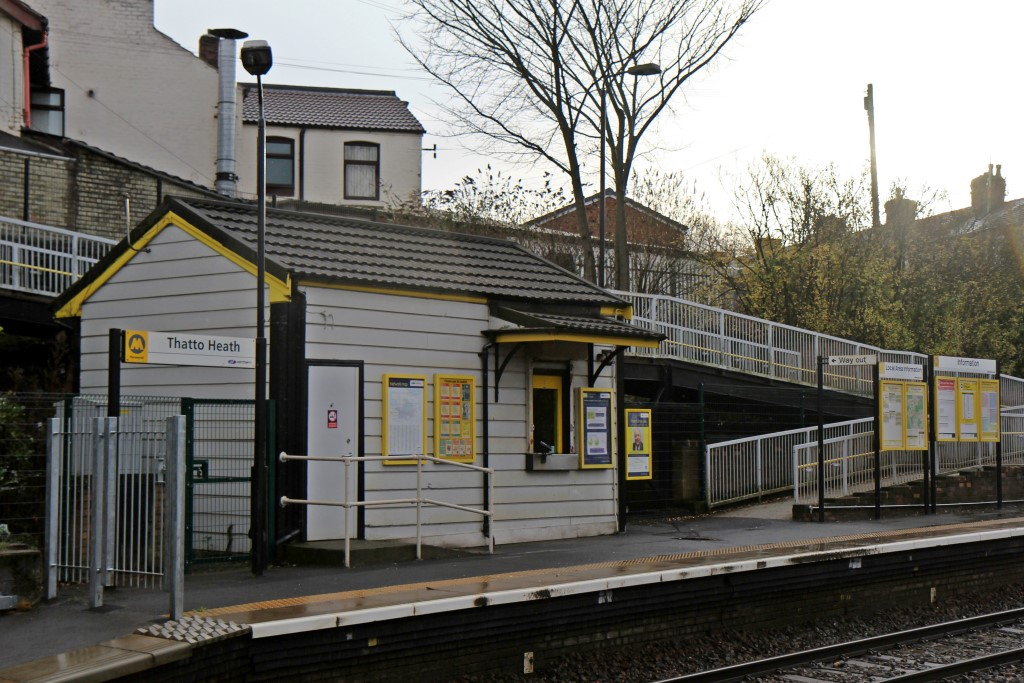
The station booking office.

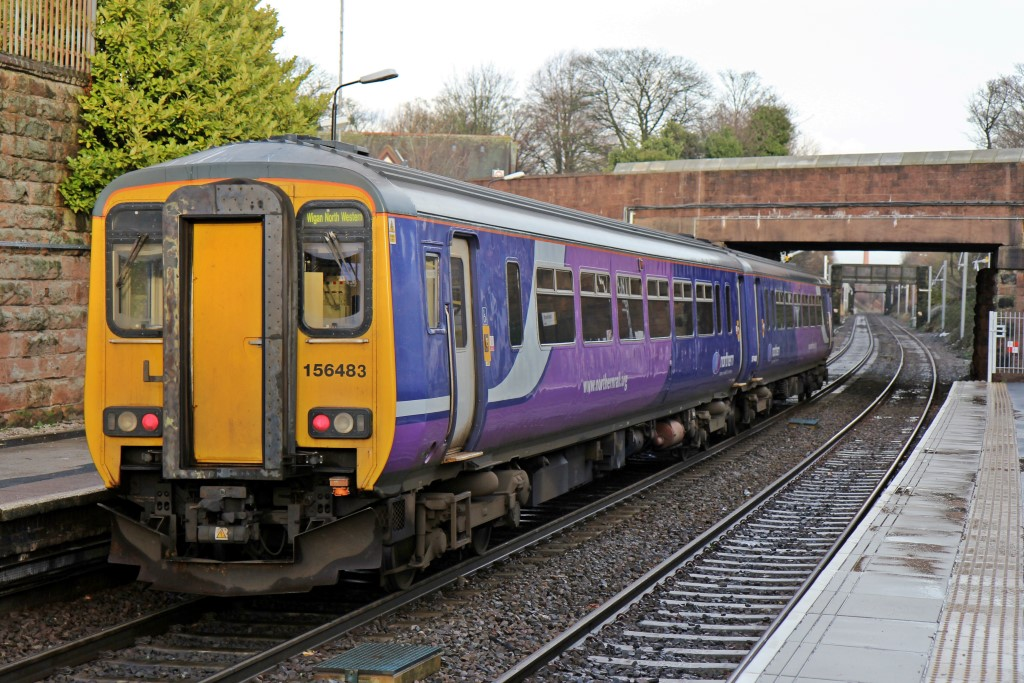
A Northern Rail Class 156 waits at the station.

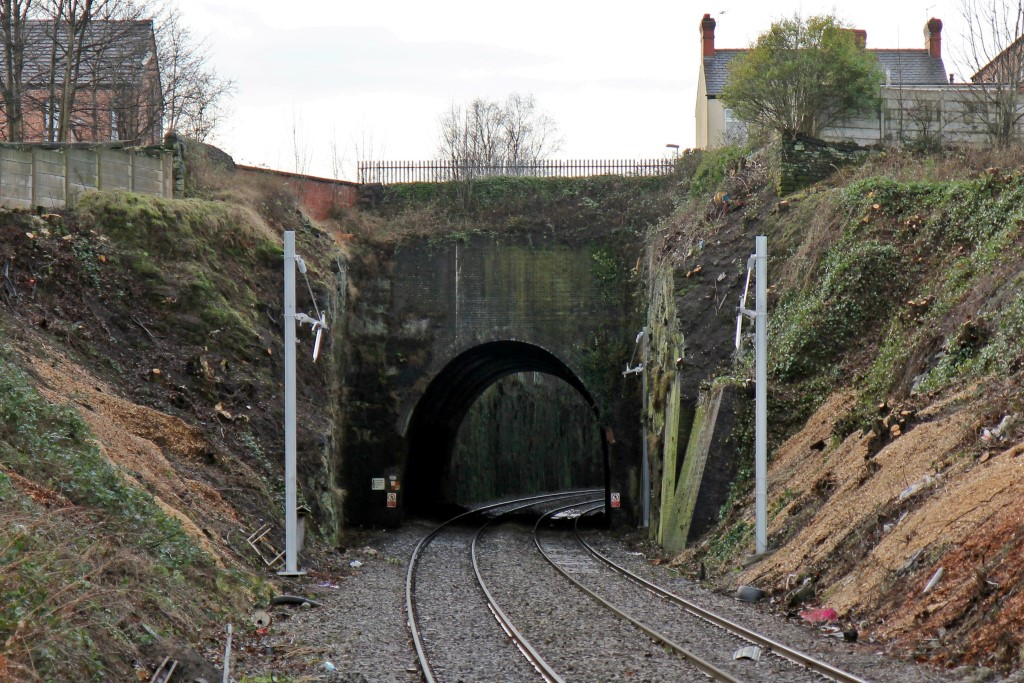
The Scholes Lane tunnel, at the western end of the station.

Preceding station	National Rail	Following station
Eccleston Park	Northern Trains; Liverpool to Wigan Line	St Helens Central
