= St Helens Central railway station =

Railway station in Merseyside, England

St Helens Central
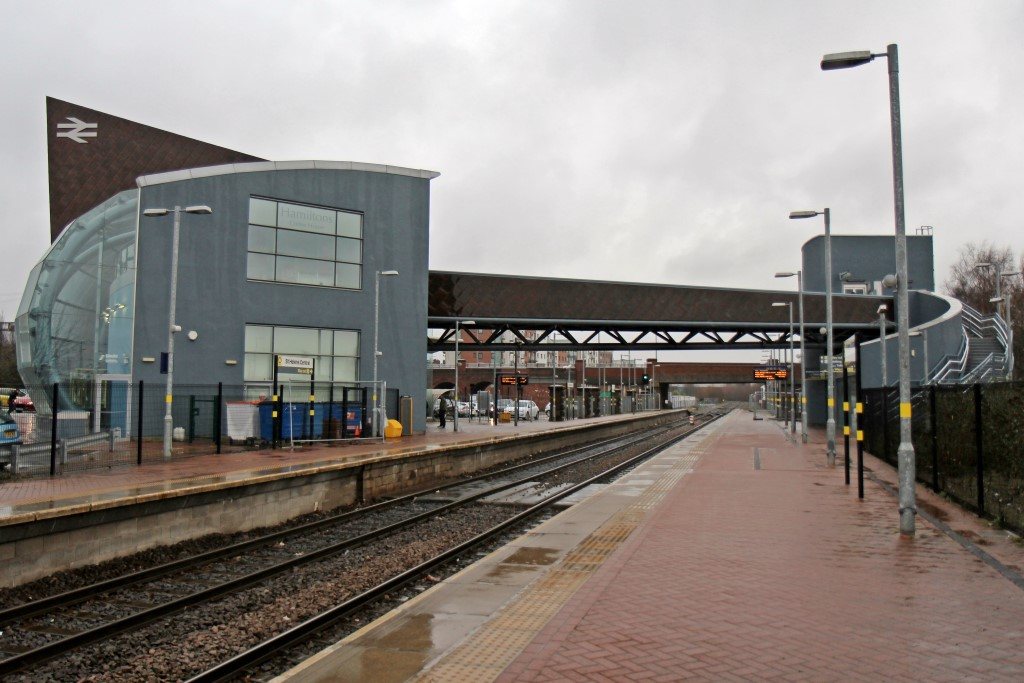
- The station in 2013 prior to electrification

General information
- Location: St Helens, St Helens; England
- Coordinates: 53.4529°N 2.730°W
- Grid reference: SJ516953
- Manager: Northern Trains
- Transit authority: Merseytravel
- Platforms: 2

Other information
- Station code: SNH
- Fare zone: A1/A2
- Classification: DfT category D

History
- Original company: St Helens Canal and Railway
- Pre-grouping: London and North Western Railway
- Post-grouping: London Midland and Scottish Railway

Key dates
- 1 February 1858: Opened as St Helens
- 1 March 1949: Renamed St Helens Shaw Street
- 11 May 1987: Renamed St Helens Central

Passengers
- 2020/21: ▼0.208 million
- 2021/22: ▲0.514 million
- 2022/23: ▲0.537 million
- 2023/24: ▲0.619 million
- 2024/25: ▲0.669 million
Location
Notes
- Passenger statistics from the Office of Rail and Road

St Helens Central railway station (previously known as St. Helens Shaw Street) is a railway station serving the town of St Helens, Merseyside, England. It is on the Liverpool to Wigan Line from Liverpool Lime Street to Wigan North Western. The station is managed by Northern Trains, and is served by TransPennine Express and Northern Trains.

The station is on the Merseytravel City Line. The City Line is the name given to local rail routes out of Liverpool Lime Street operated by companies other than Merseyrail. The City Line appears on Merseytravel network maps as red, and covers the Liverpool-Wigan Line.

== History ==
The station was originally opened by the St Helens Canal and Railway as St Helens on 1 February 1858 to replace two earlier (1833 and 1849) nearby stations. The original 1833 route from Widnes Dock through the town (along with the branch from St Helens Junction) and onwards to Rainford Junction (opened along with the station in 1858) was joined a decade later by the Lancashire Union Railway to Wigan North Western and Blackburn in December 1869, whilst the route southwestwards to Huyton was opened by the London and North Western Railway in 1871. It was renamed St Helens Shaw Street in 1949.

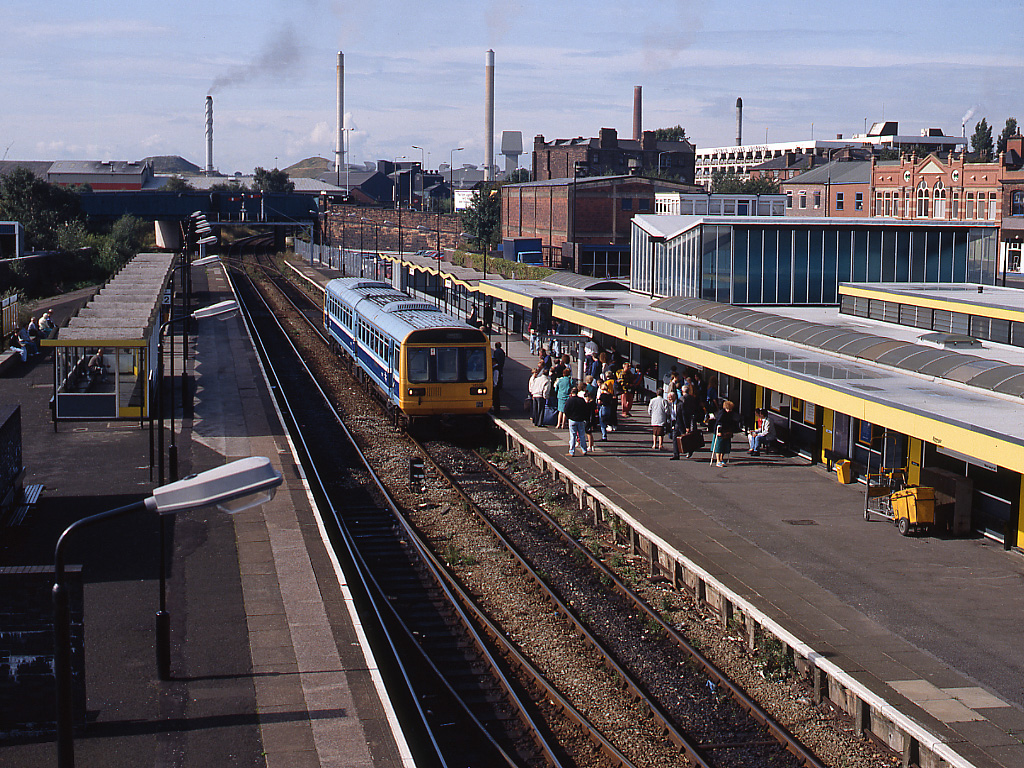
The station in 1992 largely as completed in 1961

The station was completely rebuilt in 1961 to a design by the architect William Robert Headley which included and advertised a significant amount of the local Pilkington Vitrolite Glass. The fully glazed ticket hall was illuminated by a tower with a valley roof on two Y-shaped supports. The platform canopies were free standing folded plate roofs on tubular columns.

By this time, the original St Helens and Runcorn Gap Railway routes had both closed to passenger traffic, services having ceased on 18 June 1951. The short branch to St Helens Junction suffered the same fate in June 1965 as a result of the Beeching Axe, though freight traffic would continue to operate on both lines until the 1980s.

It then became St Helens Central in 1987 (the original GCR St Helens Central station situated on Corporation Street having been completely closed in 1952 and demolished in the late 1960s). Two years later the through link to St Helens Junction was severed, though the section as far as the Hays Chemicals plant at Sutton Oak remained open until 2002 (the track remains in place but out of use to the present day). This left only the Liverpool to Wigan line in operation, along with a short section of the old Rainford line serving the Pilkington Glass factory at Cowley Hill (near Gerards Bridge) though this has also been disused for several years.

An accident occurred on 11 November 1988, when a train from Blackpool North to Liverpool Lime Street became derailed after it departed from St Helens Central at 23:15. Leaving the station, the driving cab struck a bridge abutment; the driver was killed and 16 passengers received minor injuries. The lifeguard, designed to keep small objects away from the wheels, had come loose and become deformed, causing the wheelset to straddle two tracks.

In 2005, Merseytravel and Network Rail invited tenders for the reconstruction of the station, including a new station building, footbridge and lifts. The new station building and facilities were assembled just a few yards from the 1960s station building and is the third build on the same site. The project came in at a total estimated cost of £6 million, with the European Union contributing £1.7 million towards the total funding. The new footbridge was lifted into place in the early hours of 22 January 2007. Construction work was completed in the summer, with the new waiting rooms and footbridge opened to passengers on 19 September. The new station building was officially opened on 3 December 2007.

=== Electrification ===
Overhead electrification of the Liverpool to Wigan line was completed in 2015. Earlier, modifications to the adjacent bridgeworks were undertaken in 2012 and during 2014 electrification masts and new signals were installed, overhead wiring taking place in early 2015. Northern Rail, the then train operating company, announced the introduction of electric services on the line from the commencement of the new timetable changeover in 2015.

== Station information ==
There is a booking office, and a ticket vending machine is provided next to it. Disabled access is facilitated by lifts on both platforms.

Car parking (including disabled bays) is available and is free for rail users, provided a parking ticket for the vehicle is obtained from the ticket office first. Recharging facilities have recently been provided for electrically powered vehicles.

Cold drink and snack vending machines are provided in the waiting room on the Wigan-bound platform. In March 2012, a dedicated coffee shop serving hot and cold food was opened upstairs in the main station building but closed in September 2012, the franchise remaining vacant up to the present.

As of 2017, St Helens Central operates automatic ticket barriers, replacing a temporary staffed barrier operated by Northern (Arriva Rail North).

== Services ==
During Monday to Saturday daytimes, there is a half-hourly local stopping service between Liverpool Lime Street and Wigan North Western, and an hourly fast service between Lime Street and Blackpool North via Preston. Until the May 2018 timetable update, this service started and terminated at Liverpool South Parkway. Four TransPennine Express trains call per day from Liverpool Lime Street to Preston and three continue to and from Glasgow Central each way.

On Sundays, there is an hourly service to Wigan/Blackpool and Liverpool, calling at all stations bar Edge Hill.

The typical off-peak service is (Monday-Friday):

=== Northern ===
- 3 trains per hour to Liverpool Lime Street
- 3 trains per hour to Wigan North Western, one of which continues to Blackpool North railway station via Preston railway station

=== TransPennine Express ===
- 4 trains per day to Liverpool Lime Street
- 3 trains per day to Glasgow Central

Preceding station	National Rail	Following station
Huyton	Northern Trains; Liverpool to Wigan Line	Wigan North Western
Thatto Heath	Northern Trains; Liverpool to Wigan Line	Garswood
Liverpool Lime Street	TransPennine Express; TransPennine North West	Wigan North Western
	Historical railways	
Terminus	London and North Western Railway; Lancashire Union Railway	Carr Mill
	Disused railways	
Gerards Bridge	London & North Western Railway; St Helens and Runcorn Gap Railway	Peasley Cross

== See also ==
- St Helens Junction railway station
