= Wavertree Technology Park railway station =

Railway station in Merseyside, England

Wavertree Technology Park
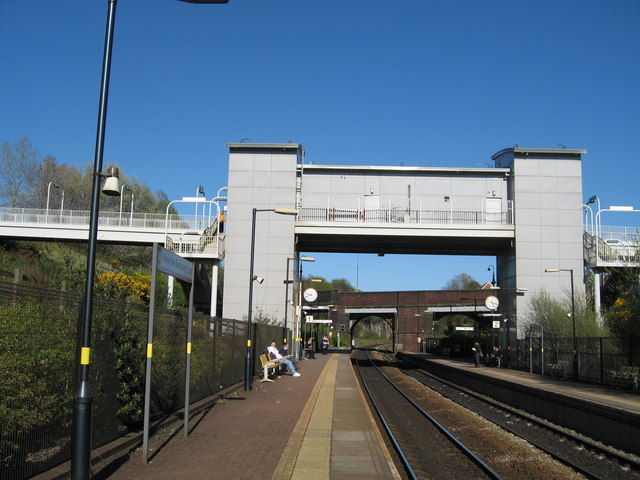
- The station in 2007

General information
- Location: Wavertree, Liverpool, England
- Coordinates: 53.4052°N 2.9229°W
- Grid reference: SJ387902
- Manager: Northern Trains
- Transit authority: Merseytravel
- Platforms: 2

Other information
- Station code: WAV
- Fare zone: C1
- Classification: DfT category F1

Key dates
- 13 August 2000: Opened

Passengers
- 2021/22: ▲0.221 million
- 2022/23: ▲0.240 million
- 2023/24: ▲0.249 million
- 2024/25: ▲0.293 million
- 2025/26: ▲0.330 million
Location
Notes
- Passenger statistics from the Office of Rail and Road

Wavertree Technology Park railway station serves the Wavertree suburb of Liverpool, in Merseyside, England. It lies at the western end of Olive Mount cutting, on the original Liverpool-Manchester line. Services are operated by Northern Trains.

== History ==
The station opened on 13 August 2000, at a cost of £2 million.

Since 5 March 2015, the route through the station was energised using overhead lines, allowing electric traction to operate services. This was part of the electrification of George Stephenson's original Liverpool and Manchester Railway and the branch line to Wigan.

== Facilities ==
The station has a ticket office, located on the bridge above the platforms; it is staffed throughout the hours of service, seven days per week (05:15-midnight on Mondays to Saturdays; 08:00-23:45 on Sunday). Waiting shelters are provided at platform level on each side, with digital display screens, customer help points and an automated public address system to provide train running information. Both platforms have lifts from the footbridge, which has ramped access from the main entrance and car park, so are fully accessible for mobility-impaired users.

== Services ==
Northern Trains operates the following off-peak service pattern in trains per hour (tph):

- 3 tph to Liverpool Lime Street
- 2 tph to Wigan North Western
- 1 tph to Manchester Airport, via Manchester Piccadilly.

| Preceding station | National Rail | Following station |
|---|---|---|
| Edge Hill | Northern Trains Liverpool Lime Street to Manchester Airport via Chat Moss | Broad Green |
| Liverpool Lime Street | Northern Trains Liverpool Lime Street to Manchester Airport via Chat Moss | Broad Green |
| Edge Hill | Northern Trains Liverpool–Wigan line | Broad Green |
| Liverpool Lime Street | Northern Trains Liverpool–Wigan line | Broad Green |

== Gallery ==
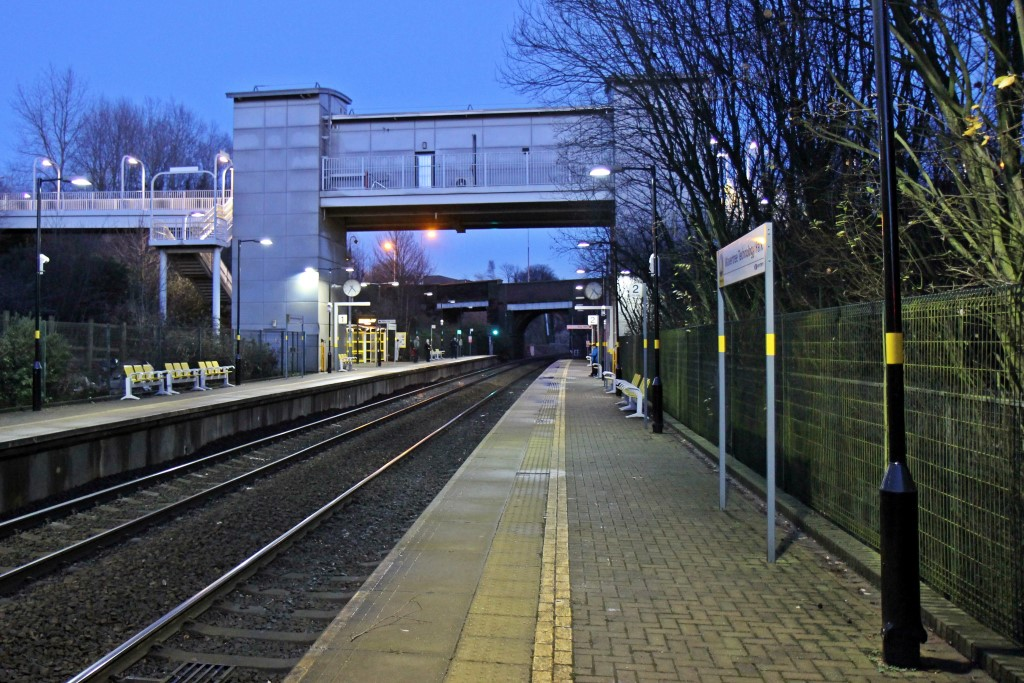
The station during the evening.

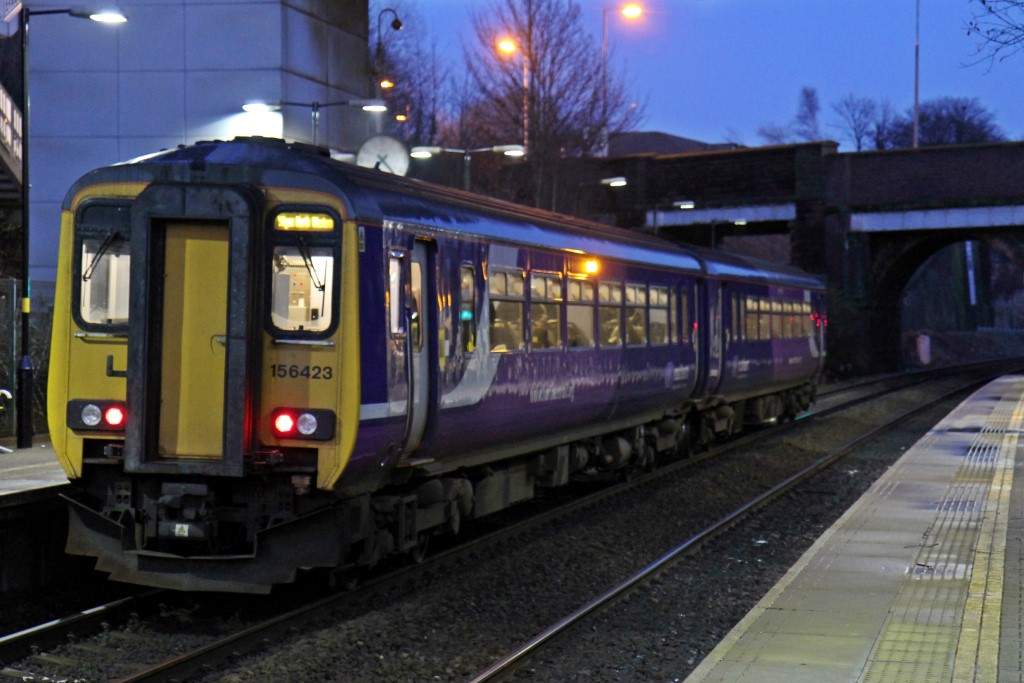
A Northern Rail Class 156 waits at the station.

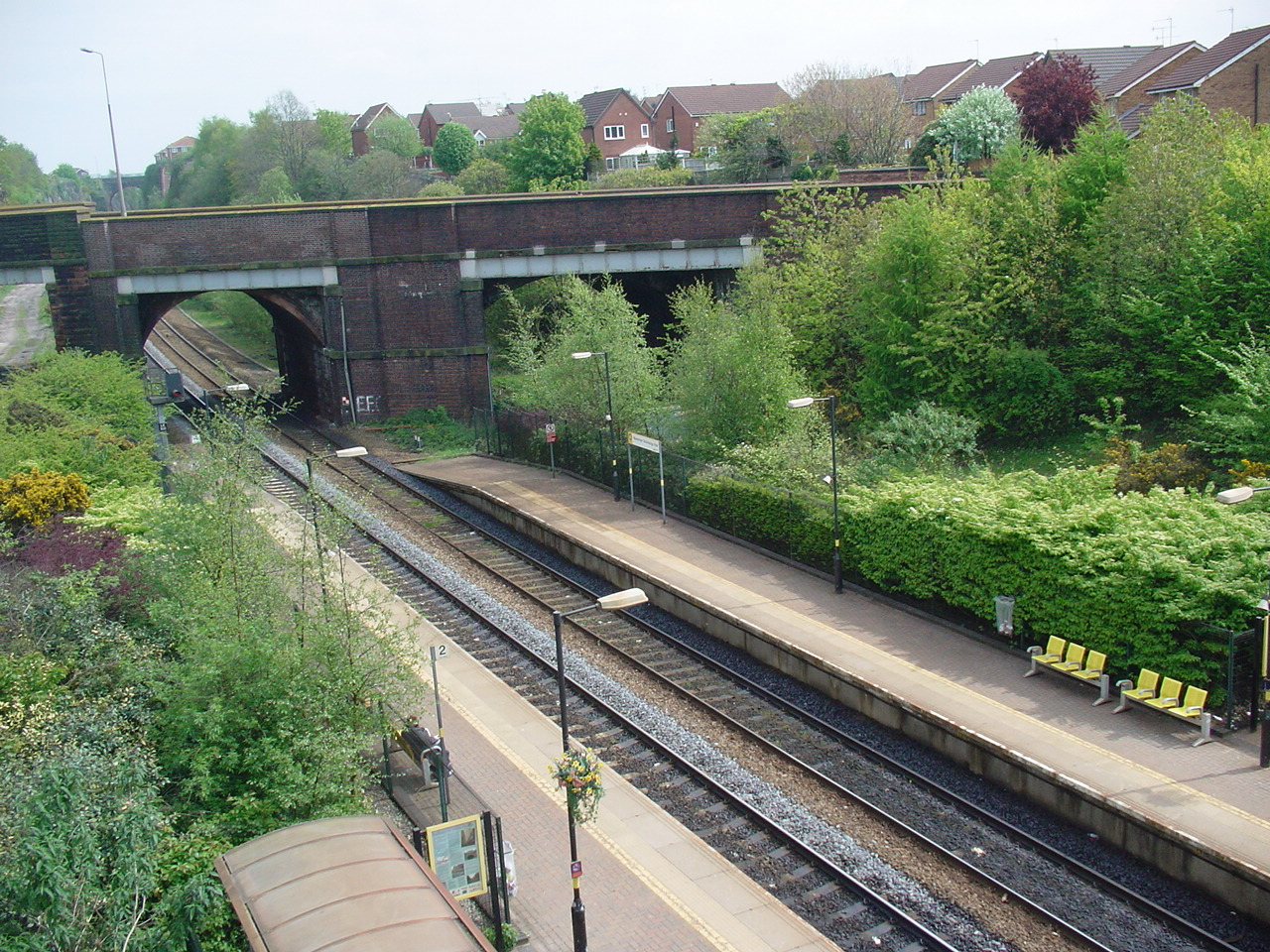
The view towards the Olive Mount cutting.

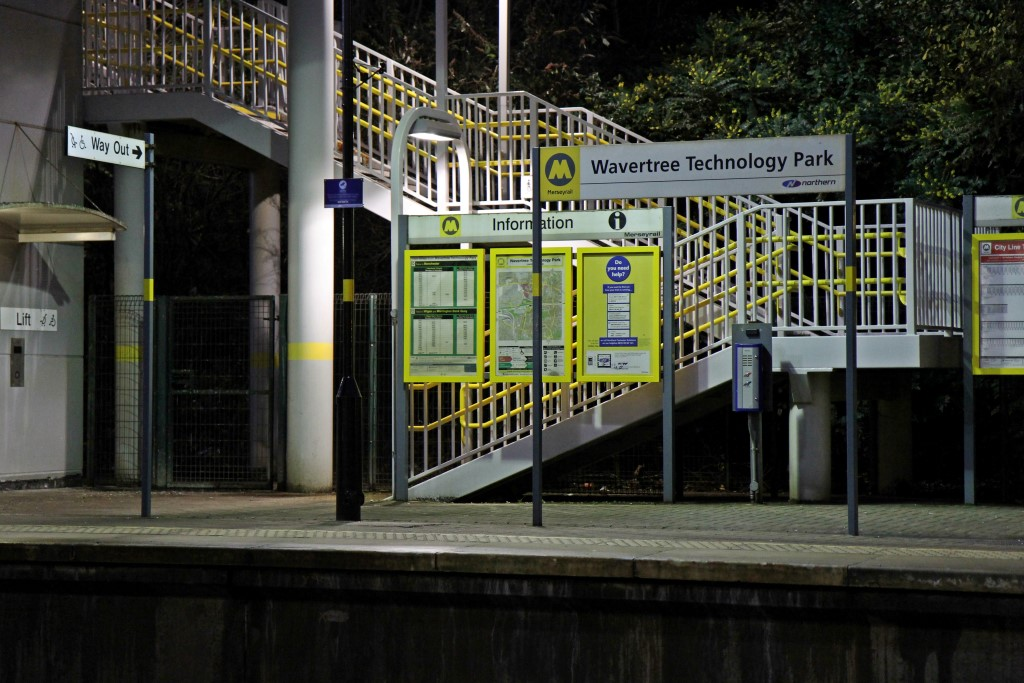
Platform information and signage.
