= St Helens Junction railway station =

Railway station in Merseyside, England

Coordinates: 53.434°N 2.700°W

St Helens Junction
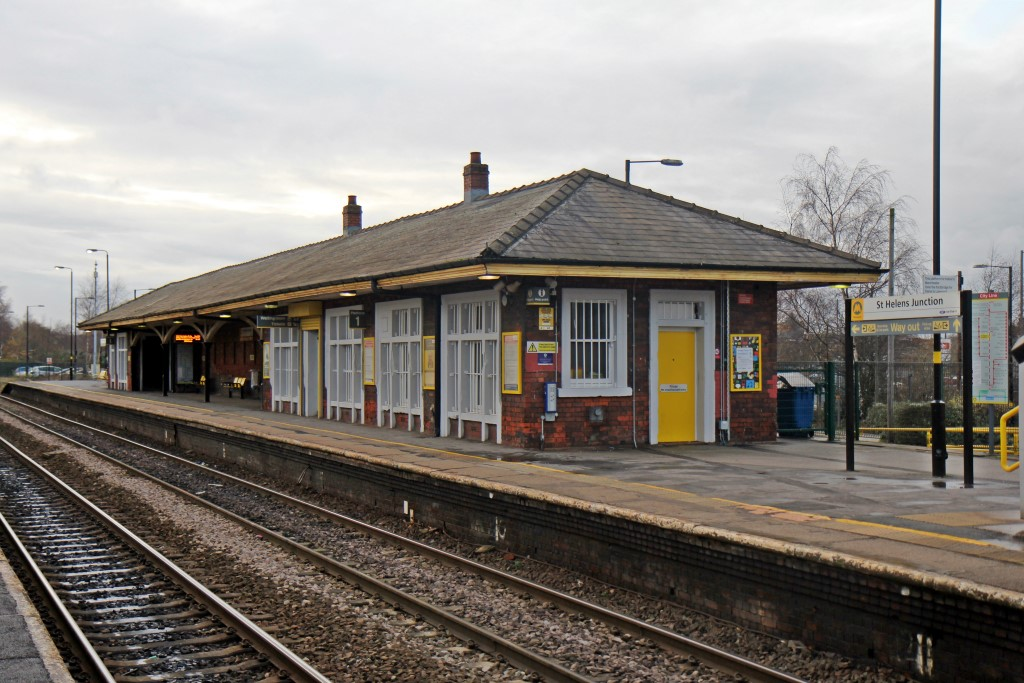
- The station in 2014 prior to electrification

General information
- Location: Sutton, Merseyside, St Helens; England
- Grid reference: SJ535932
- Manager: Northern Trains
- Transit authority: Merseytravel
- Platforms: 2

Other information
- Station code: SHJ
- Fare zone: A1
- Classification: DfT category E

Key dates
- 15 September 1830: Opened

Passengers
- 2020/21: ▼43,018
- 2021/22: ▲0.124 million
- 2022/23: ▲0.163 million
- 2023/24: ▲0.194 million
- 2024/25: ▲0.206 million
Location
Notes
- Passenger statistics from the Office of Rail and Road

St Helens Junction railway station is a railway station serving the town of St Helens, Merseyside, England. It is in Sutton, three miles southeast of St Helens town centre. The station is on the electrified northern route of the Liverpool to Manchester Line, 12 miles (19 km) east of Liverpool Lime Street (on the former Liverpool and Manchester Railway). The station and all trains calling there are presently operated by Northern Trains.

== History ==
St Helens Junction station was opened in 1830 as part of the Liverpool and Manchester Railway, and is one of the oldest passenger railway stations in the world. These early intermediate stations were often little more than halts, usually positioned where the railway was crossed by a road or turnpike. This probably accounts for variations in the names of these stopping places, St Helens Junction station was probably originally known as Bottom of Sutton Incline becoming St Helens Junction sometime in 1832 or 1833. A local historian puts the opening date later. The OS 6 inch map surveyed in 1846-47 has the station named as St. Helens station.

The station was situated to the south of Sutton just after the Manchester-facing connecting line from the St Helens and Runcorn Gap Railway, hence it being called Junction. The main line of the St Helens and Runcorn Gap Railway crossed the Liverpool and Manchester Railway on an overbridge shortly before the junction and station. That route, which ran originally from the town of St Helens to the area which would later develop into the town of Widnes, opened on 21 February 1833 making this station the focal point of one of the first inter-company junctions.

The station originally had four platforms - two through lines and two bay platforms on the northern and southern sides of the main building which mostly dealt with local services (this is now part of the station roadway approach and car park arrangements). Trains from Liverpool Lime Street would also terminate at St Helens Junction until the mid 1950s, whilst the shuttle service to/from St Helens Shaw Street was withdrawn in June 1965. Several walkway bridges have been constructed and demolished since the station opened in 1833. The Georgian buildings on the south facing platforms were demolished in the early 1960s and a small open waiting shelter built in their place.

To the west of the station on the south side of the line stood the London and North Western Railway tarpaulin factory, known locally as 'the sheeting sheds', access from Monastery Lane being provided by a footbridge known as 'the pudding bag bridge', a favourite location of trainspotters in the 1950s as the steam engines of westbound trains were being fired to climb the Sutton bank with its 2.5 km of 1 in 90 gradient. The station building was listed as a Grade II listed building on 14 October 2016. The reasons given were: its historic interest, representing a second generation of station buildings; its Classical design; its degree of survival, being relatively unaltered; and its group value with other listed buildings on the line.

The lines through the station were due to be electrified by December 2014 but the work was finally completed in early March 2015, 3 months behind schedule.

In 2013, concern was expressed that parking space at the station was inadequate. In August 2017, Merseytravel announced that a new car park would be built at the station, increasing the number of parking spaces from 66 to 240. The £792,000 package of works would also see improvements to the CCTV coverage and lighting and the creation of additional blue-badge parking spaces. The extension was completed and opened on 14 May 2018.

== Facilities ==
The station is staffed throughout the day (including Sundays), with the ticket office (on the eastbound-platform) open from 15 minutes before start of service until 23:50 each evening. There are shelters on each platform, along with customer help points, timetable poster boards and digital display screens to provide train running information. Step-free access is available to both platforms, though that for the westbound one requires staff assistance (as it is via a steep ramp and locked gate). The two platforms are also linked by footbridge. There is car parking for 240 vehicles.

== Services ==
On Monday to Saturday daytimes, there is an hourly service to Liverpool Lime Street, and an hourly service to Manchester Airport. There are additional peak time trains to Manchester Vic, Wigan North Western, and an early morning service to Ellesmere Port via Warrington Bank Quay Prior to the 2020 COVID pandemic, the service frequency was half hourly to Liverpool and there was a regular service to Warrington Bank Quay, but these additional services have not been reinstated.

Electrification has seen the introduction of three car class 323s and 331s. The services to Wigan and Manchester Victoria were usually formed of class 319s, however following their withdrawal, the services are now formed of 331s. The service to Ellesmere Port was run by either a class 150 or class 156.

On Sundays, the service to Manchester Airport is extended to Wilmslow.

Whilst fast services did call at the station for many years, they no longer call here and have been relocated to nearby Lea Green, which sees frequent services from TransPennine Express with services to Liverpool and Hull, via Manchester Victoria.

Preceding station	National Rail	Following station
Lea Green	Northern Trains; Liverpool to Manchester Line	Earlestown

== See also ==
- Listed buildings in St Helens, Merseyside
- St Helens Central railway station
