= Liverpool–Wigan line =

Railway line in the north-west of England

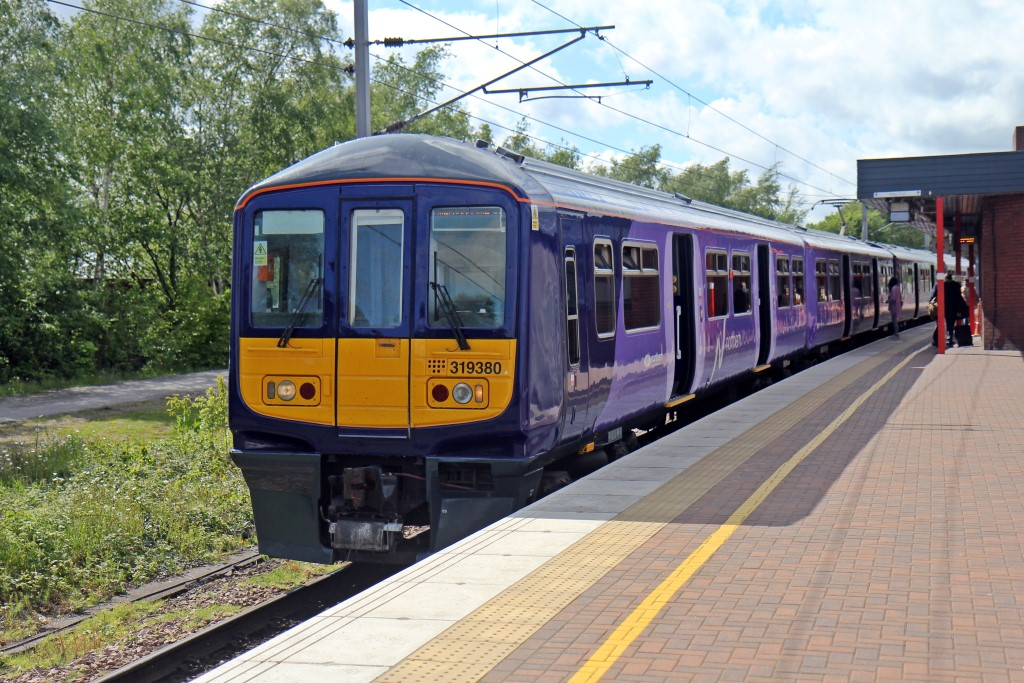
- A Northern Rail Class 319 at Wigan North Western

Overview
- Status: Operational
- Owner: Network Rail
- Locale: Merseyside; Greater Manchester
- Termini: Liverpool Lime Street; Wigan North Western

Service
- System: National Rail

Technical
- Track gauge: 1,435 mm (4 ft 8 1/2 in) standard gauge
- Electrification: 25 kV 50 Hz AC OHLE
Route map
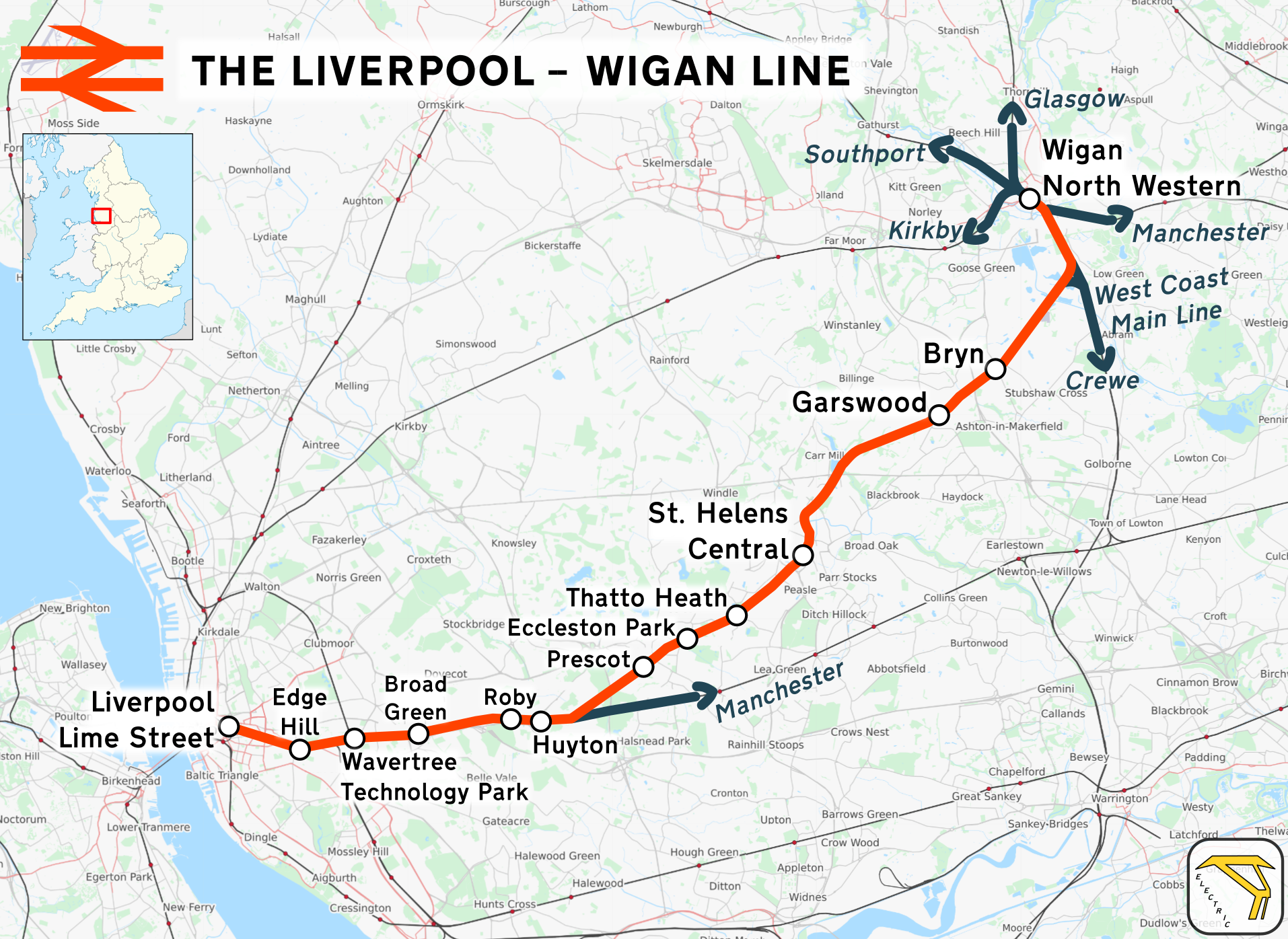
(Click to expand)

The Liverpool–Wigan line is a railway line in the north-west of England, running between Liverpool Lime Street and Wigan North Western via St Helens Central station. The line is a part of the electrified Merseyrail Liverpool to Wigan City Line. The stations, and all trains serving it, are operated by Northern Trains, however the stations are branded Merseyrail using Merseyrail ticketing.

== Description ==
The route from Liverpool, running east follows part of the northern section of the Liverpool–Manchester line up to Huyton Junction; where it branches north-eastwards, routing via Prescot and St Helens Central, then to Ince Moss Junction. Here, the line joins the West Coast Main Line near Springs Branch and runs on to Wigan North Western.

The route sees service from three passenger trains per hour in both directions between Liverpool and Wigan. Following the 17 May 2015 timetable changeover, it is now usually operated by Northern Trains 4-Car Class 319 electric units. The frequency of three per hour comprises two local stopping services and one longer distance express.

The longer distance service runs from Liverpool Lime Street on to Blackpool North operating a limited stop service of Huyton, St Helens Central and Wigan in the Liverpool to Wigan leg of its journey. As of May 2018, Preston to Blackpool North electrification was completed and the service from Liverpool to Blackpool North is now also operated by Northern Trains 4-Car Class 319 & 3-car Class 331 electric units.

For local passenger transport, these routes are branded as a significant sections of Merseytravel's City Line routes.

== History ==
The history of the first section of the route from Liverpool Lime Street is the same as that of the original Stephenson Liverpool to Manchester first passenger-carrying railway as far as Huyton, where the route then diverges from the Liverpool to Manchester line at Huyton junction.

The section of line from Huyton to St Helens was opened on 1 November 1871 by the London and North Western Railway, the line from St Helens to Wigan having been opened two years earlier on 1 December 1869 by the Lancashire Union Railway. The line is double-tracked from its junction with the Liverpool - Manchester line at Huyton to its junction with the West Coast Main Line at Ince Moss, although originally the section from Carr Mill to Ince Moss was four-tracked to accommodate the freight traffic from the numerous collieries on this section. In later years following colliery closures, the two freight tracks were lifted. This can still be evidenced from the width of the bridges on this part of the line ( indeed the size of Carr Mill Viaduct was physically halved although the almost adjacent bridge over the A580 East Lancashire Road remains intact with four track width).

In latter years, the section from St. Helens towards Rainford (originally part of the St. Helens & Runcorn Gap Railway) via Gerards Bridge Junction, terminated at the NSG Pilkington Cowley Hill works as its fuel oil storage depot - such traffic being only for that purpose. However, in Spring 2014, the company decided to re-configure redundant areas of the works site as an Industrial Park, offering rail access. There is a similar oil depot spur - Ravenhead Sidings - to the south of St. Helens Central station serving the NSG Pilkington Watson Street site with fuel. Over a number of years, usage of these facilities has become redundant, due to competition from piped natural gas and road tanker oil deliveries, however of 2016 Ravenhead sidings have seen use by trains delivering sand, one of the ingredients required for glass-making.

The line south from St. Helens Central (formerly St. Helens Shaw Street) to St. Helens Junction on the northern Liverpool–Manchester line has also been discontinued. The trackbed is intact as far as the former Hays Chemical works at Sutton Oak and Network Rail regard the St. Helens Central - to St. Helens Junction line as protected. There has been a number of proposed projects by local authorities and other political bodies in the North-West to reinstate the St. Helens Central to St. Helens Junction line. The line would have three purposes: to service local passenger stations along the line, give a more direct route into St. Helens from Manchester and provide a diversionary route in case of disruptions on either the Liverpool–Wigan or Liverpool–Manchester lines. In addition a new station was proposed with a park-and-ride service at Carr Mill, between St. Helens Central and Garswood stations. These elements have been included in or presented to several Route Utilisation Strategies (RUS) for the area.

== Services ==
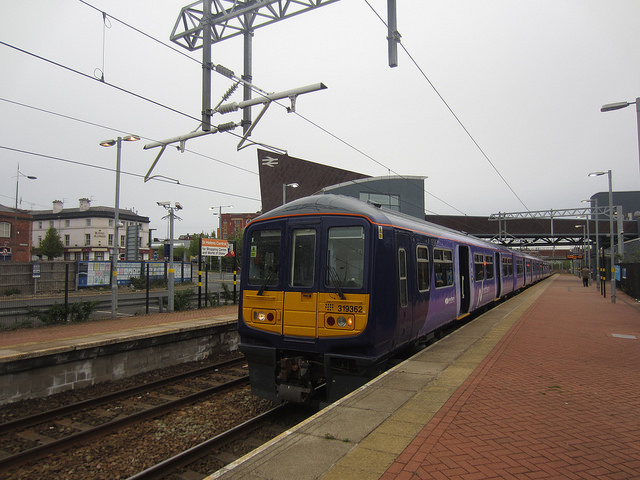
Northern Rail 319362 'Northern Powerhouse' at St. Helens Central, May 2015

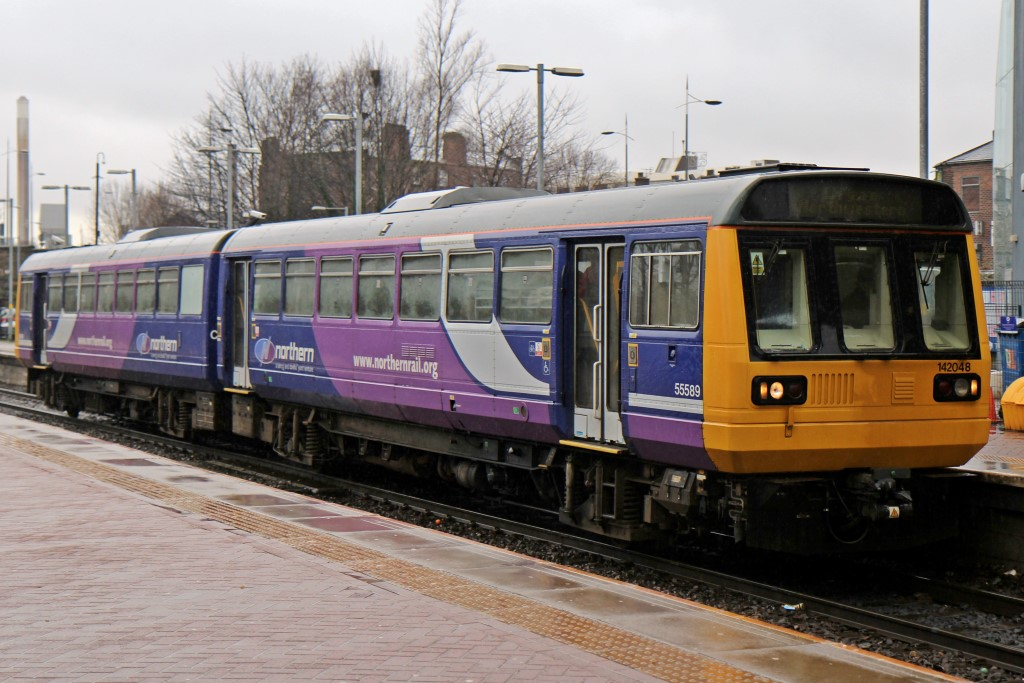
A Northern Rail Class 142 at St Helens Central, in December 2013

Services on this route are currently operated by Northern Trains & TransPennine Trains Ltd. From the new timetable changeover on 17 May 2015, an electric service was introduced on the Liverpool to Wigan service operated by Northern Rail using 4-Car Class 319 units. As of May 2018, the Preston to Blackpool North electrification was completed and the service from Liverpool to Blackpool North was now also operated by Northern 4-Car Class 319 electric units. In December 2019, TransPennine Express launched services between Liverpool Lime Street & Glasgow Central which use this route calling at Liverpool Lime Street, St Helens Central, Wigan North Western, Preston & Continue along the West Coast Mainline These services are operated by class 397 5 car civity units, In January 2024, Northern Trains' Class 319 units were all retired and replaced with 3/4 car Class 331 units

=== Monday to Saturday ===
Daytime hours of operation

Northern Trains: typically see 3 trains per hour each way between Liverpool and Wigan. The typical service pattern comprises:

- Two all-stations stopping services, operating every 30 minutes between Liverpool and Wigan only, and
- One hourly long-distance express service, originating at Liverpool Lime St and continuing to Blackpool North via Preston.

The limited-stop Northern service calls only at Liverpool Lime Street, Huyton, St Helens Central and Wigan in the Liverpool to Wigan leg of its journey. The service then calls at Euxton Balshaw Lane, Leyland and Preston on the West Coast Main Line.

Morning and evening peaks see an increase in Northern service frequency, including some services originating or terminating at St Helens Central and some semi-fast services.

TransPennine Express: 2x Trains per Day to Glasgow central, 1x train from Glasgow, 1x train From Oxenholme Lake District

First service departs Liverpool for Wigan at around 0530. The first train from St Helens leaves for Liverpool just before 06:00, and Wigan's first departure for Liverpool is a little after 06:00, dependent on Winter or Summer timetable. Last departures from Wigan and Liverpool vary depending on the day of the week and therefore a consultation of the current timetable is recommended prior to travel.

=== Sunday ===
Northern Trains: An hourly stopping service operates on the route in both directions between Liverpool and Blackpool North via Preston calling at open stations en route. From 10 December 2017 both Bryn and Eccleston Park were also added.

TransPennine Express: 2x Trains per Day to Glasgow central, 1x train from Glasgow, 1x train From Oxenholme Lake District

== Technical details ==
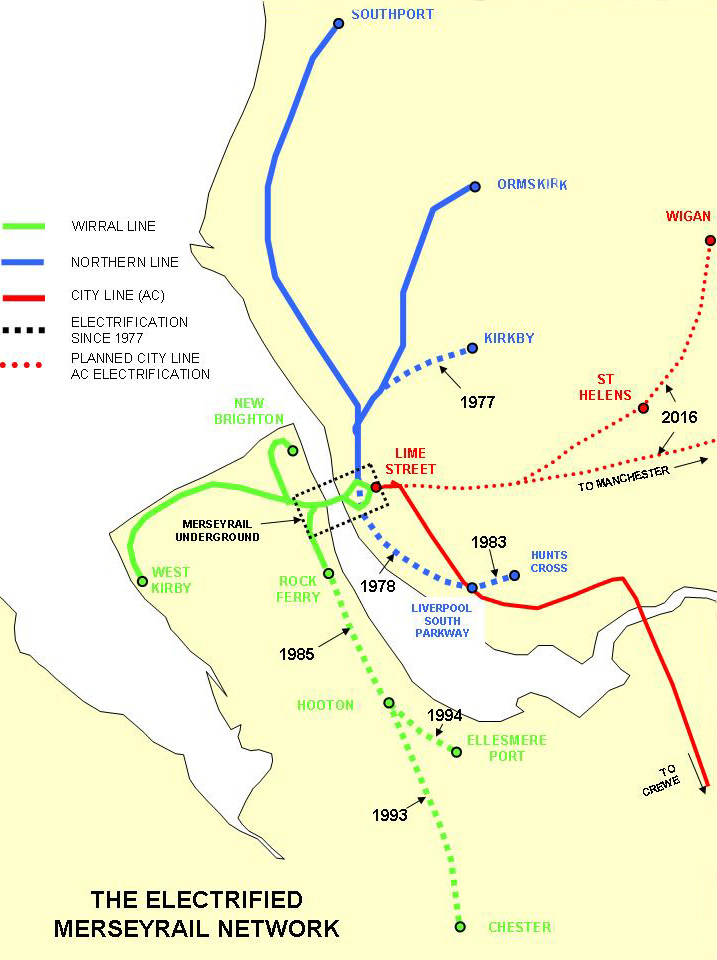

=== Route ===
- Liverpool Lime Street, Western terminus, here it is possible to interchange onto services to the Wirral. On leaving Lime Street, the trains pass through the Lime Street tunnels.
- Edge Hill, for inner city districts of Edge Hill, Kensington and Toxteth.
- Edge Hill Junction, where services southwards and to Manchester via Warrington Central split off
- Wavertree Technology Park, for Wavertree. Also, the express service to Manchester Airport
- Broad Green, suburban station (for Broadgreen Hospital)
- Roby Junction, located between Broad Green and Roby stations, is where the new additional track up to Huyton Junction, commences.
- Roby, suburban station
- Huyton for Huyton shopping centre and bus station. Also, change here for services to Warrington Bank Quay and Manchester Airport
- Huyton Junction, where services towards Manchester Airport and Warrington BQ split off
- Prescot, suburban station serving Prescot town and shopping centre
- Eccleston Park, suburban station
- Thatto Heath, suburban station
- St Helens Central, for St Helens town centre, the World of Glass and the North-West Museum of Road Transport
- Garswood, suburban station (for Ashton-in-Makerfield), also the last stop within Merseytravel's ticket zone
- Bryn, suburban station (for Ashton-in-Makerfield)
- Ince Moss Junction where the Liverpool–Wigan line joins the West Coast Main Line
- Wigan North Western, Eastern Terminus, Change here for Intercity trains to Preston and points north, Warrington Bank Quay and points south.

=== Track distances ===
Network Rail's route NW 2023 runs for 20.7 kilometres (12.9 mi) from Springs Branch Junction, Ince-in-Makerfield, to Huyton Junction, Huyton.

NW 2023	M-Ch	km
Springs Branch Junction	0-00	0.00
Ince Moss Junction	0-44	0.90
Bryn	2-32	3.85
Garswood	3-56	5.95
St Helens	7-30	11.85
St Helens Station Junction	7-42	12.10
Thatto Heath	9-11	14.70
Eccleston Park	10-07	16.25
Prescot	10-77	17.65
Huyton Junction	12-69	20.70

=== Signalling ===
The route is now fully colour-light signalled all the way from Huyton to Wigan, though a manual signal box remains at St Helens Central, that at Huyton having been abolished and demolished in July 2014. The St Helens 'box' takes responsibility for the middle section of the line, with the northern end controlled by Warrington PSB since the WCML was resignalled in 1973. All other manual boxes en route have been abolished, along with the last few semaphore signals (those at Prescot survived until September 2012, along with the box there). As well as the electrification of the line, control will eventually pass to the new North-West Regional Operating Centre in Manchester, as various areas are transferred over, any remaining signal boxes will then be decommissioned. The first of these to do so was the Huyton area in 2014.

=== Additional track ===
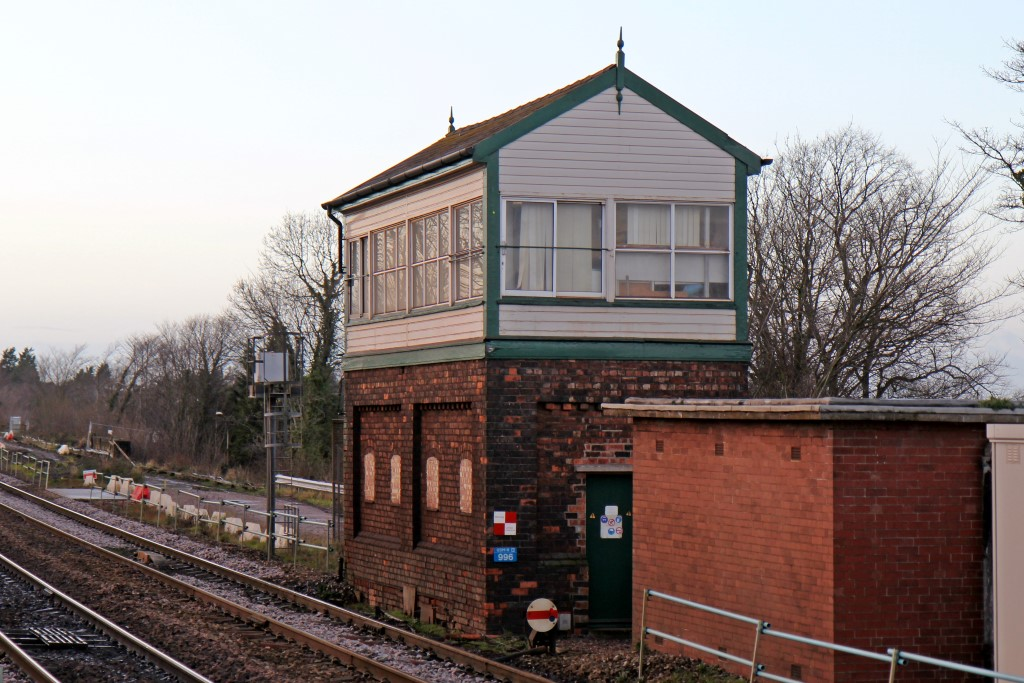
The track engineering works are visible behind the (now abolished) signal box at Huyton, in December 2013.

Work is complete to re-instate the four track layout which was originally in place between Huyton and Roby stations until the 1970s. This is part of the Electrification/Northern Hub improvement. It provides passing tracks to allow for slow and fast traffic plus a remodelling of the Huyton Junction turnout towards Prescot in order to avoid substantial interaction with the Liverpool–Manchester line, which was previously the case. Accompanying platform construction and associated works were undertaken at both stations. Completion of the scheme was scheduled for 2014, but had to be split into two stages - Three-Tracking was opened on 14 July 2014, as it lies entirely within the existing boundaries of railway land. The fourth track required requisition of a strip of land 260 yards (240 m) long from the BT Telephone Exchange site together with part of Huyton Bus Station. Provision of the fourth track became operational on 9 October 2017.

=== Electrification ===
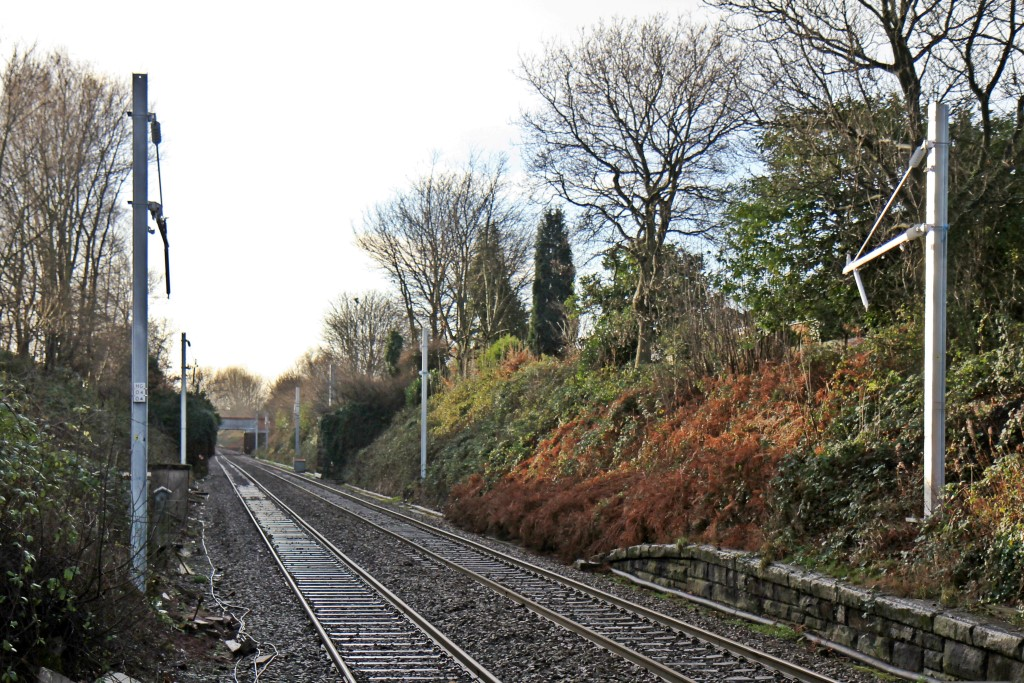
Partially erected catenary at Eccleston Park, in December 2013

Electrification was originally scheduled to be accomplished by December 2014, but due to delays the target was missed, however the line was eventually energised in March 2015.

Work on the 25 kV overhead line electrification is now complete as is similar work on the Liverpool - Manchester (Chat Moss) route. On Monday 16 March 2015 the Network Rail test coach and its associated train made a series of passes over the line. This was followed by a series of test runs during the night of 19/20 March 2015 using a Class 319 EMU. The test findings were submitted to ORR who subsequently 'signed off' the route for public service.

A single, Saturdays only, early morning out and back run in public service was due to start on 18 April 2015 but the booked electric was replaced by a diesel at the last minute because of electrical problems on the branch. The first public EMU service was the 06:00 Liverpool Lime Street to Wigan North Western and 07:03 return on 25 March 2015; this has run regularly since. Electric trains started all day passenger operation following the new timetable change on 17 May.

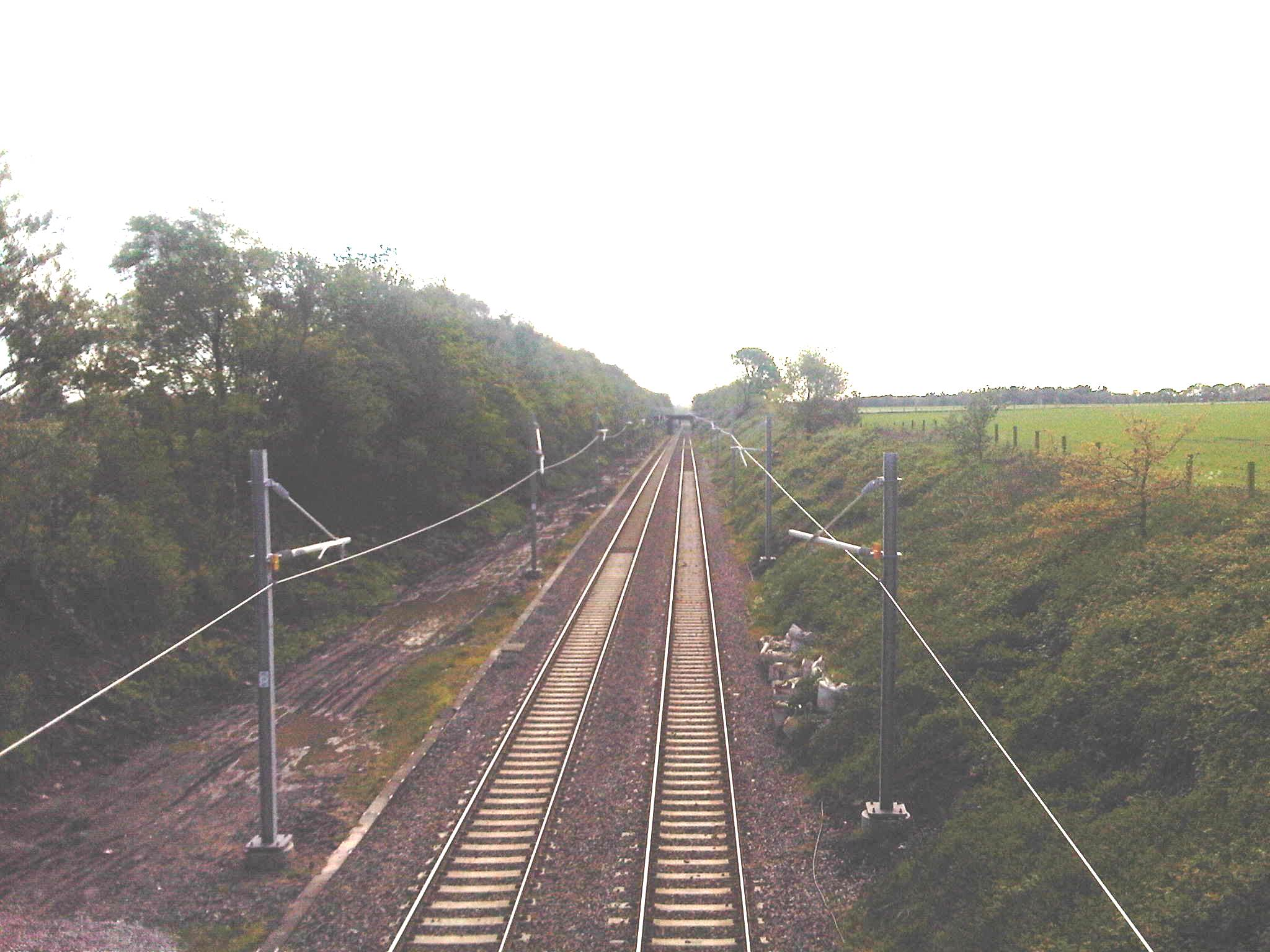
Electrification return wires west of Garswood station towards St. Helens Central, May 2014

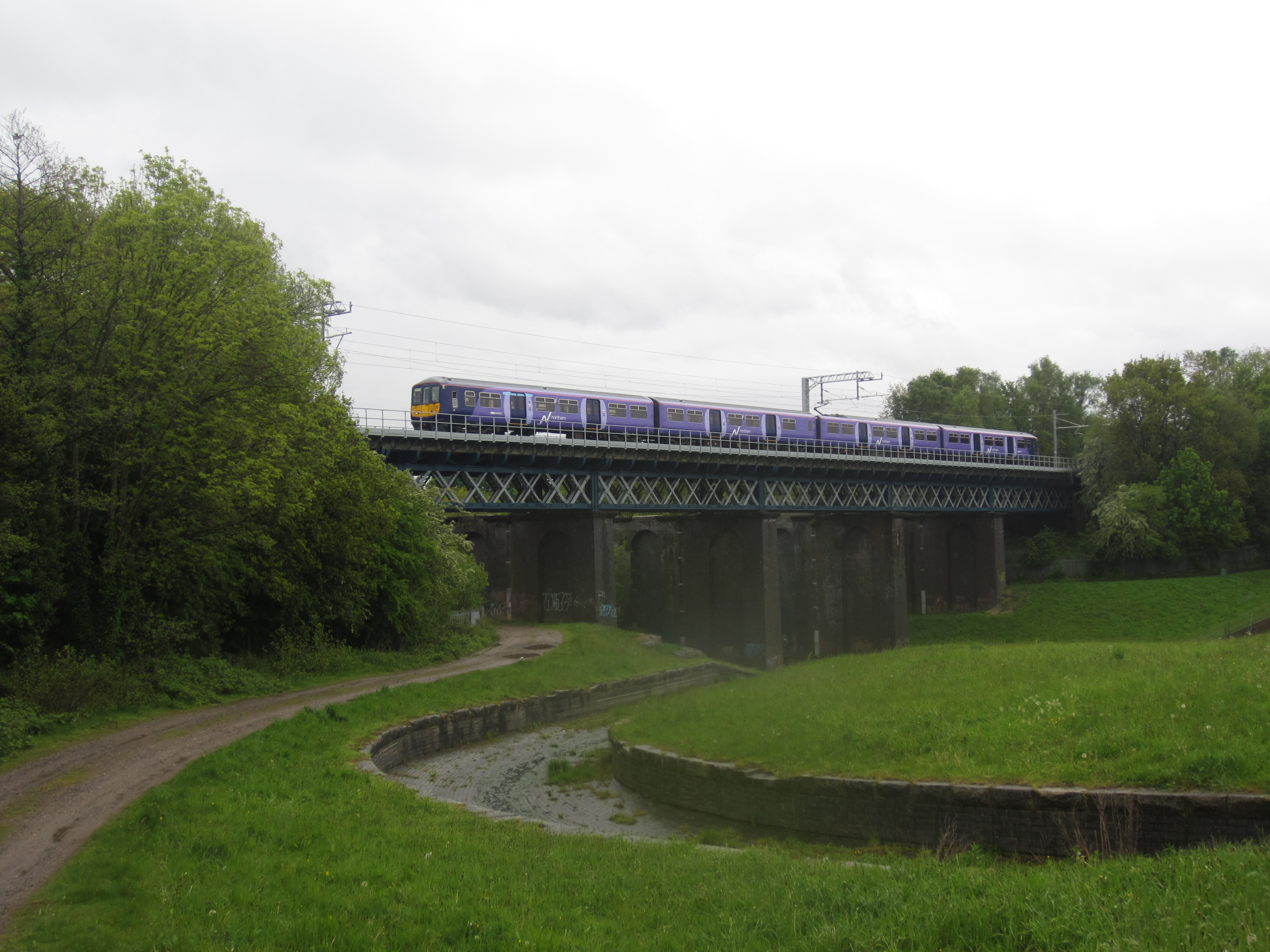
Northern Rail Class 319 EMU crosses Carr Mill Viaduct near St Helens on the first day of electric service on the Liverpool to Wigan route. May 2015

In December 2009, the then Transport Secretary Lord Adonis, had announced that the line between Huyton and St Helens Line Junctions would also be electrified along with the previously committed Edge Hill to Huyton Junction infill on the Liverpool–Manchester line, as part of a £200 million rail electrification scheme. This work, in conjunction with the previously announced Liverpool–Manchester line electrification would electrify the entire Liverpool to Wigan route. Additionally, considering currently-operated services; in conjunction with other infill electrification projects announced, this would allow electric trains to operate from Liverpool to St Helens, Wigan, Preston and Blackpool. Merseytravel (One of the two PTEs on the route) had previously stated their aspirations for the St Helens infill electrification; considering it a necessary addition to the (then-proposed) Liverpool–Manchester electrification, given the interworking of passenger services between the Chat Moss (Liverpool–Manchester) and St Helens (Liverpool–Wigan) lines imposed by the December 2008 timetable.

=== Proposed overground–underground integration ===
It had not been clarified if the newly electrified line would be incorporated within Merseyrail, as was the 1973 plan. The Liverpool–Wigan line was initially scheduled to be on the Merseyrail electric urban network. The Strategic Plan for the North West, the SPNW, in 1973 envisaged that the Outer Loop which was to be an orbital line circling the city of Liverpool, the Edge Hill Spur which is a tunnel connecting the east of Liverpool to the city centre underground sections, and the lines to St. Helens, Wigan and Warrington would be electrified and all integrated into Merseyrail by 1991. This meant that trains from Wigan theoretically could directly access West Kirby on the Wirral via Liverpool city centre's underground stations creating an east–west crossrail using the 1890 Liverpool Central to Liverpool James Street tunnel, which is currently used as a shunting tunnel. This never transpired, even though tunnelling work had commenced on the Edge Hill Spur section. Wigan was not incorporated into the Merseyrail electric network, with the Wigan line remaining a diesel service and operated as part of the Merseytravel diesel-operated City Line, although branded as Merseyrail. However, the current Network Rail electrification project would give fast electric train access from Wigan to Liverpool's high-level Lime Street railway station. If the mothballed Edge Hill Spur project were to be completed, it was thought trains from Wigan could access the stations in Liverpool city centre's underground section. However a major concern was whether or not the Class 319 EMUs offered, because of their build and four carriage configuration, would be able to negotiate the Merseyrail tunnel system safely.

== The December 2008 timetable change ==
December 2008 is notable as it brought extensive changes to the then Northern Rail timetable, to fit in with new increased-frequency services from Virgin Trains. Timings were altered on all services. Most Liverpool to Wigan daytime local stopping services had previously omitted Edge Hill, but all stopping services on the route now call there.

December 2008 also marked the withdrawal of two relatively infrequent but notable services on this line:

- The long distance Express services used to run from Liverpool Lime Street via St Helens Central and Wigan North Western to either Blackpool North, Morecambe and/or Barrow. Since December 2008, all Liverpool–Wigan line long-distance services run to Blackpool only, necessitating a change at Wigan North Western or Preston for the previously served destinations.
- A small number of commuter-timed trains used to run Liverpool via Wigan to Manchester. They provided a route from Liverpool via St Helens Central, Wigan, and Bolton to Manchester Victoria, though these were also withdrawn in the December 2008 timetable. Replicating this journey now necessitates a change at Wigan North Western, usually involving a walk to nearby Wigan Wallgate.
