= Alexandra Dock =

Alexandra Dock may refer to:

- Queen Alexandra Dock, Cardiff
- Alexandra Dock at Newport, South Wales, operated by the Alexandra (Newport and South Wales) Docks and Railway
- Alexandra Dock, Liverpool
  - Alexandra Dock railway station (LNWR)
  - Alexandra Dock railway station (Liverpool Overhead Railway) in Liverpool
  - Alexandra Dock branch, which served Bootle Balliol Road and Alexandra Dock (LNWR)
- Alexandra Dock, Grimsby
- Alexandra Dock, Hull
