= Gladstone Dock =

Dock in Liverpool, England

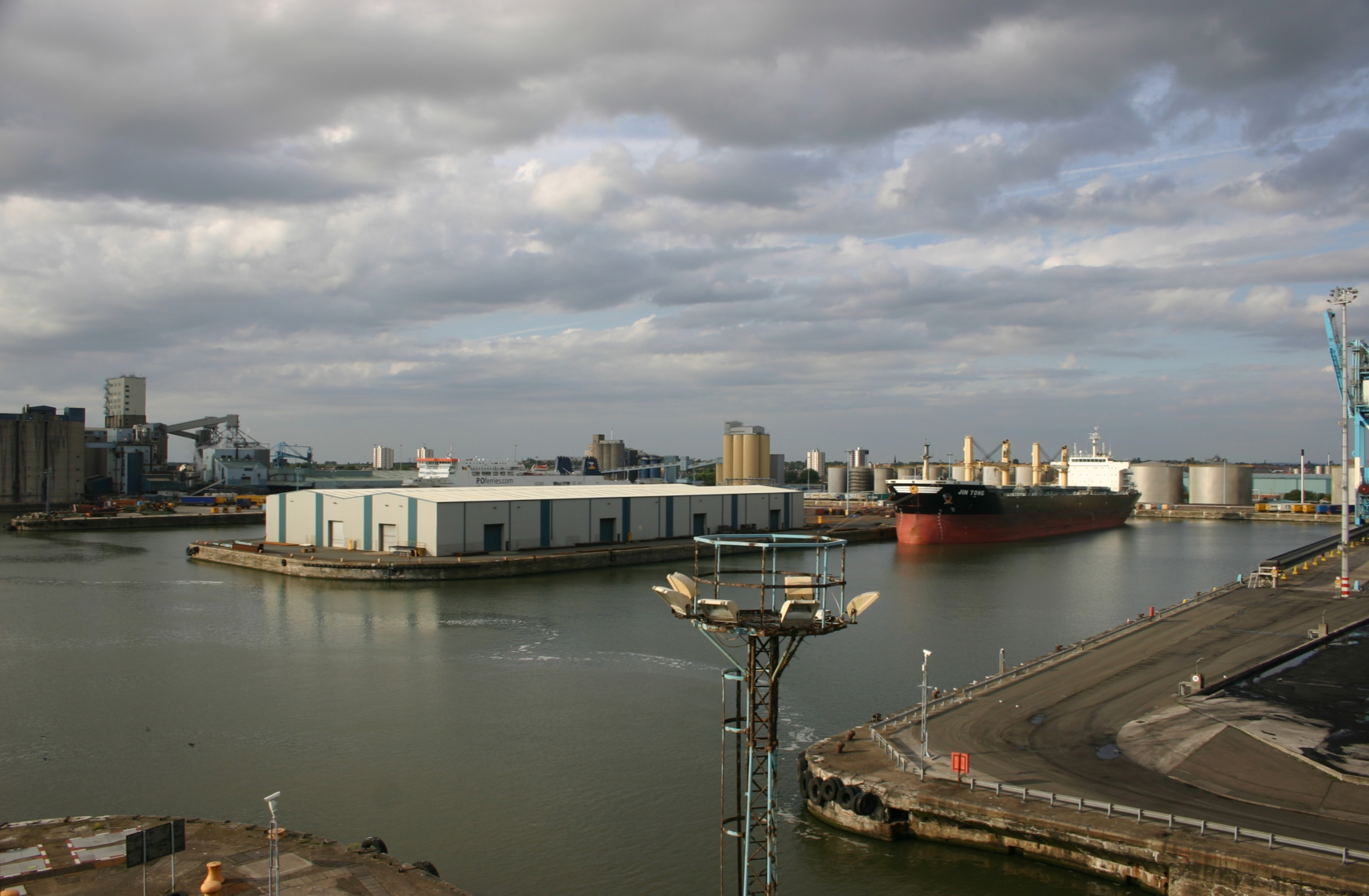
- Gladstone Dock, June 2009

Location
- Location: Bootle, Merseyside, United Kingdom
- Coordinates: 53.4549°N 3.0189°W
- OS grid: SJ323958

Details
- Owner: The Peel Group
- Operator: Mersey Docks and Harbour Company
- Opened: 1927
- Type: Wet dock
- Purpose: Cargo transfer
- Joins: River Mersey; Seaforth Dock; Hornby Dock
- Entries: 3
- Gates: 3 pairs
- Area: 58 acres (23 ha) (as built)
- Width at entrance: 130 ft (40 m)
- Quay length: 3 mi (4.8 km)
- Cargo type: Bulk; Ro-ro
- Transport links: A565 (road); Canada Dock branch (rail)

Gladstone Dock is a dock on the River Mersey, England, and part of the Port of Liverpool. It is situated in the northern dock system in Bootle. The dock is connected to Seaforth Dock to the north and what remains of Hornby Dock to the south. Part of Liverpool Freeport, Gladstone Dock is operated by the Mersey Docks and Harbour Company.

== History ==
The dock is named after Robert Gladstone, a merchant from Liverpool and second cousin of Prime Minister William Ewart Gladstone. Designed in the first decade of the twentieth century, construction was eventually completed in 1927 and consisted of 3 mi (4.8 km) of quays and extensive warehouse space.

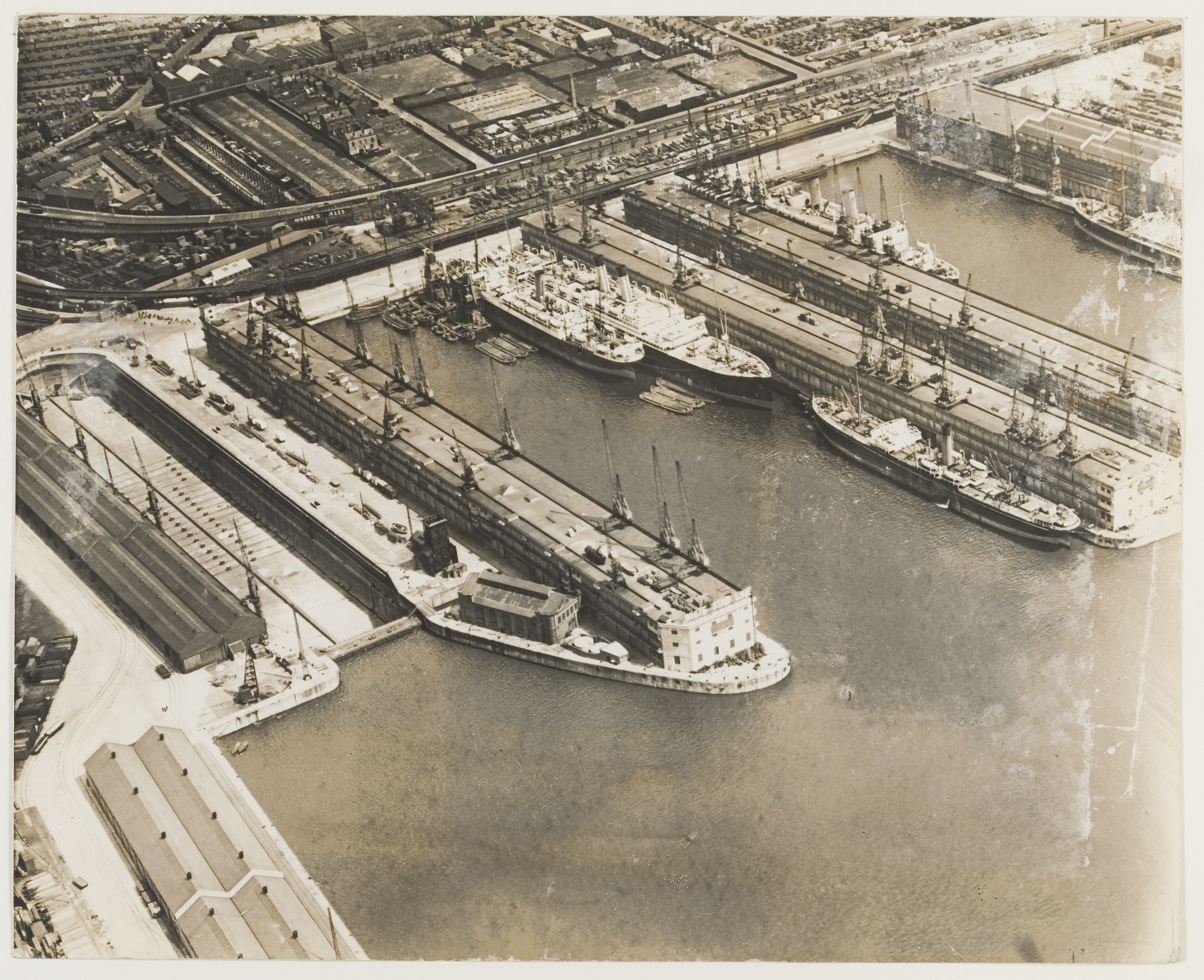
A pre-war image of Gladstone Dock

The graving dock was completed in 1913, before the rest of the dock became operational. At 1,050 ft (320 m) long and 120 ft (37 m) wide it was designed to take the largest trans-Atlantic steamers. The graving dock has since been converted into a wet dock (Gladstone Number Three Branch Dock).

Gladstone Dock lock entrance is one of the two remaining operational river entrances in the northern dock system. Measuring 1,070 ft (330 m) long,130 ft (40 m) wide and 42 ft (13 m) deep; was wider, longer and deeper than the Panama Canal locks at the time of opening. The Panama Canal and Gladstone locks could accommodate a maximum size of container ship of 4,500-5,000 twenty-foot-equivalent units (TEUs). The lock provided maritime access to the container terminal of the adjacent Royal Seaforth Dock, which opened in 1972.

However in 2016 the Panama Canal locks will were enlarged to a size larger than the Gladstone locks: 1,400 ft (430 m) long, 140 ft (43 m) wide and 60 ft (18 m) deep, accommodating vessels with capacities of up to 14,000 TEUs, depending on the vessel design. Rather than enlarge the Gladstone locks to match the size of the Panama locks, the Port of Liverpool built an in-river berth, in the tidal river, serving a new container terminal called Liverpool2. Container ships unable to enter the Gladstone lock will need to use the adjacent in-river berthing at Liverpool2. Liverpool2 solved the problem of the disruption of enlarging the Gladstone locks, and also giving container handling expansion.

Simultaneously the NY-NJ port in the USA deepened its access channel and raised the Bayonne Bridge to accommodate the large vessels transiting the Panama Canal. The expansions at Liverpool and New York means larger ships can operate between the two ports.

At the outbreak of the First World War, the liner RMS Aquitania was undergoing repairs in Gladstone Graving Dock. As a result, she was converted in situ for war service. During the Second World War, ASW ships, Atlantic convoy escorts and minesweepers were based in the dock. In 1942 the National Fire Service opened a fire station on Fort Road having a berth for some of its fireboats adjoining the NW Wall of the Dock, this remained open until 1946.

On 25 January 1953, the liner RMS Empress of Canada caught fire and capsized in Gladstone Number One Branch Dock. She was refloated the following year and towed to Gladstone Graving Dock to be made watertight, in preparation for being scrapped in Italy. Transatlantic passenger services continued to use the dock until all such services from Liverpool were discontinued in 1971.

The main line Gladstone Dock railway station closed to passengers on 7 July 1924 while the Liverpool Overhead Railway station Gladstone Dock (LOR) closed in 1956.

A new biomass terminal was built at the docks opening in 2015 with a second phase completed in 2016. Up to 10 trains per day will transport the biomass to power stations. Until 2023, Gladstone Dock was also used by P&O Ferries for their regular passenger and freight services from Liverpool to Dublin.

== Current use ==
As part of Liverpool Freeport, Gladstone Dock's principal uses are: importing coal for the adjacent Hornby Dock coal processing facility, importing biomass from North America at the biomass terminal and exporting scrap metal to the Far East.

== Gallery ==
Gladstone dock Liverpool

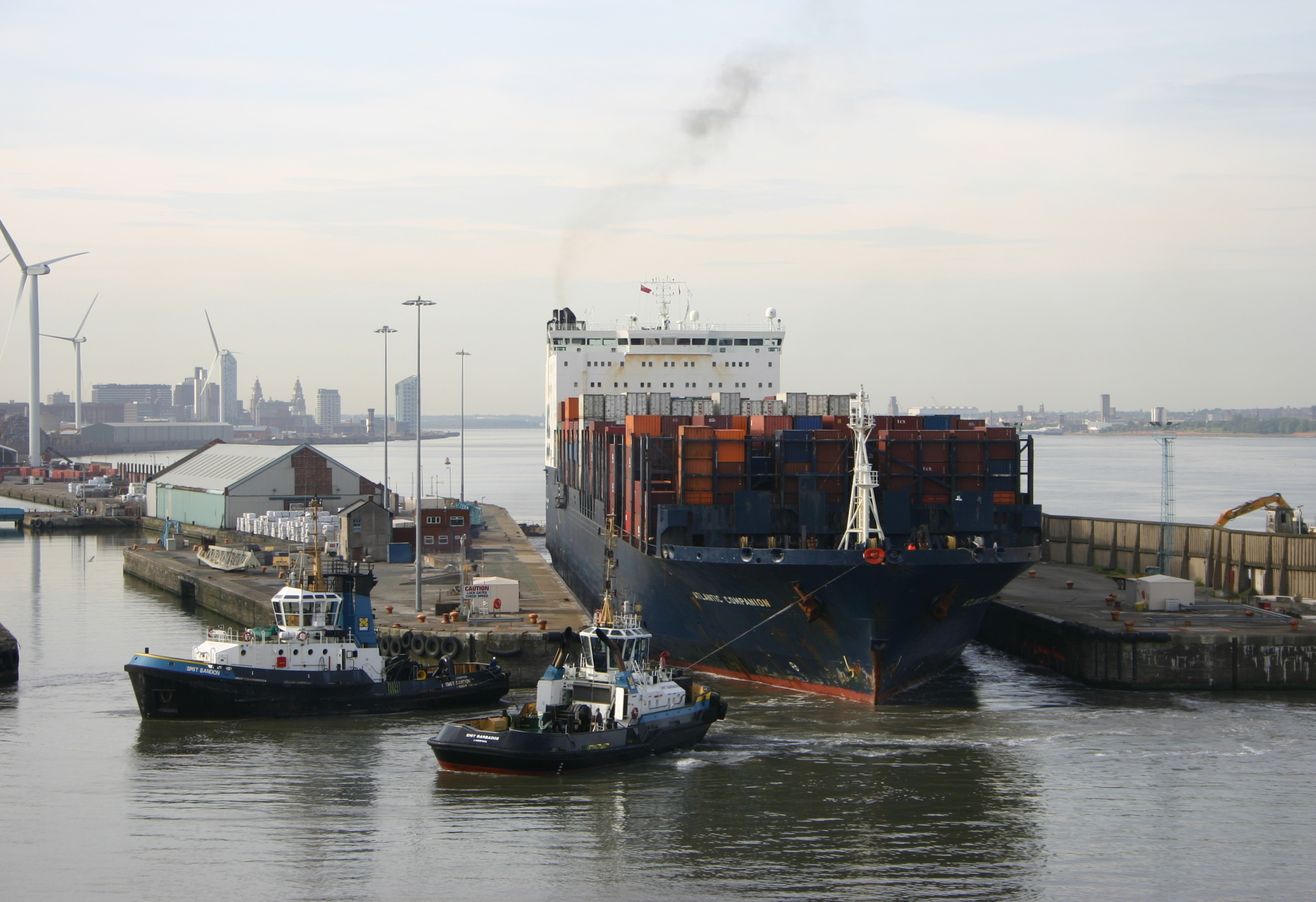
Gladstone Lock, arrival Atlantic Container Line vessel (2015)

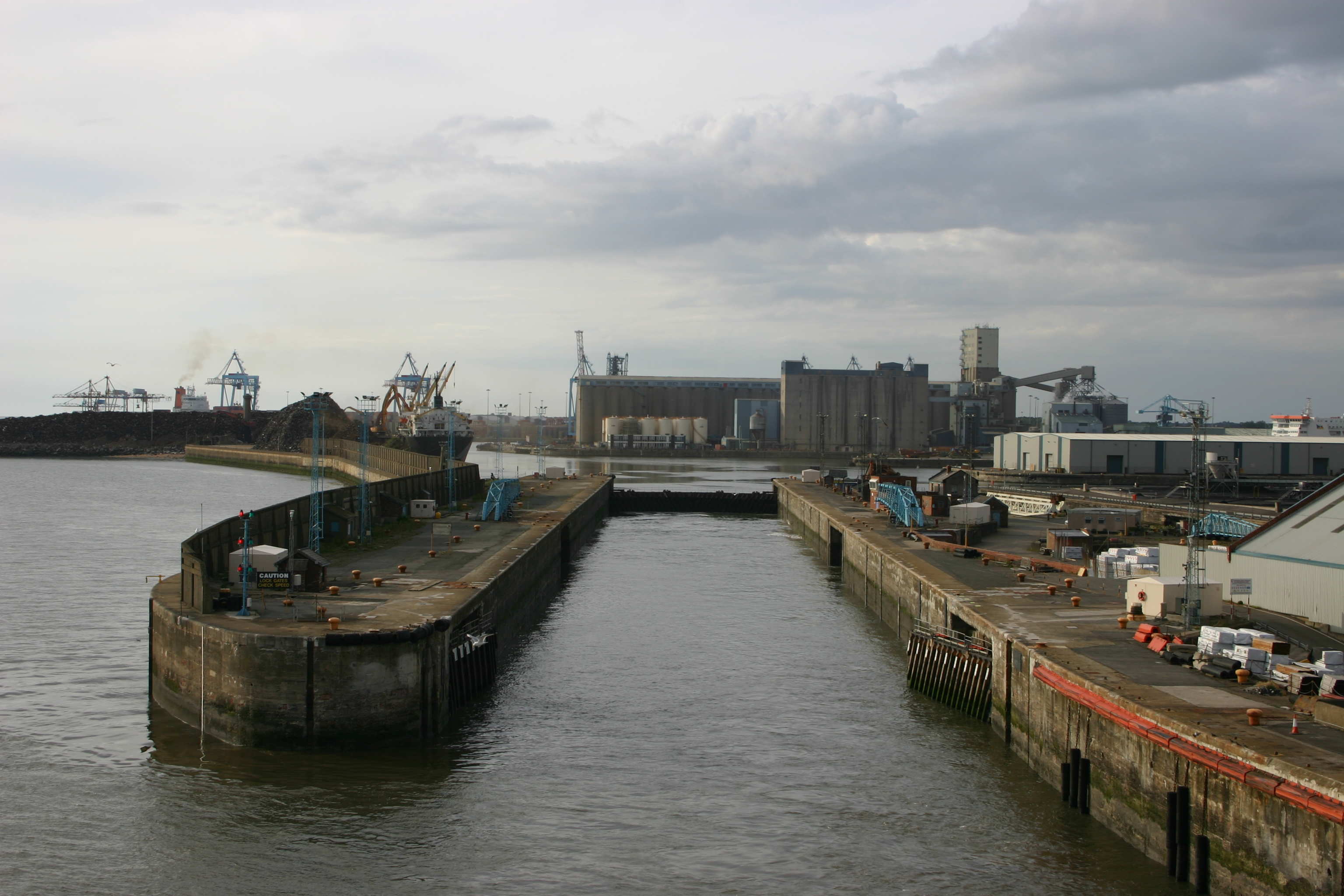
Gladstone Lock (2009)

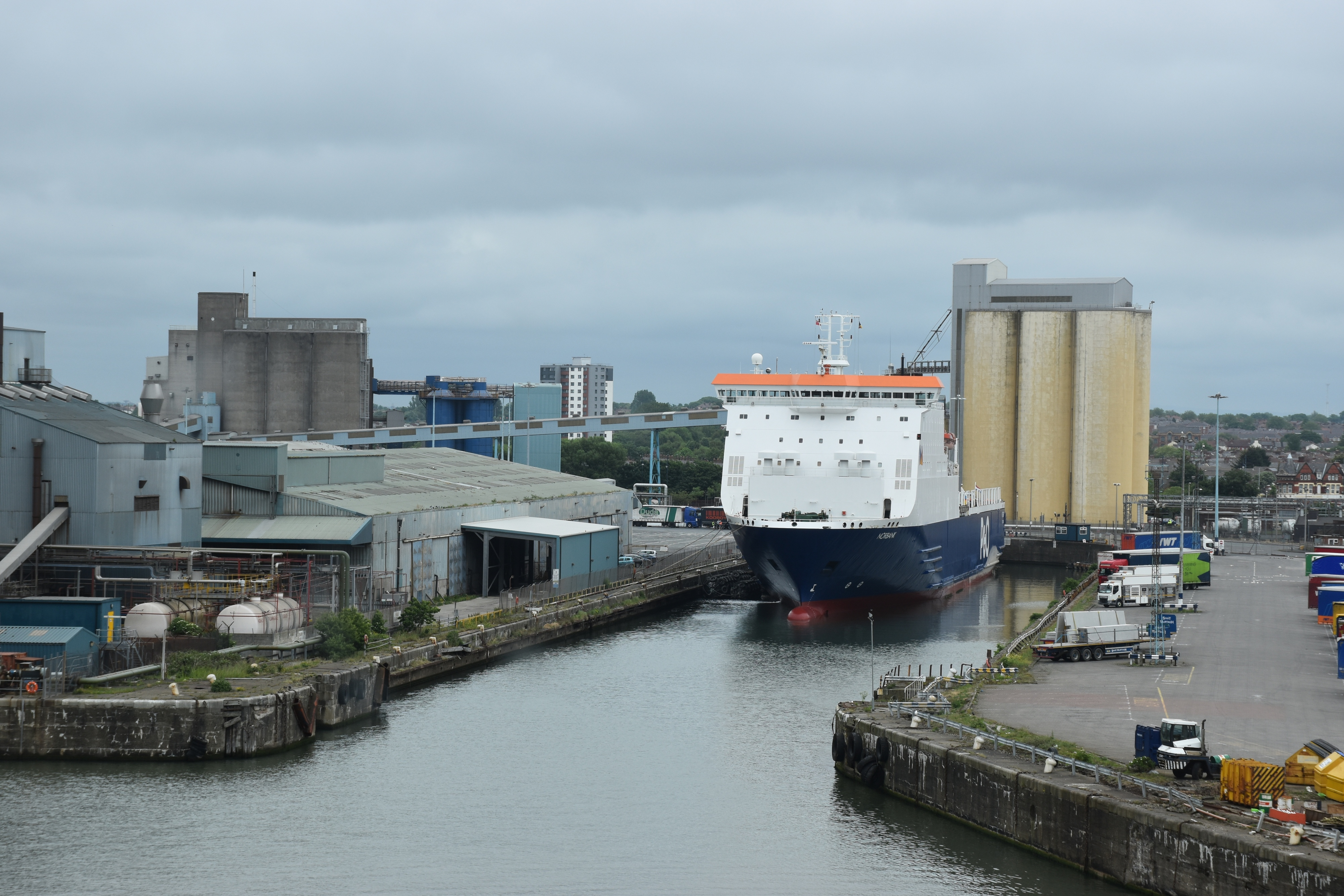
Former Gladstone graving dock (2017)

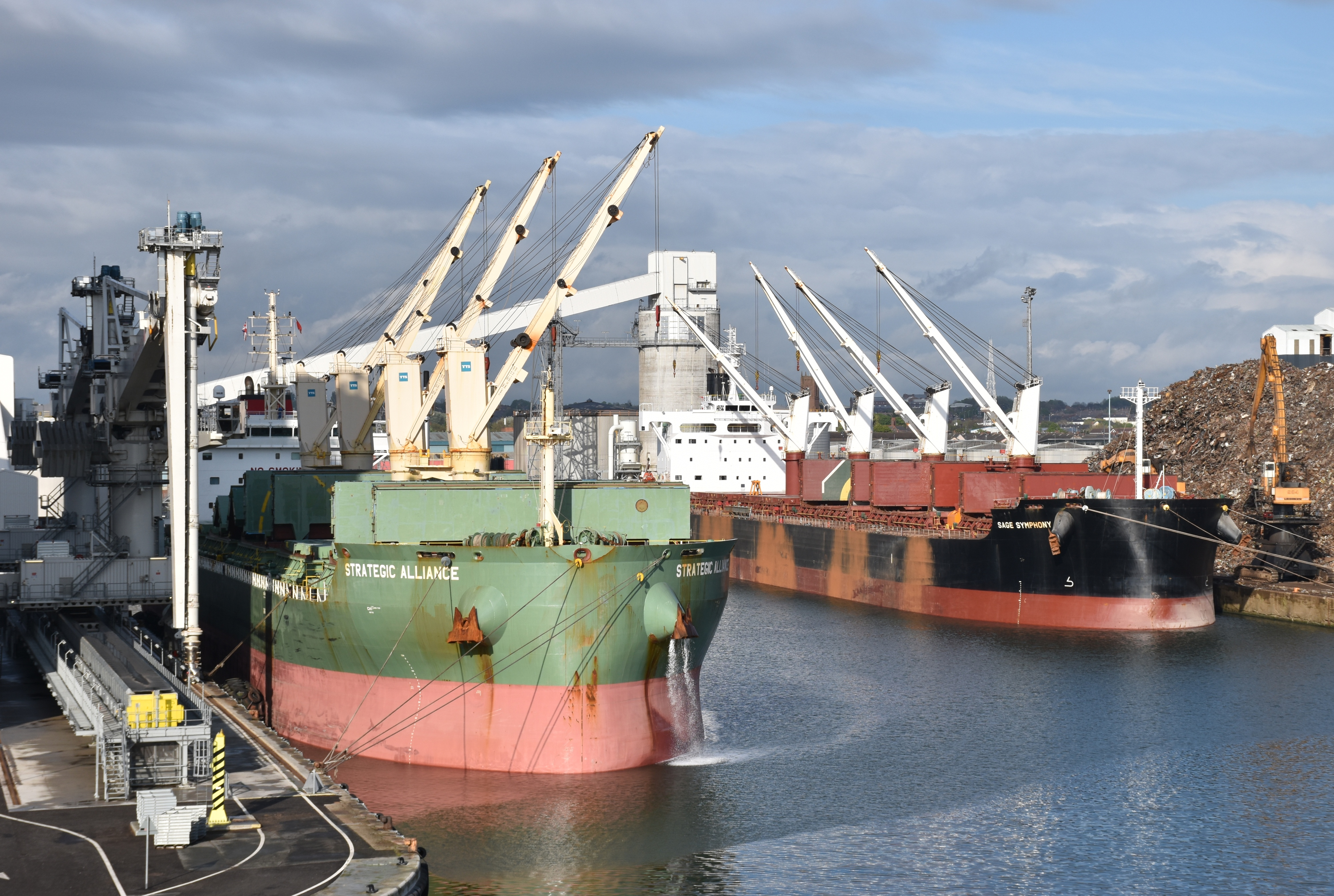
Gladstone branch Dock No.1 (2018)

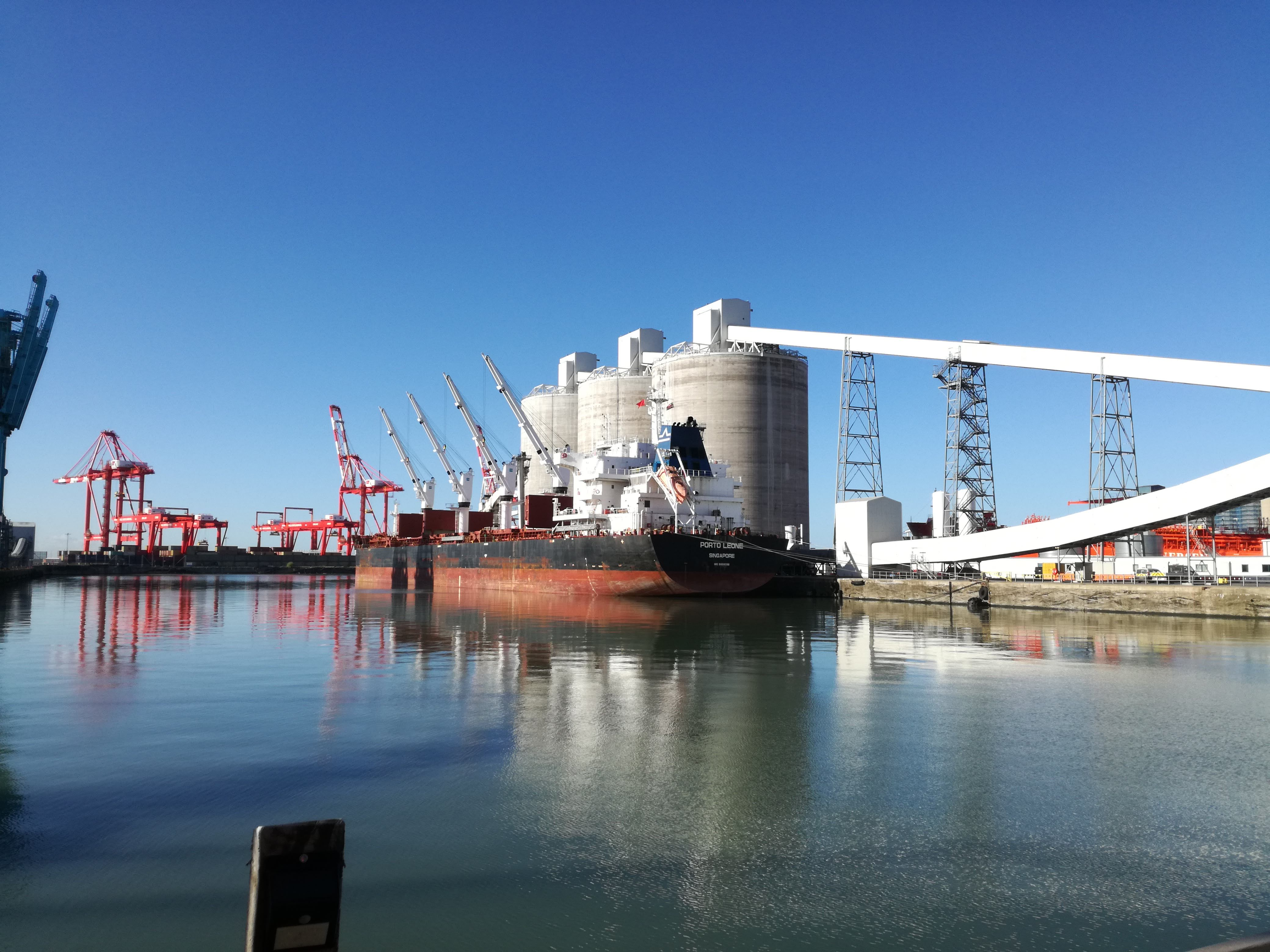
Biomass terminal at Gladstone branch Dock No.1 (2018)
