= Edge Lane railway station =

Former railway station in England

Edge Lane

General information
- Location: Fairfield, Liverpool; England
- Coordinates: 53.4099°N 2.9272°W
- Grid reference: SJ383907
- Platforms: 2

Other information
- Status: Disused

History
- Original company: London and North Western Railway
- Pre-grouping: London and North Western Railway
- Post-grouping: London, Midland and Scottish Railway

Key dates
- 1 July 1870: Opened
- 31 May 1948: Closed
Location

Edge Lane railway station was on the Canada Dock Branch in Liverpool, England.

The station opened in July 1870 and closed on 31 May 1948. Freight trains to and from Seaforth Docks still pass through the station site.

Preceding station	Disused railways	Following station
Stanley; Line and station closed	London and North Western Railway; Canada Dock Branch	Edge Hill; Line closed, station open
Stanley; Line and station closed	London and North Western Railway; Olive Mount chord	Broad Green; Line closed, station open
