= Walton & Anfield railway station =

Former railway station in England

Walton and Anfield

General information
- Location: Walton, Liverpool; England
- Coordinates: 53.4428°N 2.9606°W
- Grid reference: SJ363944
- Line: Canada Dock Branch
- Platforms: 2

Other information
- Status: Disused

History
- Original company: London & North Western Railway
- Pre-grouping: London & North Western Railway
- Post-grouping: London Midland and Scottish Railway

Key dates
- 1 July 1870: Opened as Walton for Aintree
- 1 January 1910: Renamed Walton & Anfield
- 31 May 1948: Closed
Location

Walton & Anfield railway station was located near Goodison Park on the Canada Dock Branch to east side of Walton Lane in Walton, Liverpool, England.

== History ==
The station opened on 1 July 1870 and closed to passengers on 31 May 1948.

The site came to national attention in 1993 for being near to the scene where the toddler James Bulger was found dead, after having been abducted and murdered by Robert Thompson and Jon Venables.

Merseytravel have held talks about re-opening the Canada Dock Branch to passengers.

In 2017 traces of the platforms could still be seen. Freight trains to and from Seaforth Dock still pass through the station site. It was announced in December 2019 that Liverpool City Council had commissioned a feasibility study to see about reopening the Canada Dock Branch to passenger traffic.

Preceding station	Disused railways	Following station
Spellow; Line and station closed	London and North Western Railway; Canada Dock Branch	Breck Road; Line and station closed
