= Breck Road railway station =

Disused railway station in England

Breck Road
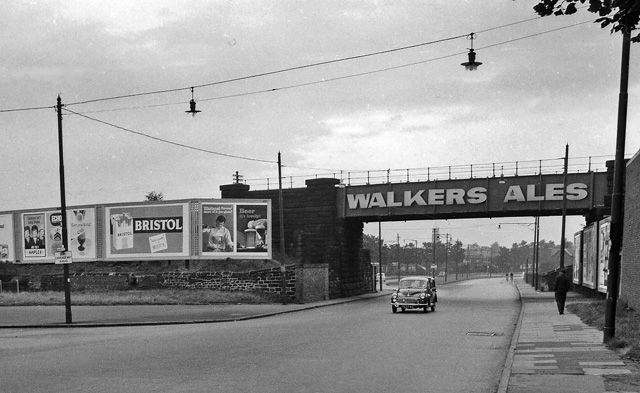

General information
- Location: Clubmoor, Liverpool; England
- Coordinates: 53.4327°N 2.9401°W
- Grid reference: SJ376933
- Line: Canada Dock Branch
- Platforms: 2

Other information
- Status: Disused

History
- Original company: London & North Western Railway
- Pre-grouping: London & North Western Railway
- Post-grouping: London Midland and Scottish Railway

Key dates
- 1 July 1870: Opened
- 31 May 1948: Closed
Location

Breck Road railway station was located on the Canada Dock Branch to the north of Townsend Lane between Anfield and Clubmoor, Liverpool, England. It opened on 1 July 1870 and closed on 31 May 1948.

By 2017 the only trace of the station was a bricked-up entrance at street level, but freight trains to and from Seaforth Dock still pass through the station site over the bridge. It was announced in December 2019 that Liverpool City Council had commissioned a feasibility study to see about reopening the Canada Dock Branch to passenger traffic.

Preceding station	Disused railways	Following station
Walton & Anfield; Line and station closed	London and North Western Railway; Canada Dock Branch	Tue Brook; Line and station closed
