= Spellow railway station =

Former railway station in England

Spellow

General information
- Location: Walton, Liverpool; England
- Coordinates: 53.4428°N 2.9705°W
- Grid reference: SJ356944
- Platforms: 2

Other information
- Status: Disused

History
- Original company: London and North Western Railway
- Pre-grouping: London and North Western Railway
- Post-grouping: London Midland and Scottish Railway

Key dates
- September 1882: Opened
- 31 May 1948: Closed
Location

Spellow railway station was located on County Road, Walton in Liverpool, England.

== History ==
The station opened in September 1882 on the Canada Dock Branch, which ran from the docks north of Liverpool to Edge Hill.

The station building was at street level, with steps at the back leading down to the platforms which were situated in a deep rock cutting.

The station closed to passengers on 31 May 1948, but the line continued to be used by passenger trains running from Liverpool Lime Street to Southport Chapel Street. This ceased in 1977, but freight trains to and from Seaforth Dock still pass through the station site.

It was proposed that Spellow station would reopen to passengers in 1977 as part of the new Merseyrail network, along with other stations on the branch. Although this never happened it remains a possibility in the future if Merseyrail decides to extend their current network. It was announced in December 2019 that Liverpool City Council had commissioned a feasibility study to see about reopening the Canada Dock Branch to passenger traffic.

The station building still stands and is currently in use by a bookmaker.

Preceding station	Disused railways	Following station
Canada Dock; Line and station closed	London and North Western Railway; Canada Dock Branch	Walton & Anfield; Line and station closed
Bootle Balliol Road; Line and station closed	London and North Western Railway; Alexandra Dock Branch	Walton & Anfield; Line and station closed
Bootle Oriel Road; Line closed, station open	Lancashire and Yorkshire Railway; Liverpool, Crosby and Southport Railway	Walton & Anfield; Line and station closed
