= Tue Brook railway station =

Former railway station in England

Tue Brook

General information
- Location: Tuebrook, Liverpool; England
- Coordinates: 53.4243°N 2.9353°W
- Grid reference: SJ379924
- Line: Canada Dock Branch
- Platforms: 2

Other information
- Status: Disused

History
- Original company: London & North Western Railway
- Pre-grouping: London & North Western Railway
- Post-grouping: London Midland and Scottish Railway

Key dates
- 1 July 1870: Opened
- 31 May 1948: Closed to passengers
- 27 November 1967: Closed completely
Location

Tue Brook railway station was located on the north side of West Derby Road, Tuebrook, Liverpool, England, opposite Newsham Park on the Canada Dock Branch.

== History ==
The station opened on 1 July 1870 and closed to passengers on 31 May 1948. Trains to and from Seaforth Dock still pass through the station site.

== Future ==
Merseytravel have made several mentions of re-opening the station as part of a plan of using the Canada Dock/Bootle Branch for passenger services. The October 2017 Liverpool City Region Combined Authority update to the Long Term Rail Strategy mentions the re-opening of the line to passenger use with new stations at Anfield, Tue Brook and Edge Lane.

Preceding station	Disused railways	Following station
Breck Road; Line and station closed	London and North Western Railway; Canada Dock Branch	Stanley; Line and station closed
