= Tuebrook =

Area of Liverpool, England

Coordinates: 53.429°N 2.934°W

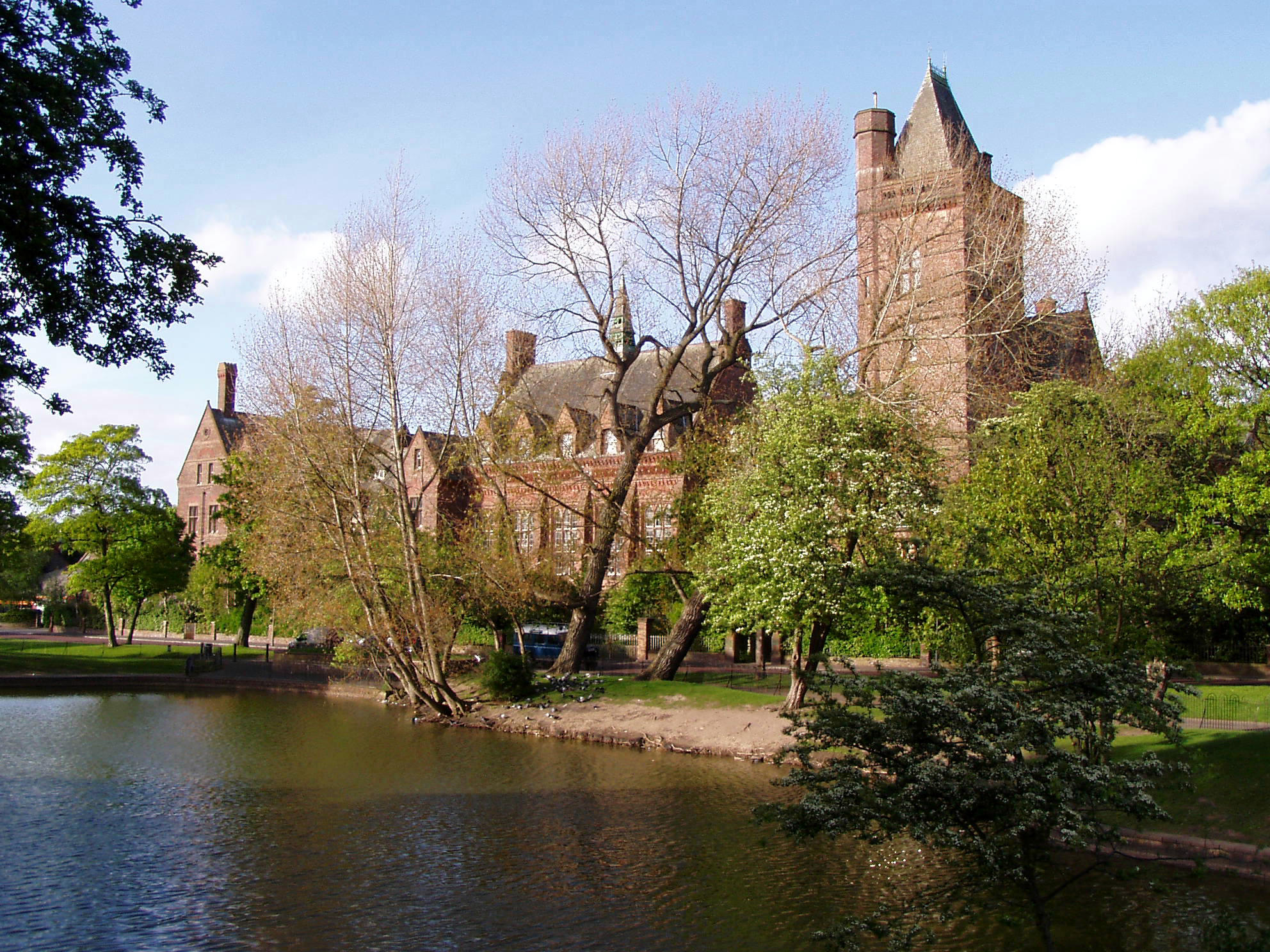
- Liverpool Seamen's Orphan Institution, Newsham Park

- Location within Merseyside
- Population: 14,490 (2001 Census)
- OS grid reference: SJ379928
- Metropolitan borough: Liverpool
- Metropolitan county: Merseyside
- Region: North West
- Country: England
- Sovereign state: United Kingdom
- Post town: LIVERPOOL
- Postcode district: L6, L13
- Dialling code: 0151
- Police: Merseyside
- Fire: Merseyside
- Ambulance: North West
- UK Parliament: Liverpool West Derby

Tuebrook (or Tue Brook; locally /ˈtʃuːbruːk, -brʊk/) is an area in the north-east of Liverpool, England. At the 2001 census the population was 14,490.

== Toponymy ==
The origin of the name may be Tew Brook, a tributary of the Alt. The brook itself is now almost entirely piped or culverted, with the last exposed section at the back of a disused cinema.

== Description ==
Tuebrook includes Newsham Park, the Victorian, Grade I listed building St John's Church, Tuebrook Market and Tuebrook Police Station, which is now closed to the public although still in use by Merseyside Police. It is part of the Parliamentary Constituency of Liverpool West Derby. A unique characteristic of the main shopping street is that all shops are on one side of the street only. This is largely due to extensive demolition during upgrading of the main road.

Tuebrook has two secondary schools nearby: West Derby School located on Mill Bank and St Francis of Assisi in Newsham Park.

The Musical Box, on West Derby Road, is Liverpool's oldest independent record shop, having been established in 1947 by Dorothy Cain and run by the same family for four generations.

== Government ==
For representation to the House of Commons, the area is within the Liverpool West Derby Parliamentary constituency.

== Transport ==
There are regular buses (numbers 12, 13, 15, 18, 62, 68 and variants thereof) providing services to the city centre, as well as to Aigburth, Bootle, Croxteth, Huyton and Old Swan and Stockbridge village.

The area is bisected by the A5049 West Derby Road, an east/west arterial route out of Liverpool city centre. Tuebrook also has a railway line which carries freight from Tuebrook sidings near Edge Hill to the Port of Liverpool in the north. The bridge, carrying the Canada Dock Branch over West Derby Road, used to accommodate Tue Brook railway station until 1948.

The Merseytram System (Line 1) was scheduled to run through Tuebrook prior to the abandonment of the project when funding from the Government was denied.

Tue Brook railway station used to serve the area, however the line was closed from passenger traffic in 1948. The line itself (Canada Dock Branch) is still a busy goods route. It was announced in December 2019 that Liverpool City Council had commissioned a feasibility study to consider reopening the Canada Dock Branch to passenger traffic.
