= Bootle Balliol Road railway station =

Disused railway station in Bootle, Sefton

Bootle Balliol Road
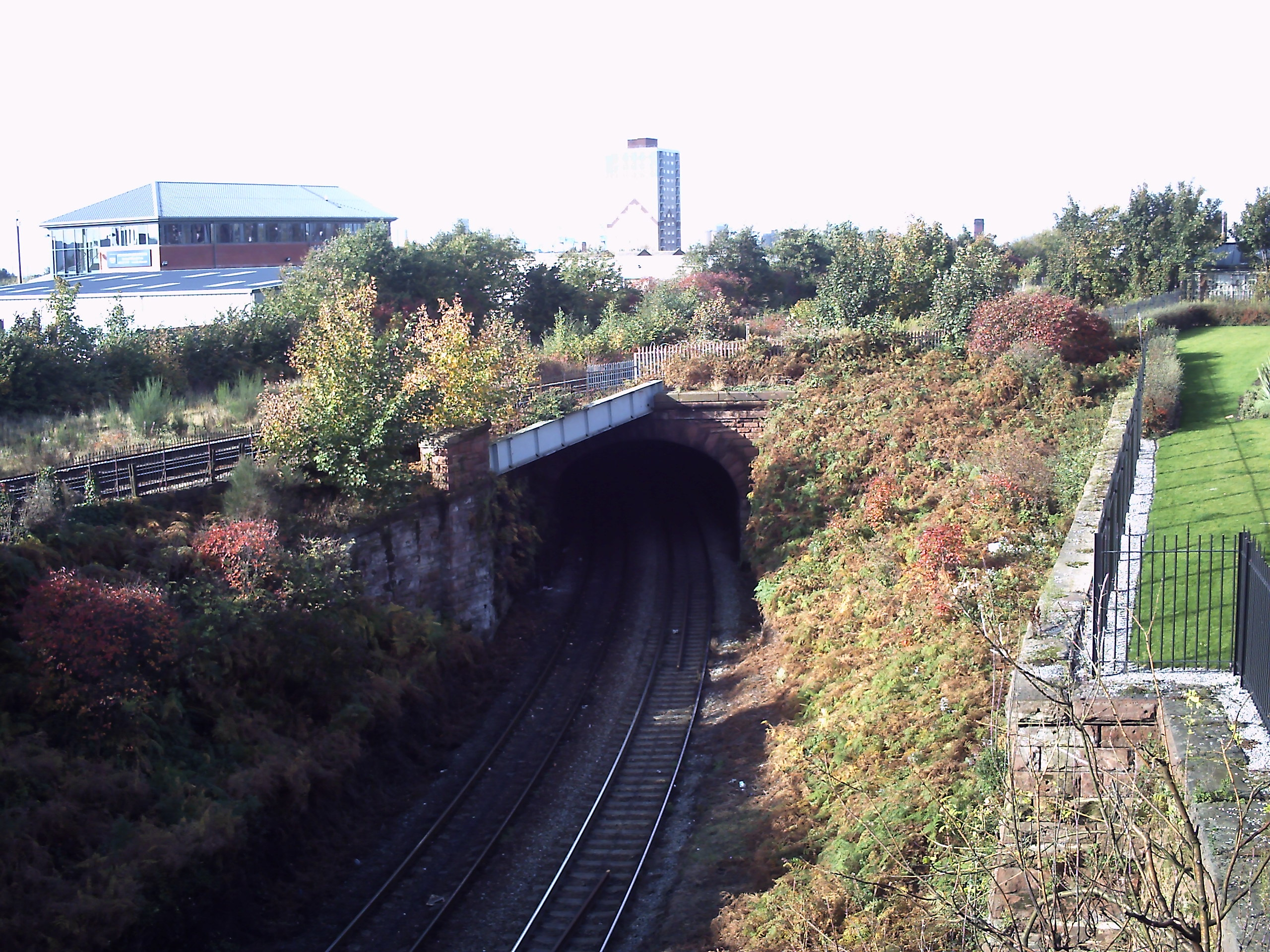
- Balliol Road's platforms would have ended just before the tunnel

General information
- Location: Bootle, Sefton; England
- Coordinates: 53.4448°N 2.9948°W
- Grid reference: SJ 340 946
- Platforms: 2

Other information
- Status: Disused

History
- Original company: London and North Western Railway
- Pre-grouping: London and North Western Railway
- Post-grouping: London Midland and Scottish Railway

Key dates
- 5 September 1881: Opened as Balliol Road
- 1 January 1891: Renamed Bootle Balliol Road
- 31 May 1948: Last passenger train called
- 26 February 1949: Officially closed
Location

Balliol Road railway station was on the Alexandra Dock Branch, Bootle, Merseyside, England, it opened on 5 September 1881 and closed to passengers on 31 May 1948. Goods trains to and from Seaforth Dock still pass through the station site.

Preceding station	Disused railways	Following station
Alexandra Dock; Line and station closed	London and North Western Railway; Alexandra Dock Branch	Spellow; Line and station closed
