= Alexandra Dock, Liverpool =

Alexandra Dock
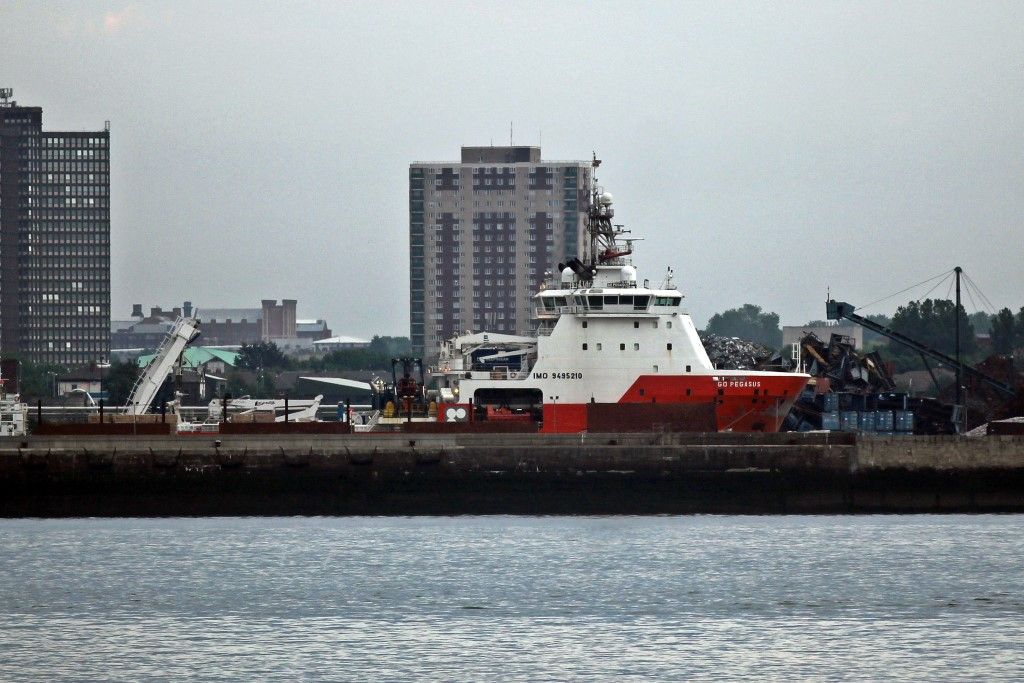
- "Go Pegasus" in Alexandra Dock, seen from across the River Mersey

Location
- Location: Bootle, Merseyside, United Kingdom
- Coordinates: 53.4474°N 3.0120°W
- OS grid: SJ328849

Details
- Owner: Peel Holdings
- Operator: Mersey Docks and Harbour Company
- Opened: 1881
- Type: Wet dock
- Joins: Hornby Dock; Langton Dock
- Area: 44 acres (18 ha)
- Transport links: Canada Dock Branch (rail)

Alexandra Dock is a dock on the River Mersey, England, and part of the Port of Liverpool. It is situated in the northern dock system in Bootle. Alexandra Dock consists of a main basin nearest the river wall and three branch docks to the east, with the southern branch mostly filled in.

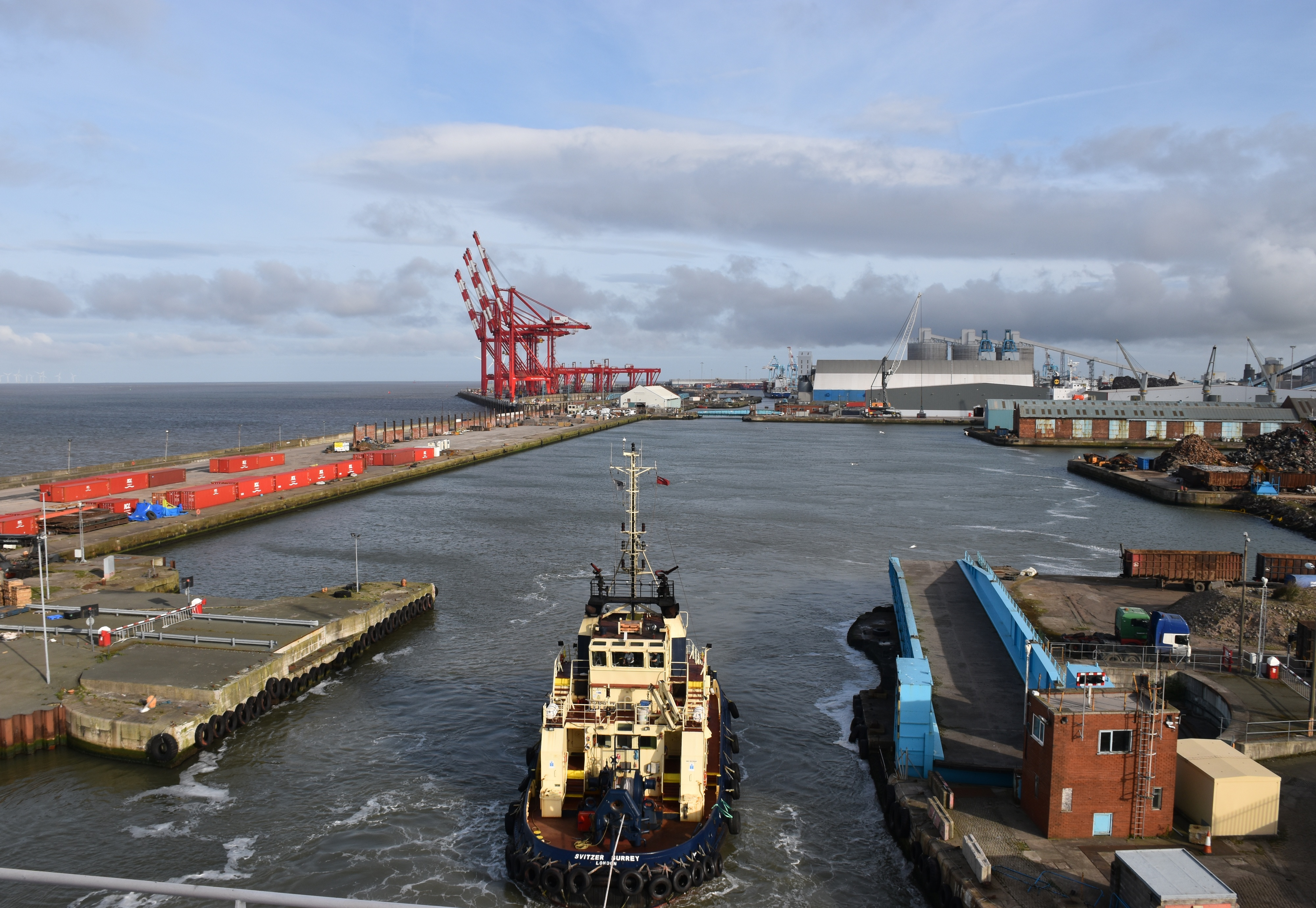
Alexandra Dock, April 2017.

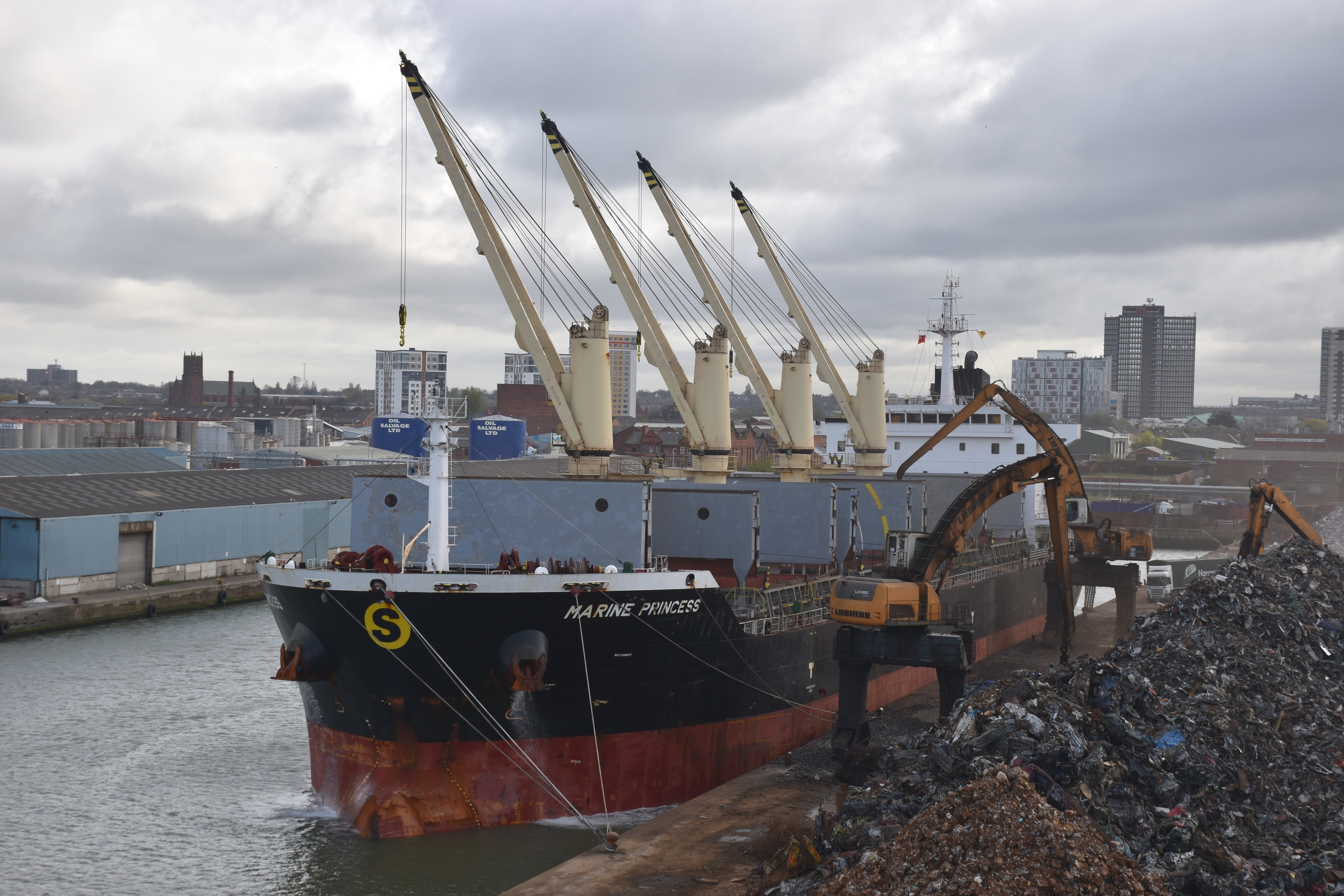
Loading steel scrap at Alexandra Dock, April 2017.

== History ==
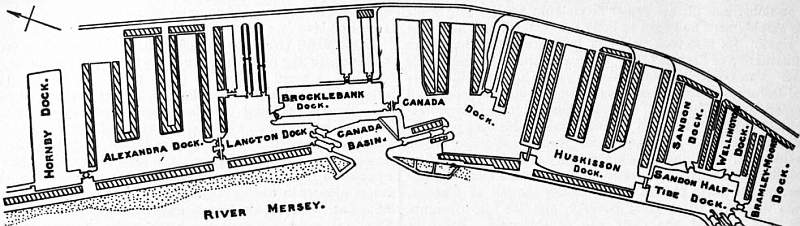
Northern docks of Liverpool

The dock was built by George Fosbery Lyster between 1874 and 1882. During its construction, the dock was known as Atlantic Dock for about a year. Opened in 1881 and named in honour of Queen Alexandra, the dock has three branch docks and is connected to Hornby Dock to the north and Langton Dock to the south. Initially, access was through Langton Dock and the problematic Canada Basin.

Prior to the construction of Seaforth Dock, Alexandra Dock was involved in the grain trade. The grain silos had a 110,000 ton capacity, with floor space for a further 20,000 tons. The dock also had refrigeration facilities, which were provided by Union Cold Storage, for imported frozen meat. When built, the cold store was the largest in Europe with a capacity of 2,668,000 cu ft (75,500 m^{3}). The facility was built at the end of No. 3 Branch Dock, and allowed direct transfer to ships in No. 2 Branch Dock.

The dock was served by LNWR Alexandra Dock railway station and the Liverpool Overhead Railway's Alexandra Dock (LOR) railway station.

Latterly, its main export is recycled scrap metal.
