= Canada Dock railway station =

Disused railway station in England

Canada Dock

General information
- Location: Liverpool, Liverpool; England
- Coordinates: 53.43506°N 2.99191°W
- Grid reference: SJ341936
- Platforms: 1

Other information
- Status: Disused

History
- Original company: London and North Western Railway
- Pre-grouping: London and North Western Railway
- Post-grouping: London, Midland and Scottish Railway

Key dates
- 1 July 1870: Opened as Bootle
- 5 September 1881: Renamed Canada Dock
- 5 May 1941: Closed to passengers
- 12 September 1982: Closed
Location

Canada Dock railway station was the passenger terminus of the Canada Dock Branch, situated near Canada Dock, Liverpool, England.

== History ==
The station opened on 1 July 1870 as Bootle, being renamed Canada Dock on 5 September 1881.

The station closed to passengers on 5 May 1941 as a result of damage in the Liverpool Blitz, the goods operation continued until 1982, when the branch was closed from Atlantic junction.

Despite closure in 1941 and track lifting in 1983 the station was virtually intact in 1985. It has since been demolished and the land redeveloped.

Preceding station	Disused railways	Following station
Terminus	London and North Western Railway; Canada Dock Branch	Spellow; Line and station closed
