= Hornby Dock =

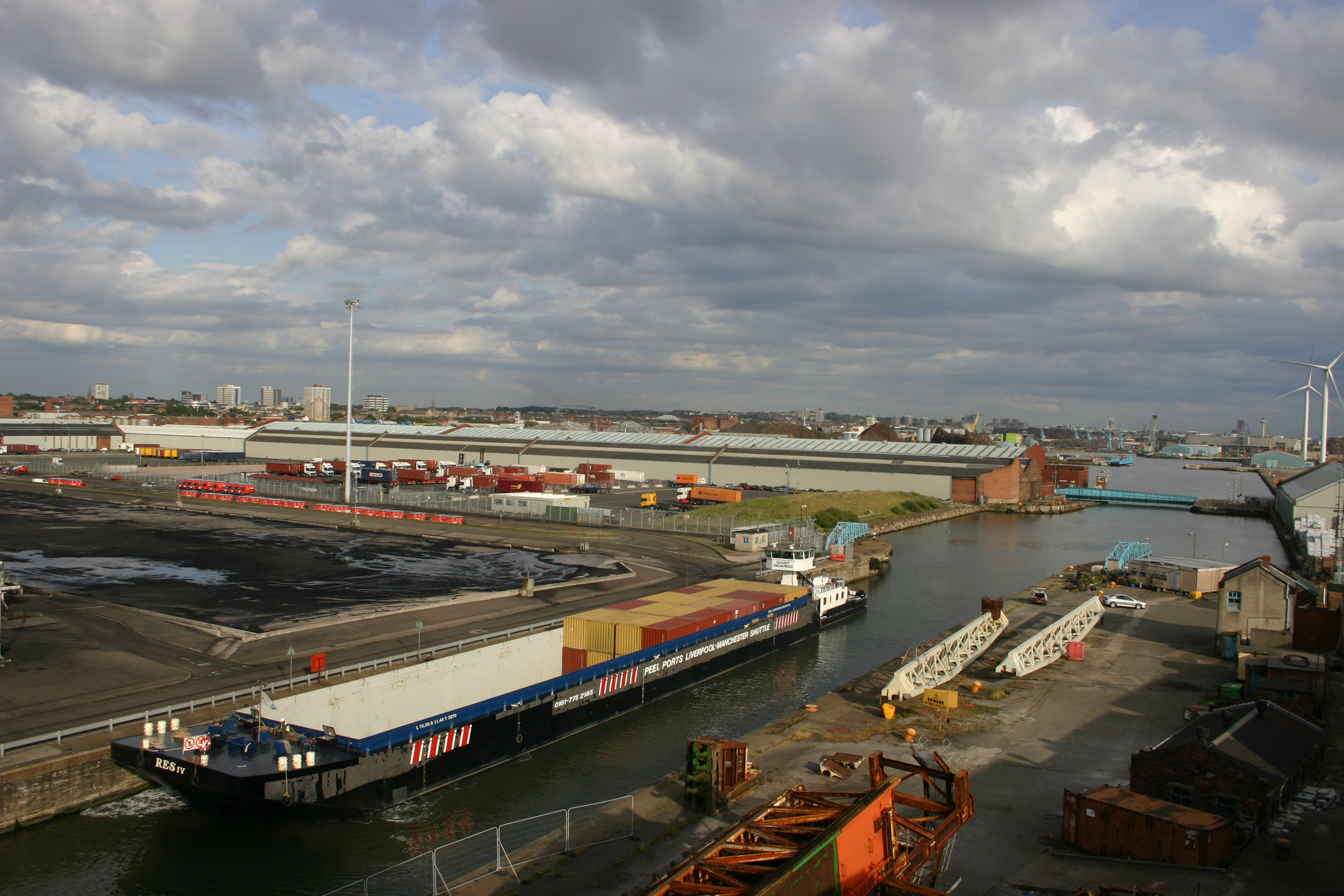
- An overview of the Hornby Dock area in June 2009

Location
- Location: Bootle, Merseyside, United Kingdom
- Coordinates: 53.4518°N 3.0129°W
- OS grid: SJ326953

Details
- Owner: The Peel Group
- Operator: Mersey Docks and Harbour Company
- Opened: 1884
- Type: Wet dock
- Joins: Gladstone Dock; Alexandra Dock

Hornby Dock was a dock located on the River Mersey, England, and part of the Port of Liverpool. It was situated in the northern dock system in Bootle. It connected to Gladstone Dock to the north and Alexandra Dock to the south and encompassed a sloping quayside.

== History ==
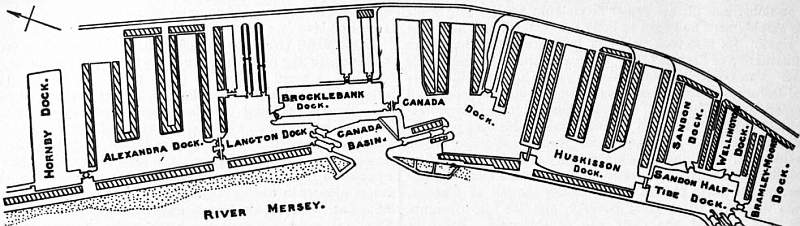
Northern docks of Liverpool

The dock was built by George Fosbery Lyster between 1880-3. Opened in 1884, Hornby Dock marked the completion of Liverpool dock system's period of expansion in the nineteenth century. The dock was named after Thomas Dyson Hornby, chairman of the Mersey Docks and Harbour Board between 1876 and 1889, and was used by the timber trade during its early years. The dock had a lighthouse which, because of its foghorn, was known as the Bootle Bull. The lighthouse was demolished in 1928, being replaced by one built north of Gladstone Dock. In 1940, during World War II, the Hornby River Entrance was bombed and very badly damaged, which restricted use of the dock throughout the war. The dock was still receiving significant traffic by 1992, mainly in the form of general cargo and containers, with new quayside sheds being built.

== Present ==
Apart from an access channel along the river wall, the dock has been filled in to provide additional space for the coal terminal at Gladstone Dock.
