= Liverpool2 =

Container terminal on the River Mersey, England

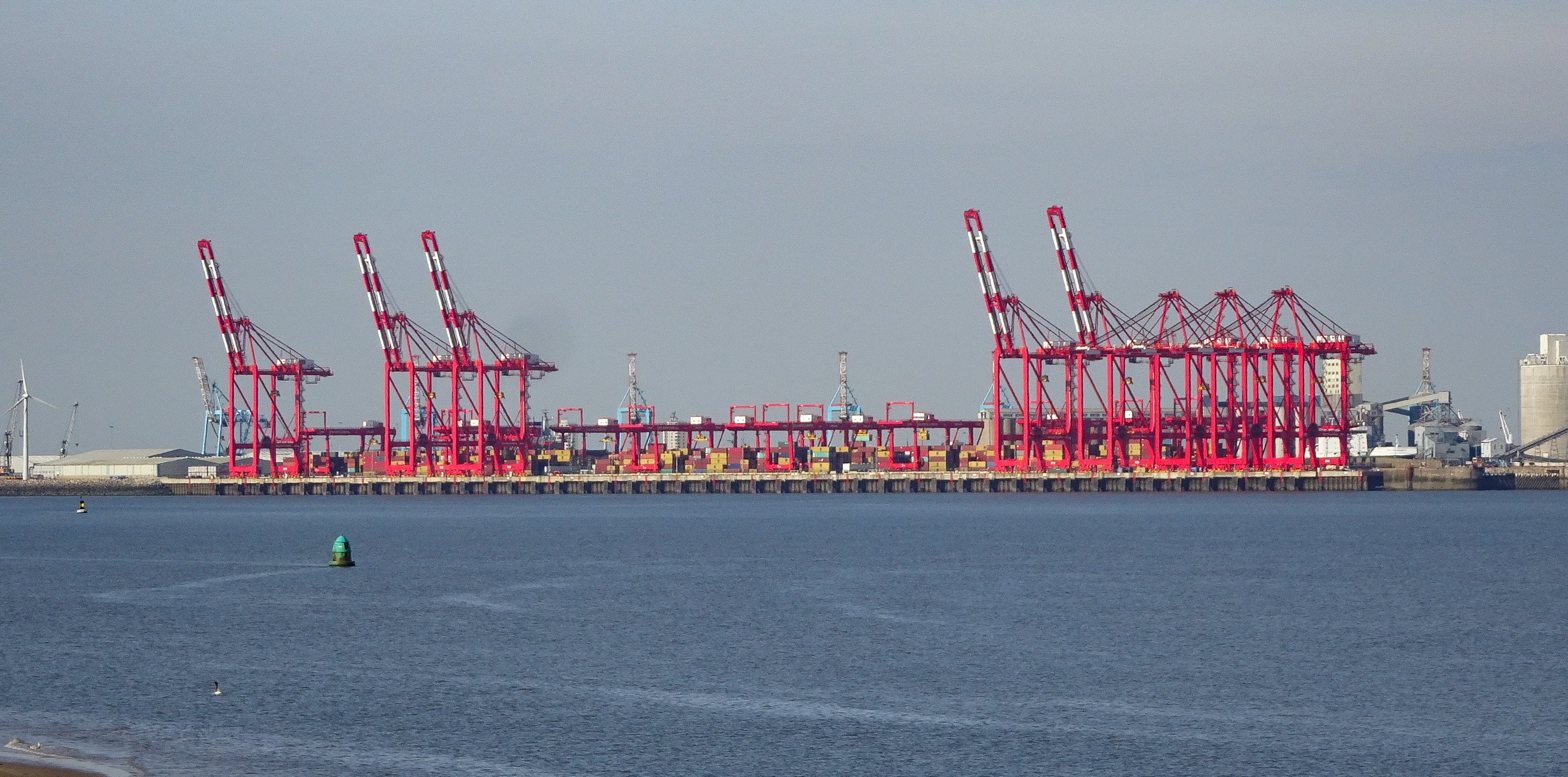
- Liverpool2 as seen from Seacombe in September 2020.

Location
- Location: Seaforth, Merseyside, England
- Coordinates: 53.453°N 3.023°W
- OS grid: SJ321956

Details
- Owner: The Peel Group
- Operator: Mersey Docks and Harbour Company
- Opened: 4 November 2016
- Type: Wharf
- Purpose: Cargo transfer
- Minimum depth: 16.5 m (54 ft)
- Quay length: 850 m (2,790 ft)
- Cranes: 8 container cranes, 22 CRMG cranes (in use)
- Cargo type: Container
- Transport links: A565; A5036 (road); Canada Dock branch (rail)

Liverpool2 is a container terminal extension adjoining the River Mersey in Seaforth, Merseyside. The extension, built by Peel Ports, officially opened on 4 November 2016 and is an expansion of the Seaforth Dock container terminal.

== Development ==
The groundbreaking ceremony was held on 6 June 2013, with Bobby Charlton and Kenny Dalglish present at the event. The emplacement of steel pilings commenced from October 2013 utilising 329 piles, weighing 47 tonnes each. In total, 19,000 tonnes of metalwork was used to form a 30 m (98 ft)-high, and 854 m (2,802 ft)-long, quay wall.

By July 2014, dredging of a 27 km^{2} (10 sq mi) area of the River Mersey approach channel had been commenced by Van Oord. The extension was built on reclaimed land using the material dredged from the River Mersey, with the deepened approach channel providing the necessary clearance for visiting ships. Construction was delayed by 60 days during winter storms in 2014. 5.5m tonnes of material was dredged, involving a workforce of 440 specialists.

The first five ZPMC-built Megamax ship-to-shore cranes were all on the quayside by November 2015, having been delivered from Shanghai, with eight of these cranes ultimately planned for the site. The first five cranes were delivered by the ship Zhen Hua 23. The intended opening date of December 2015 was missed, being moved to the summer of 2016, and ultimately rescheduled for the autumn. A first batch of six ZPMC-built cantilever rail-mounted gantry cranes were delivered to the site in May 2016, arriving from Nantong aboard the ship Zhen Hua 25. Berthing trials began in June 2016, with MSC vessels participating in the procedures throughout the following months. A further six gantry cranes were added in October 2016; these being delivered by the ship Zhen Hua 8, also from Nantong. The extension was built at a cost of £400m and ultimately opened on 4 November 2016 by Liam Fox, the Secretary of State for International Trade.

=== Phase two ===
Phase two of the development included three more ship-to-shore (STS) cranes and an additional ten gantry cranes. After being completed, the site is served by 8 Megamax cranes and 22 cantilever rail-mounted gantry (CRMG) cranes. This allows a capacity of 1m TEU per year for the site. Peel Ports announced in July 2017 that it was proceeding with the expansion and that planning work had started to bring the remaining three Megamax and ten CRMG cranes to the port. The work also involved the installation of additional reefer points to allow the port to handle a greater quantity of refrigerated containers. Peel announced in September 2019 that the new STS cranes were expected to arrive in November 2019 with all of the work being completed in summer 2021.

An upgrade to the Canada Dock Branch rail line was announced in May 2016 that would allow up to 48 trains a day to visit the port. Upgrade of the line was expected to be complete by 2019.

== Operation ==
The terminal extension is able to accommodate two 13,500 TEU New-Panamax vessels simultaneously, the maximum size that can transit the Panama Canal. As of 2016, the site is served by five Megamax cranes and twelve cantilever rail-mounted gantry cranes, completing phase one of the development. On opening, the gantry cranes were remotely operated from a logistics building 2 km (1.2 mi) away, later being operated from a control room at the terminal. The terminal has also gained the most advanced quayside to HGV automated transfer technology in Europe.

In March 2020, the terminal received its single biggest delivery to date, unloading 5,452 TEUs from MSC Federica; a record which was improved upon in December 2020, with a delivery of 5,956 TEUs by MSC Tamara. In October 2020, OOCL made Liverpool2 one of the permanent calling points for its trade between Europe and Canada. Two months later, Maersk and MSC chose to change from using the Port of Felixstowe for their TA2 transatlantic shipping service, in favour of Liverpool2. Around the same time, MSC launched a partnership with GB Railfreight to operate a five-days-a-week rail service between Liverpool2 and the East Midlands.

== Future ==
Consideration has also been given for improved road access to the terminal, from the M57 motorway junction at Switch Island, in order to ease the expected HGV congestion.

== Gallery ==
Liverpool2

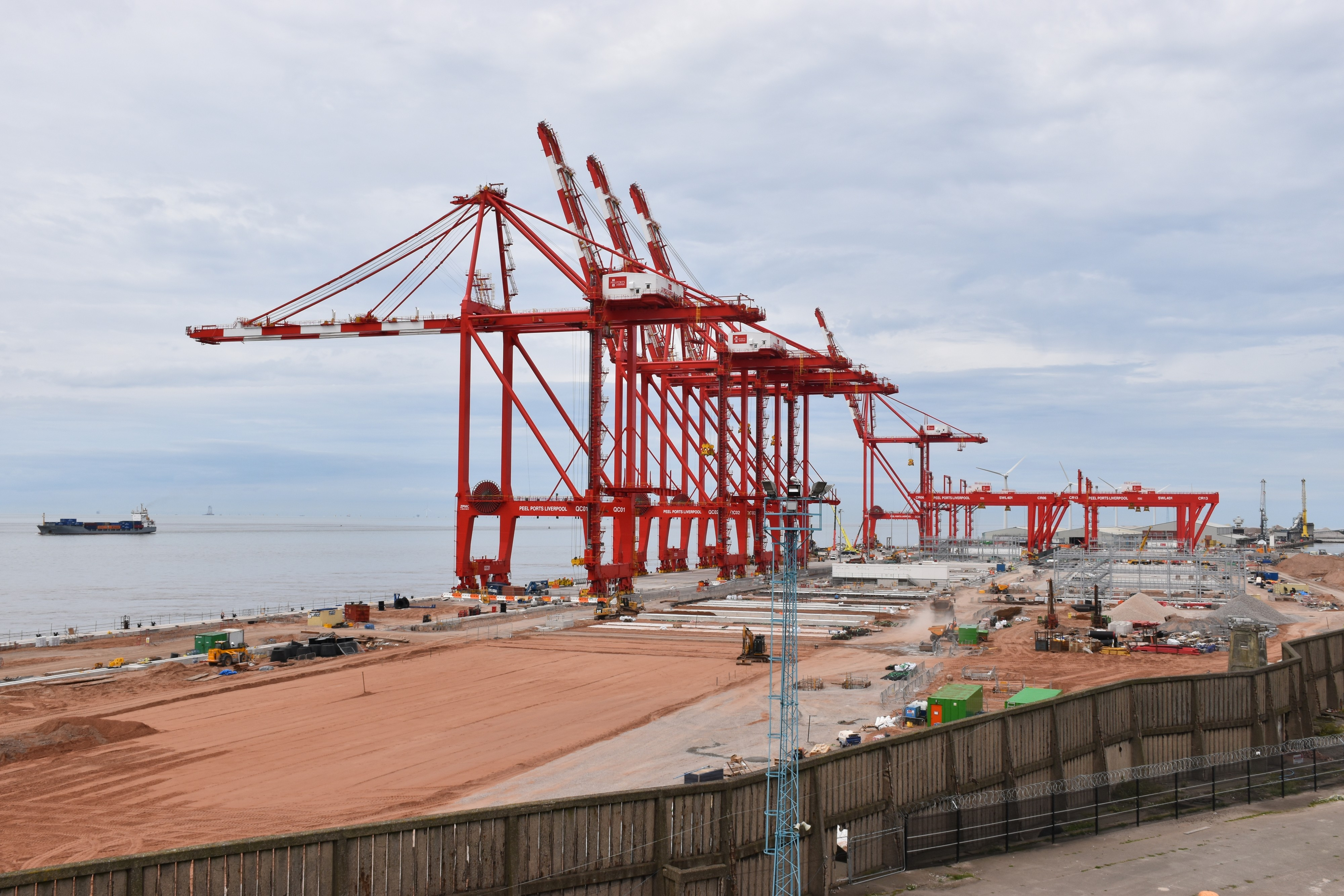
Liverpool2 under construction, July 2016

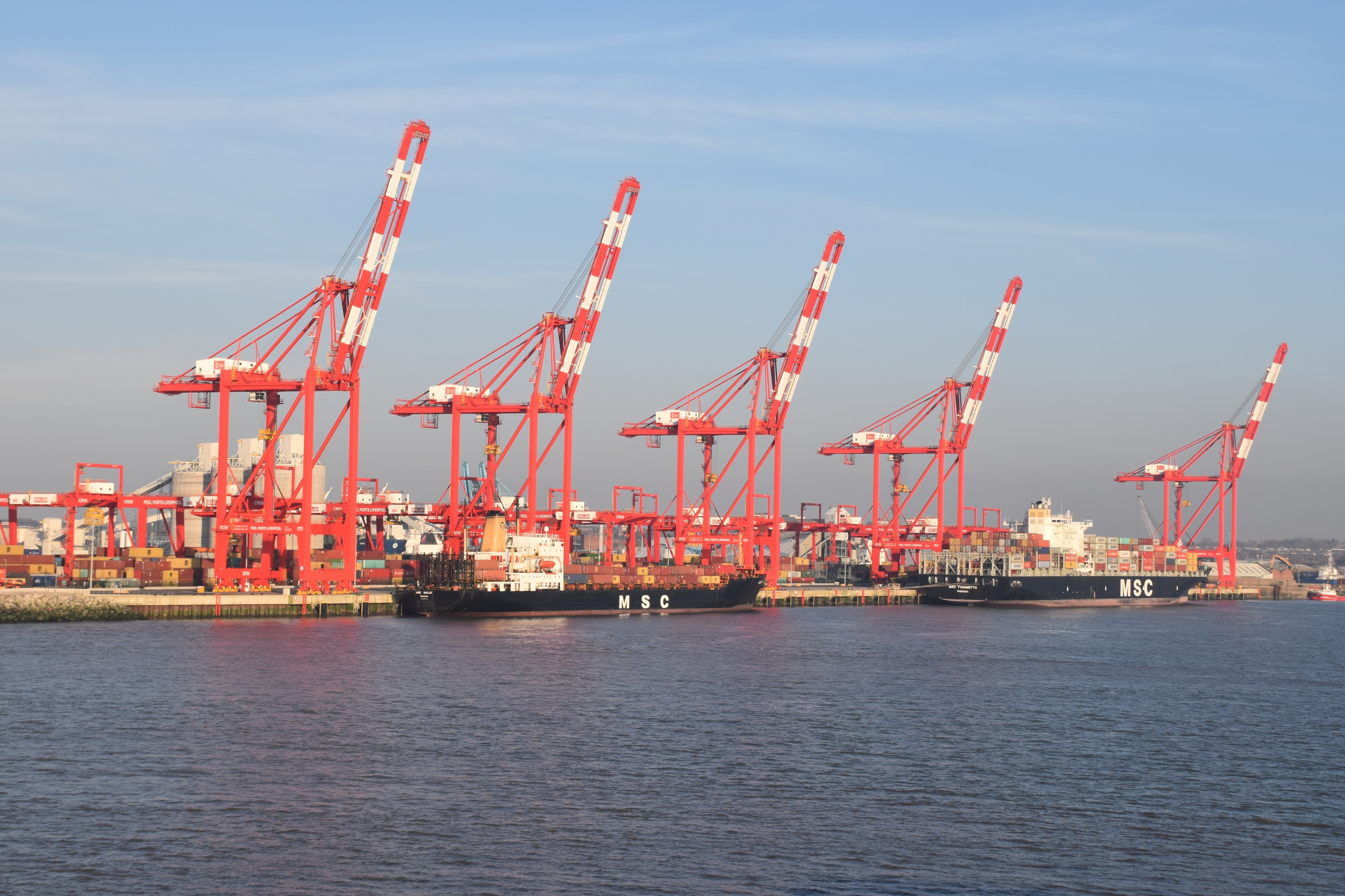
The container terminal seen from the River Mersey

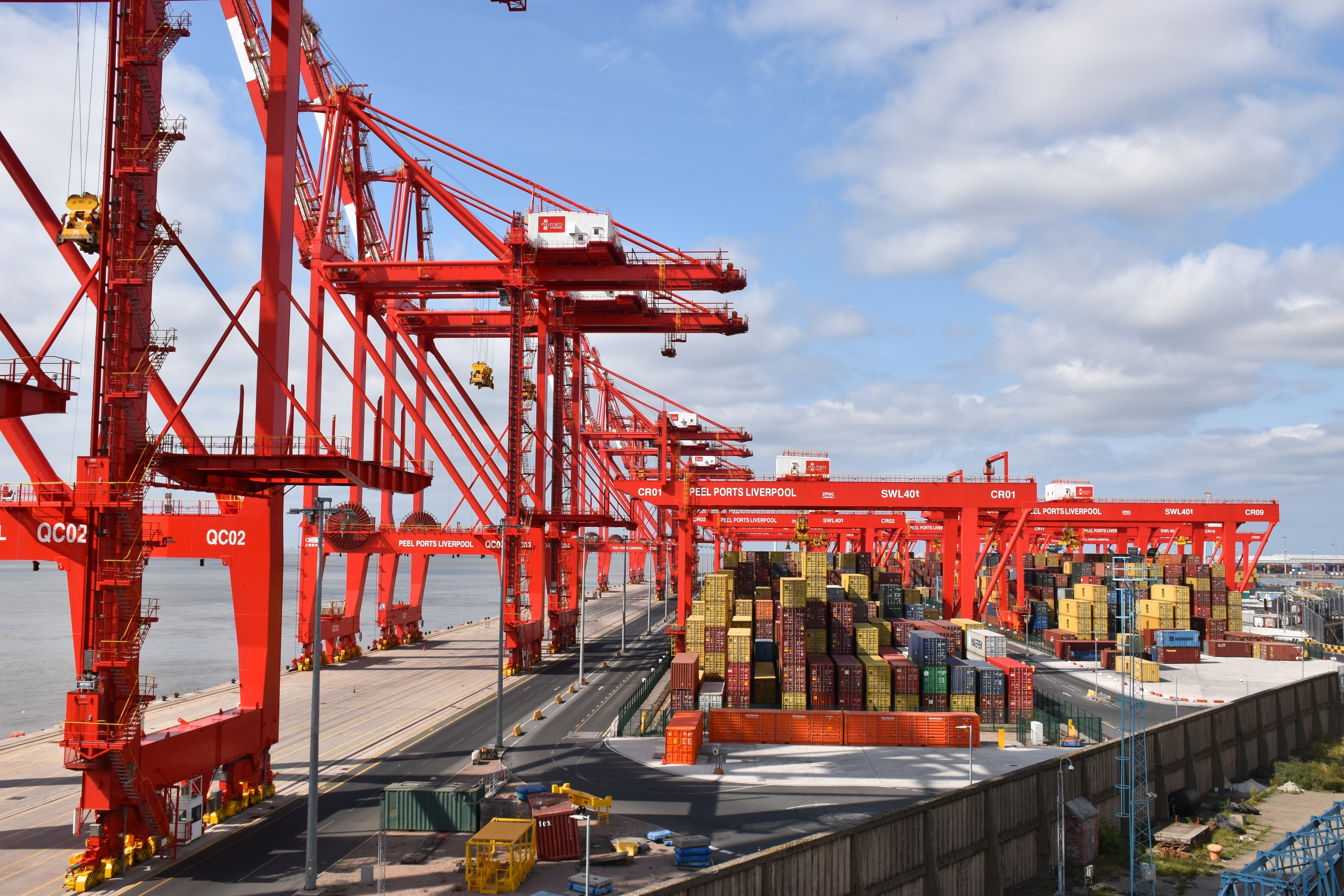
Liverpool2 in operation, August 2021

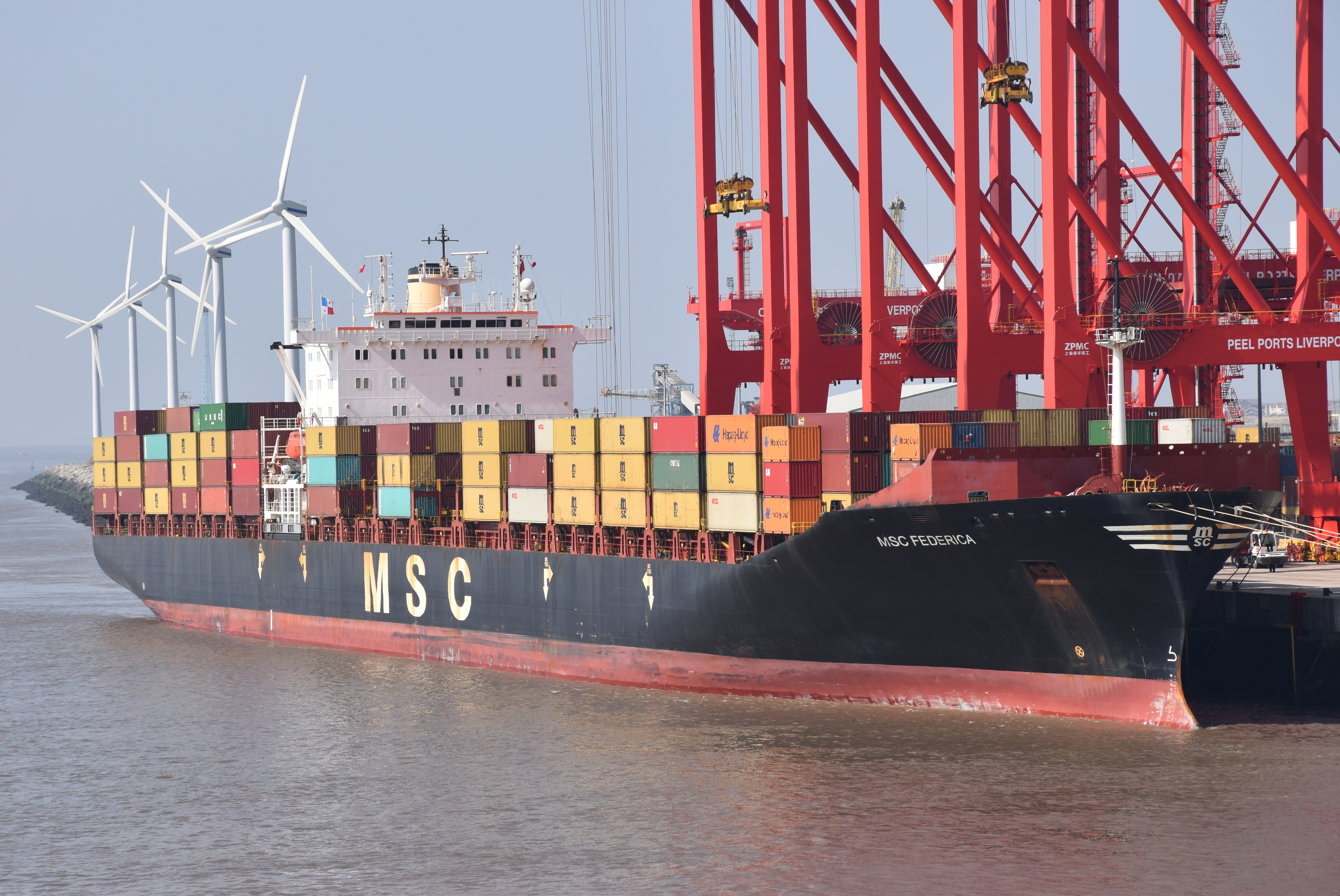
MSC Federica at Liverpool2 in 2019

== See also ==
- Port of Southampton container terminal
