= Stanley railway station (Liverpool) =

Former railway station in England

Stanley

General information
- Location: Fairfield, Liverpool; England
- Coordinates: 53.4146°N 2.9299°W
- Grid reference: SJ382913
- Line: Canada Dock Branch
- Platforms: 2

Other information
- Status: Disused

History
- Original company: London & North Western Railway
- Pre-grouping: London & North Western Railway
- Post-grouping: London Midland and Scottish Railway

Key dates
- 1 July 1870: Opened
- 31 May 1948: Closed
Location

Stanley railway station was located in Newsham Park to the north of Prescot Road on the Canada Dock Branch, Fairfield, Liverpool, England. It opened on 1 July 1870 and closed to passengers on 31 May 1948.

Preceding station	Disused railways	Following station
Tue Brook; Line and station closed	London and North Western Railway; Canada Dock Branch	Edge Lane; Line and station closed
