= Alexandra Dock railway station =

Disused railway station in Bootle, Sefton

Alexandra Dock
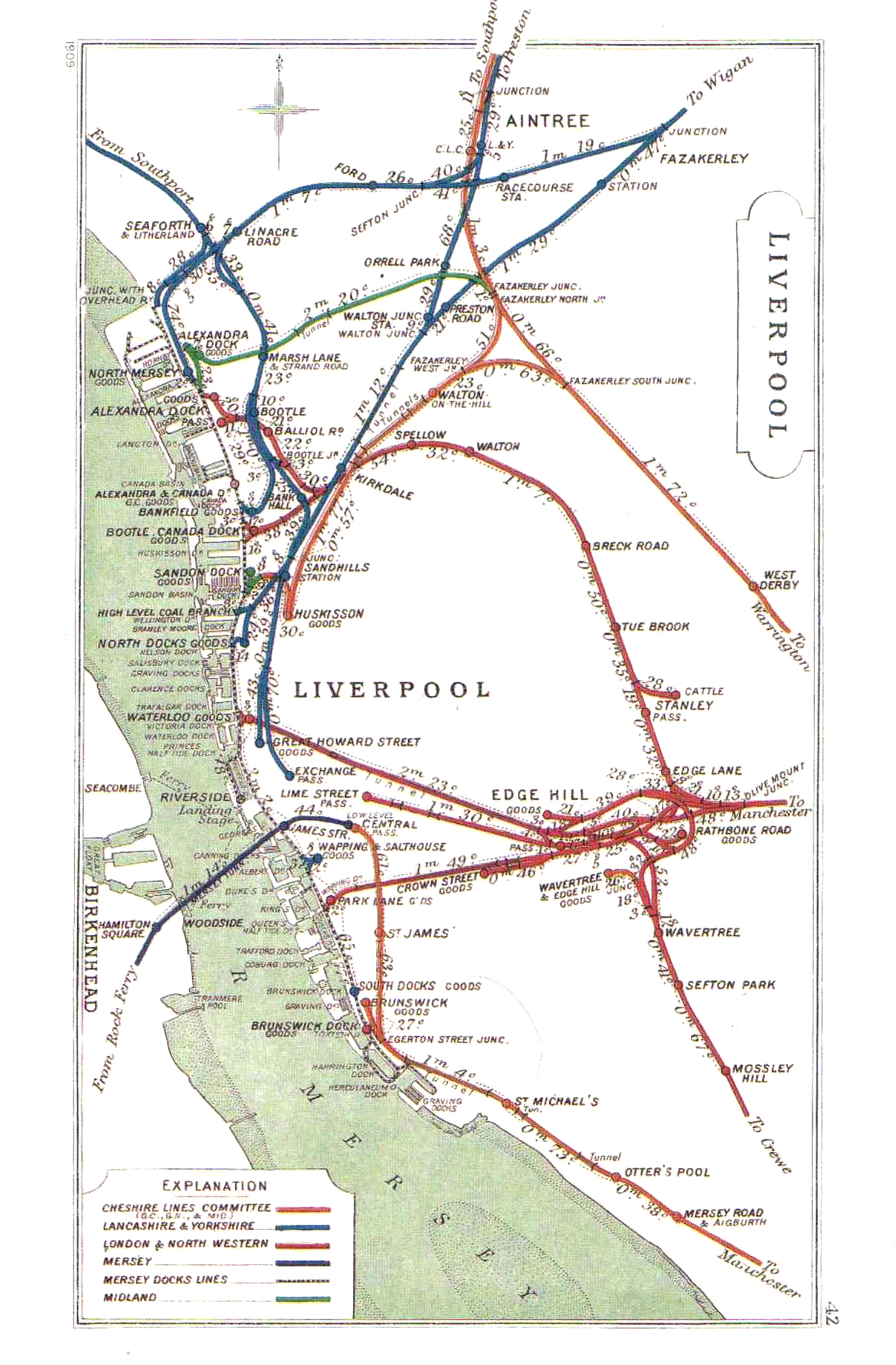

General information
- Location: Bootle, Sefton; England
- Coordinates: 53.4459°N 3.0027°W
- Grid reference: SJ335948
- Platforms: 1

Other information
- Status: Disused

History
- Original company: London and North Western Railway
- Pre-grouping: London and North Western Railway
- Post-grouping: London Midland and Scottish Railway

Key dates
- 5 September 1881: Opened as Atlantic Dock
- 10 September 1881: Renamed Alexandra Dock
- 31 May 1948: Last passenger train
- 26 February 1949: Official closure
Location

Alexandra Dock railway station was located on the Alexandra Dock Branch, in Liverpool, England. The station served Alexandra Dock until the last train on 31 May 1948. Formal closure followed on 26 February 1949.

== History ==
Opened by the London and North Western Railway, it became part of the London, Midland and Scottish Railway during the Grouping of 1923, passing on to the London Midland Region of British Railways on nationalisation in 1948. It was closed by the British Railways. As was common practice in the 1950s the station was left intact, sufficiently so for enthusiast's specials to call in 1959 and 1964. By 1971 the station had been demolished and its tracks lifted.

== The site today ==
The buildings and terminating tracks have been obliterated by modern development, but the track past the station site still serves Seaforth Dock; there is a loop a short distance northeast of the station site.

Preceding station	Disused railways	Following station
Terminus	London and North Western Railway; Alexandra Dock Branch	Bootle Balliol Road; Line and station closed
