= Canada Dock Branch =

Railway line in Liverpool, England

Canada Dock branch
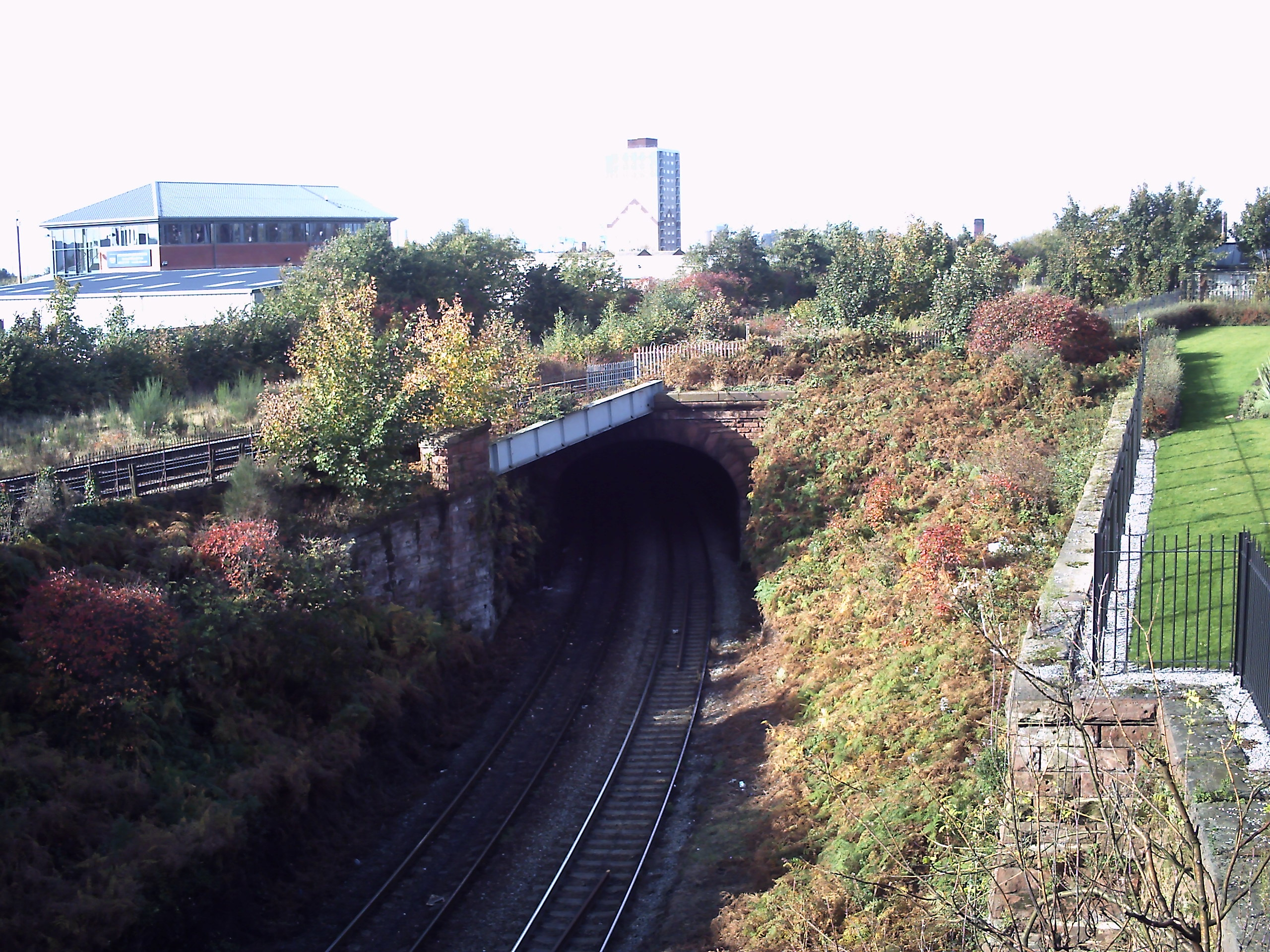
- The Canada Dock branch passes beneath the Merseyrail Northern Line near Balliol Road, entering the dock complex.

Overview
- Status: Operational
- Owner: Network Rail
- Locale: United Kingdom (Liverpool; North West England)
- Stations: 0

History
- Opened: 1866

Technical
- Line length: 4 mile 59 chain (7.62 kilometre)
- Number of tracks: Double track throughout
- Track gauge: 4 ft 8 1/2 in (1,435 mm) standard gauge
- Loading gauge: W10

The Canada Dock Branch is a 4-mile 59 chain (7.62 kilometre) long railway line in Liverpool, England. The line's route is from the large Edge Hill rail junction in the east of Liverpool to Seaforth Dock to the north. The line was originally built by the London and North Western Railway terminating at Canada Dock, with a later branch extension added to Alexandra Dock and links onto the MDHC railway lines. The line is not electrified.

== History ==
The line opened in 1866 between Edge Hill and Canada Dock. Passenger trains ran on the line to Canada Dock from 1870. The initial stations were: Canada Dock, Walton & Anfield, Breck Road, Tue Brook, Stanley and Edge Lane. On 5 September 1881 a sub-branch to Alexandra Dock was opened from the main branch at Atlantic Junction. The branch was in a cutting to the south west of Kirkdale Station. This added the Alexandra Dock and Bootle Balliol Road stations to the line. A further station as added in 1882 at County Road named Spellow. On 1 May 1886 a junction with the Liverpool, Crosby and Southport Railway was opened from the Alexandra Branch.

By 31 May 1948 all the passenger stations on the line closed. The line continued to be used by regular Southport to Liverpool Lime Street services, which operated primarily to provide a convenient Southport connection to long haul mainline trains. The service was withdrawn in October 1977. A new Merseyrail underground station below the mainline Lime Street station gave access from Southport via the Merseyrail Northern Line and Wirral Line.

A planned extension to Hornby and Gladstone Docks was abandoned in September 1973, however the extension was built and opened in September 1985 for the transport of grain and coal.

During 2021, work took place to double the 400 metres of single line section of the track, allowing trains greater flexibility to enter and exit the mainline.

== Today ==
The line is currently a freight-only diesel-traction line and is sometimes referred to as the Bootle Branch or Seaforth Container Terminal Branch (SCT) providing the sole remaining rail connection to the Port of Liverpool.

The Olive Mount chord at Edge Hill junction was re-opened in December 2008, approximately doubling the Canada Dock branch's throughput of freight from the Port of Liverpool to the West Coast Main Line. The reinstatement of the chord was essential for existing port operations, ready for the increase in freight when the Post-Panamax, Liverpool2 container terminal was completed at Seaforth Dock. The container terminal can berth the world's largest container ships, transporting up to 14,000 containers per ship.

Biomass wood pellets are imported into Liverpool and delivered to the Drax power station in Yorkshire via the rail link. The service started in 2015 with four trains a day, each carrying 25 wagons containing approximately 1,600 tonnes (1,800 tons) of biomass pellets.

A thrice-weekly rail link between the Port of Liverpool and the Mossend EuroTerminal terminal in Glasgow was set up in 2018. It is expected that each trip will consist of about 40 containers.

== The future ==
=== Passenger use ===
The Department for Transport's Rail electrification document of July 2009, states that the route to Liverpool Docks will be electrified. The Canada Dock Branch Line is the only line into the docks. From the document:

70. Electrification of this route will offer electric haulage options for freight.
There will be an alternative route to Liverpool docks for electrically-operated freight trains, and better opportunities of electrified access to the proposed freight terminal at Parkside near Newton-le-Willows.

The electrification of this branch line would greatly assist in recommissioning passenger trains, as costs would be reduced.

The Route Utilisation Strategy document makes note of the benefits of dual-voltage Electric multiple unit trains, which can be utilised on both the third rail Merseyrail network and future electrified lines which are likely to use overhead wires.

There is also a serious suggestion to introduce passenger services on this line in the Local Transport Plan for Merseyside. This was again mentioned in Merseytravel's 30-year plan of 2014. The October 2017 Liverpool City Region Combined Authority update to the Long Term Rail Strategy mentions the re-opening of the line to passenger use with new stations at Anfield, Tue Brook and Edge Lane.

The expansion of Liverpool FC's Anfield stadium has led to repeated calls to open the line to passengers and the building of a station to serve the stadium and the Anfield area. It was announced in December 2019 that Liverpool City Council had commissioned a feasibility study to see about reopening the Canada Dock Branch to passenger traffic.

=== Expansion ===
Peel Ports announced plans to expand the railhead at the port in January 2023. Aimed at getting more freight off the road and onto rail, the plans involve extending the railhead length from 400m to 800m to increase capacity at the facility.

Canada Dock Branch
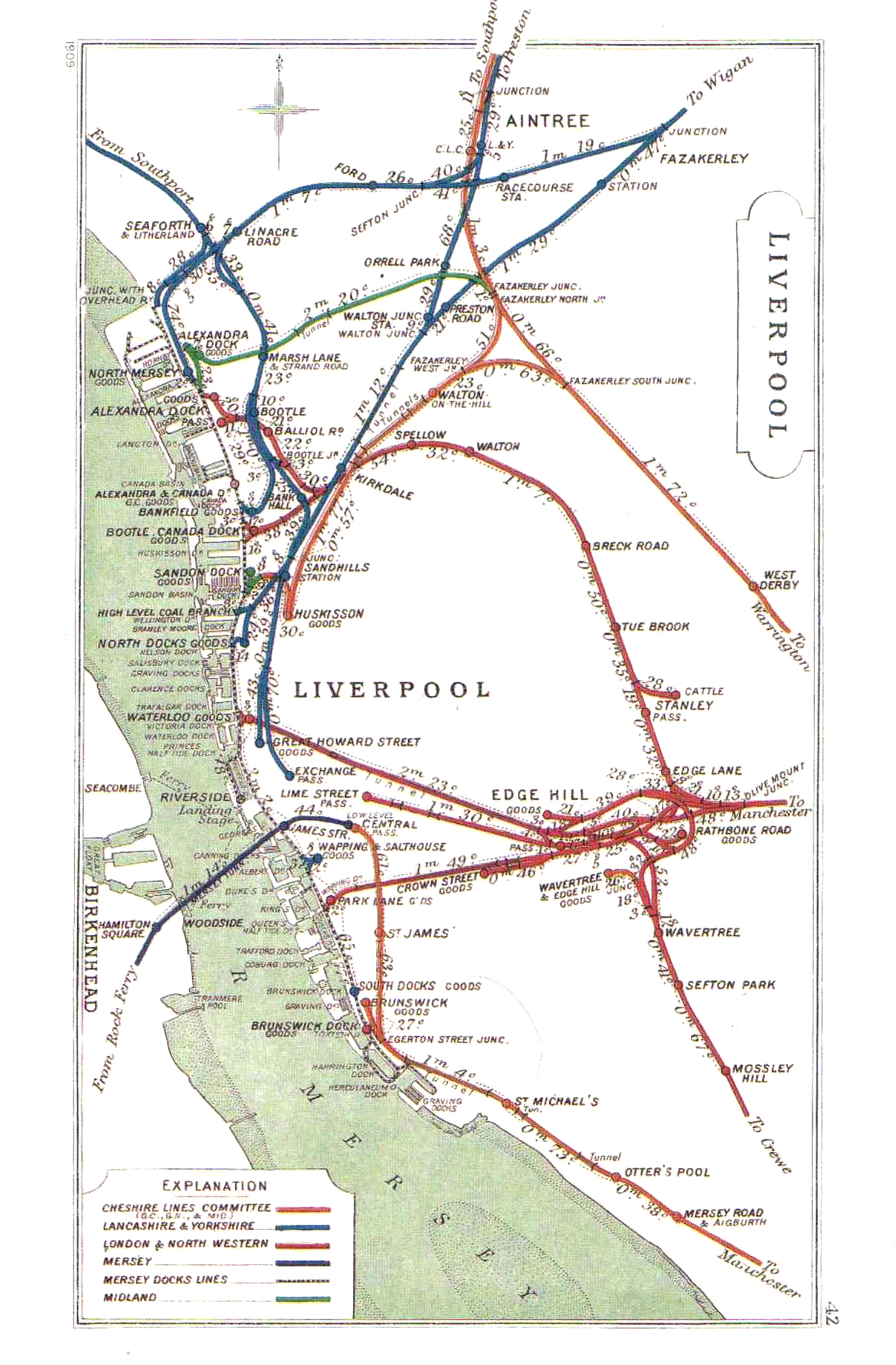
This 1909 map shows the line as the red line from Edge Hill to Canada Dock via Tuebrook. The branch after Kirkdale station is to Alexandra Dock.
