= Olive Mount chord =

Short section of railway line linking Liverpool docks to the mainline

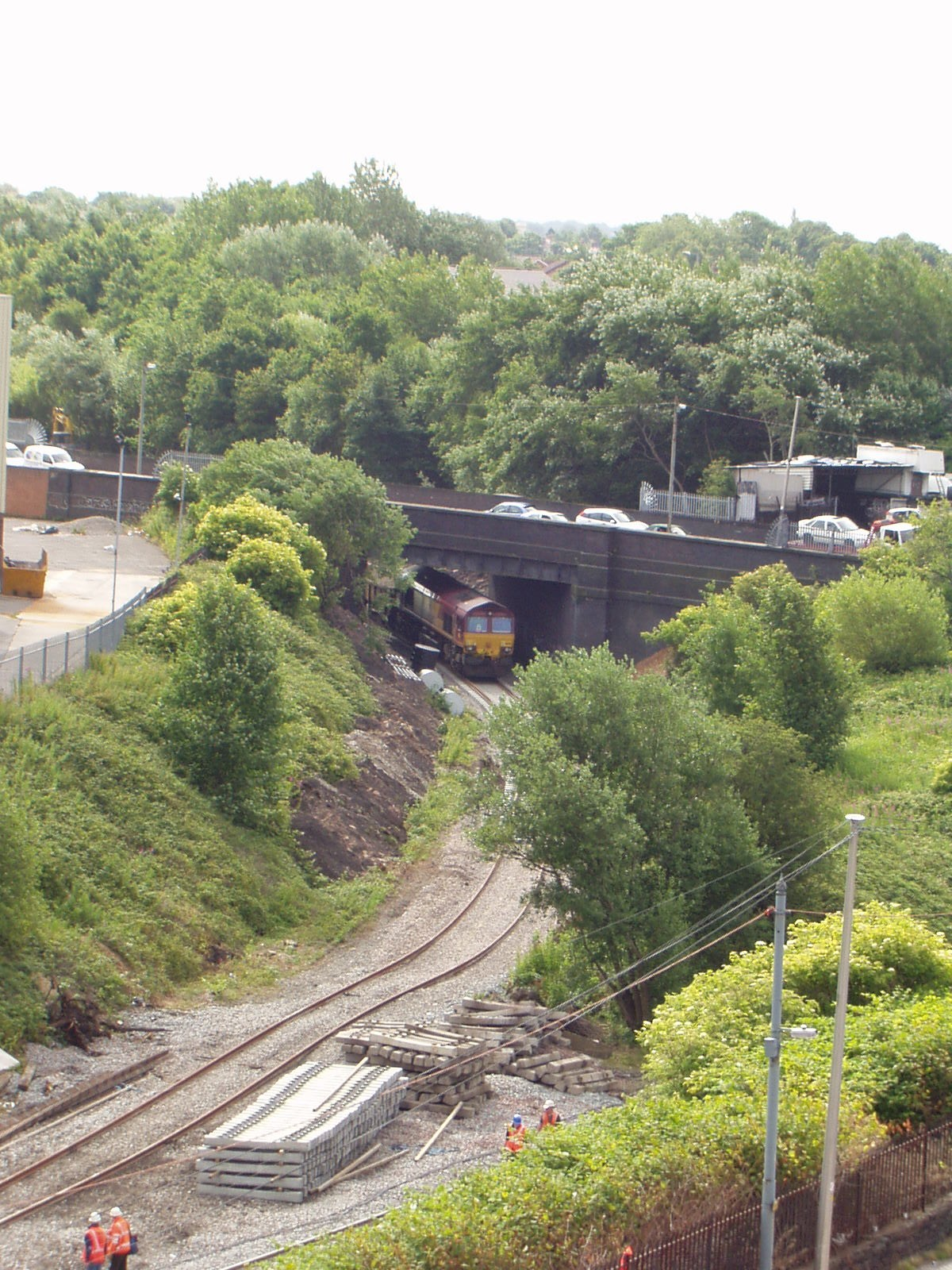
- A view of the north end of the chord, where it meets the Canada dock branch, with reconstruction work progressing

Overview
- Status: Operational
- Owner: Network Rail
- Locale: United Kingdom (Liverpool; North West England)
- Coordinates: 53.408152°N 2.926923°W
- Stations: 0

History
- Opened: 2009

Technical
- Number of tracks: Single track throughout
- Track gauge: 1,435 mm (4 ft 8 1/2 in) standard gauge
- Loading gauge: W10

The Olive Mount chord in Liverpool, England, is a 300-metre stretch of railway track between Olive Mount Junction, in Olive Mount cutting, and Edge Lane Junction that provides access to the Canada Dock Branch (more usually known today as the Bootle Branch).

== History ==
The Olive Mount Chord was built as part of the L&NWR's Canada Dock Branch railway, which opened in 1866. It was designed to ease transition between the branch and the main L&NWR line into and out of the Liverpool area. The chord was taken out of use following a fire in the signal box at Edge Lane Junction on 21 January 1987 and subsequently lifted, because the declining amount of dock traffic meant the cost of repairing the box, or altering the signalling to allow remote operation from Edge Hill PSB, was not seen to be justified. However, delays resulting from the removal of the chord limited access to the Port of Liverpool.

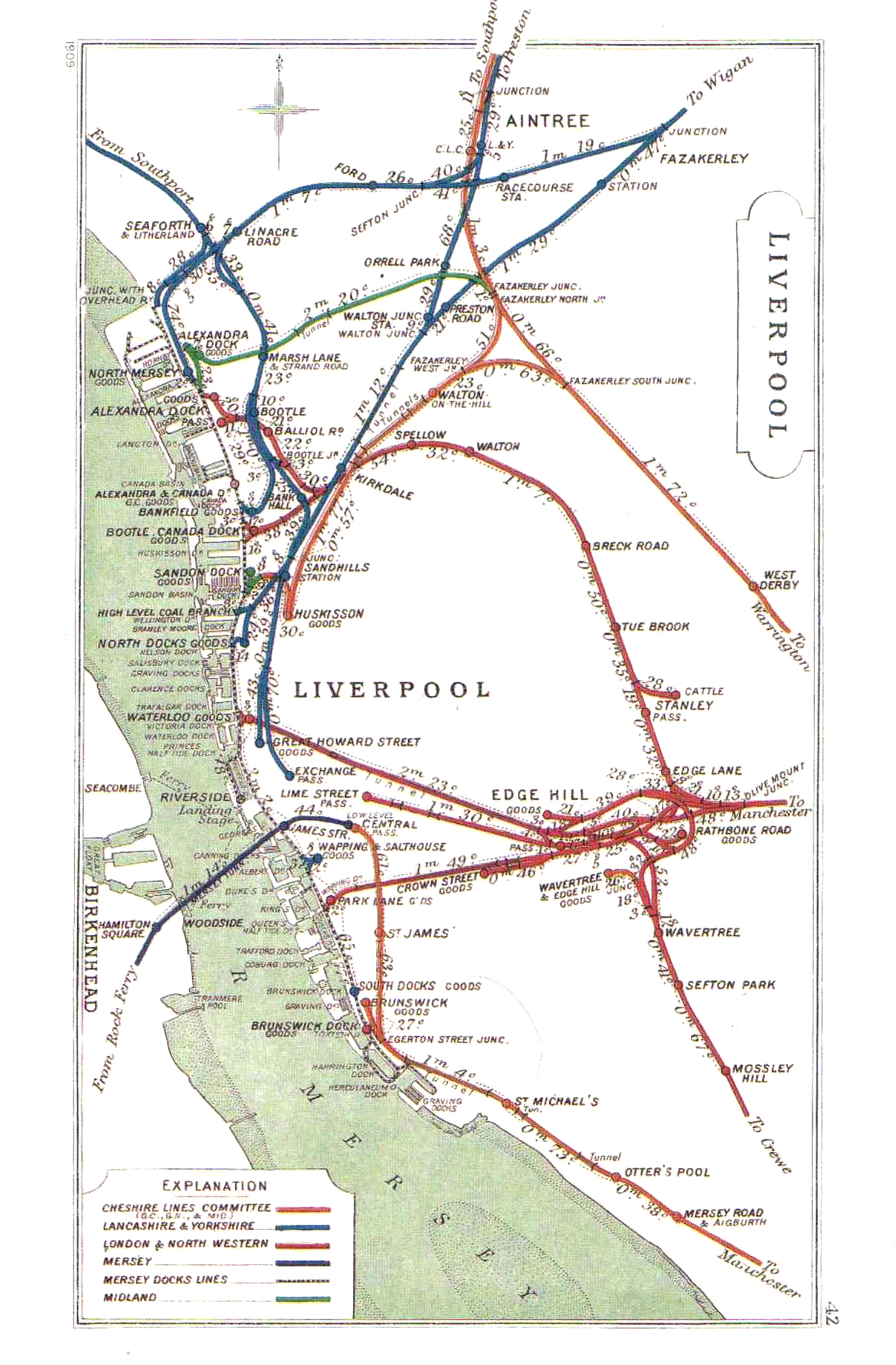
A 1909 map showing some of the lines to be reused

== Reinstatement ==
On 27 June 2006, Douglas Alexander, Secretary of State for Transport, revealed that the Olive Mount Chord was one of several projects to be included in the government's productivity transport innovation fund.

On 20 January 2008, the green light was given to reopen the line to make the ferrying of freight between the Port of Liverpool to the West Coast Main Line easier. The works removed the need for reversing at Edge Hill and for crossing the lines in and out of Lime Street.

Over the Bank Holiday weekend of early May 2008, the Chat Moss line was closed to rail traffic to allow a facing crossover to be installed between the inbound (to Liverpool) and outbound (to Manchester) lines. This crossing was placed on site on Sunday 4 May 2008 and is located east of Mill Lane bridge. The work on this weekend involved the use of a Kirow rail mounted crane.

A further step change took place on Sunday 13 July 2008 when the Balfour Beatty New Track Construction machine was in use on the chord. It laid a single track from Olive Mount Junction on the Chat Moss line through the Olive Mount Tunnel up to the Bootle Branch at Edge Lane Junction. There was already a crossover and turnout on the Bootle Branch but no physical connection was made at that stage.

The project became operational from the Winter 2008 timetable, starting on Sunday 14 December 2008. It cost an estimated £7.9m, of which Merseytravel contributed £2.1m.

The chord was officially reopened on 6 March 2009.
