= Mersey Docks and Harbour Company =

Administrative body of the Port of Liverpool

Coordinates: 53°28′1″N 3°1′12.5″W

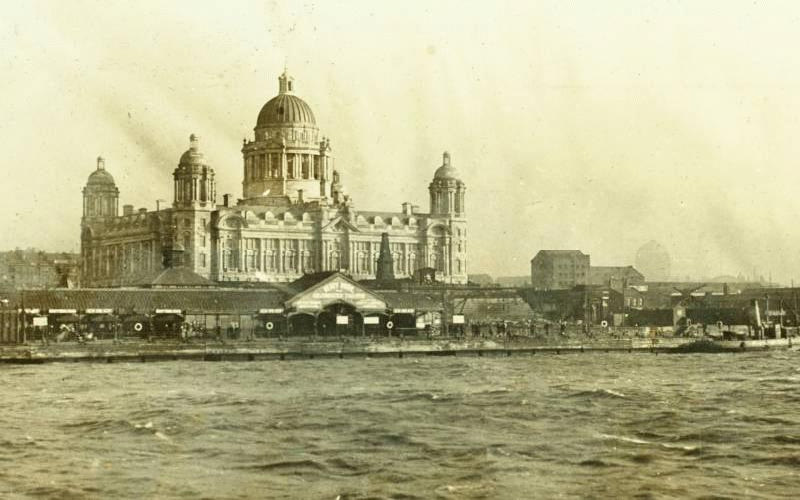
- The Port of Liverpool Building, former headquarters of the company
- Type: Subsidiary
- Industry: Port operations, maritime logistics
- Predecessor: Liverpool Dock Trustees; Mersey Docks and Harbour Board
- Founded: 1857 (as Mersey Docks and Harbour Board)
- Founder: Created via the Mersey Docks and Harbour Act 1857
- Fate: Reconstituted as a company in 1972; acquired by Peel Ports in 2005
- Headquarters: Maritime Centre, Port of Liverpool, United Kingdom
- Area served: River Mersey (Liverpool & Wirral Peninsula), River Medway
- Products: Port facilities, cargo handling, marine solutions
- Services: Container port services, harbor management, vessel bunkering
- Owner: Peel Ports (The Peel Group)
- Website: www.peelports.com

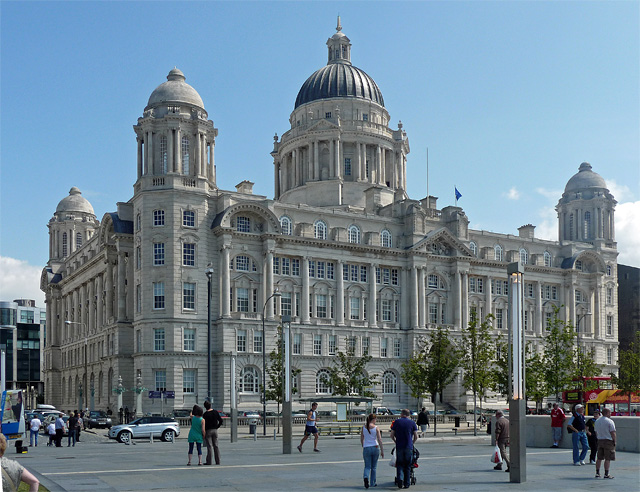
The Port of Liverpool Building at the Pier Head. Former offices of the Mersey Docks and Harbour Company.

The Mersey Docks and Harbour Company (MDHC), formerly the Mersey Docks and Harbour Board (MDHB), owns and administers the dock facilities of the Port of Liverpool, on the River Mersey, England. These include the operation of the enclosed northern dock system that runs from Prince's Dock to Seaforth Dock, in the city of Liverpool and the dock facilities built around the Great Float of the Wirral Peninsula, located on the west side of the river.

Peel Ports, the MDHC's parent company, owns other maritime facilities in the area, including the Cammell Laird shipyard, Tranmere Oil Terminal and the Manchester Ship Canal.

== History ==
House flag

Blue Ensign

Red Ensign

Liverpool Common Council's Dock Committee was the original port authority. In 1709, it had been authorised by the Liverpool Docks Act 1709 (8 Ann. c. 8) to construct Liverpool's first enclosed ship basin, the Old Dock, which was the world's first commercial wet dock. Section 5 of the act made the Liverpool Corporation trustees of the docks.

The old Dock Committee was replaced by a separate legal body, the Liverpool Dock Trustees (formally, the Trustees of the Liverpool Docks) by the Liverpool Port and Town Improvement Act 1811 (51 Geo. 3. c. cxliii). The trustees themselves continued to be a committee of the Liverpool Common Council.

In order to provide stone for the construction of the expanded dock system, from 1830 the trustees (and later the MDHB) operated large quarries at Creetown, Scotland.

Mersey Docks and Harbour Act 1857
- Act of Parliament
- Parliament of the United Kingdom
- Long title: An Act for consolidating the Docks at Liverpool and Birhenhead into One Estate, and for vesting the Control and Management of them in One Public Trust; and for other Purposes.
- Citation: 20 & 21 Vict. c. clxii

Dates
- Royal assent: 25 August 1857

Text of statute as originally enacted

The Mersey Docks and Harbour Board was created by the Mersey Docks and Harbour Act 1857 (20 & 21 Vict. c. clxii). It took over running of Liverpool's docks from the trustees in 1858, and also took over the Birkenhead docks on the other side of the Mersey, which had become insolvent in 1847, and had been acquired by Liverpool Corporation. The need for Liverpool Corporation to divest its dock interests to a new public body was as a result of pressure from Parliament, dock merchants and some rival port operators. The new board was controlled by dock users rather than local politicians.

At one point the MDHB railway totalled 104 miles (166 km) of line, with connections to many other railways. A section of the line ran, unsegregated from other road traffic, along the dock road. Today only the Canada Dock Branch is used.

A law case arose in 1946 regarding agency law, when the board hired out a crane and driver to be used by another business, Coggins and Griffiths (Liverpool) Ltd. During operation of the crane, someone was injured. The contract for the crane hire stated that the driver "would be the servant of the hirers", but the House of Lords ruled in Mersey Docks and Harbour Board v Coggins & Griffith (Liverpool) Ltd [1946] UKHL 1 that this provision did not give the hirers control of how the driver undertook his work, and therefore the Mersey Docks and Harbour Board remained vicariously liable for the driver's negligent actions.

In 1972, the MDHB was reconstituted as a company, the Mersey Docks and Harbour Company, to allow it to raise money for new building initiatives and projects, including the new container dock at Seaforth. Four lightvessels in the approaches to the River Mersey were maintained by the MDHB until 1973.

In 1993 MDHC bought Medway Ports for £104 million, just 18 months after Medway Ports was privatised through a £37 million management buyout in 1992.

The UK Government had retained a 14% shareholding in MDHC which was sold on 30 March 1998.

The company operated a private lifeboat station, which was involved in a number of incidents over the years.

== Management ==
The MDHC was accused of "macho management" by the Financial Times regarding its treatment of some of its staff in the 1990s, which resulted in the Liverpool dockers' strike.

On 22 September 2005, the MDHC was acquired by Peel Ports, part of the property and transport group Peel Group, which owns a minority stake in Liverpool John Lennon Airport.

== Facilities ==
Cammell Laird Dock is a dock at Birkenhead, on the Wirral Peninsula. It exits directly onto the River Mersey.

The dock was built as part of an expansion of the Cammell Laird shipyard at the turn of the 20th century by enclosing what was once Tranmere Pool.

Following the closure of the original Cammell Laird shipyard in 1993, the dock and the four remaining dry docks at the site are owned by the MDHC. All were subsequently leased, firstly to the A&P Group and then to Northwestern Shiprepairers & Shipbuilders, which officially renamed itself Cammell Laird Shiprepairers and Shipbuilders Ltd on 17 November 2008.

== See also ==
- Port of Liverpool
- Associated British Ports
- Peninsular and Oriental group
- PD Ports
