= Seaforth Dock =

Dock and container terminal on the River Mersey in Liverpool, England

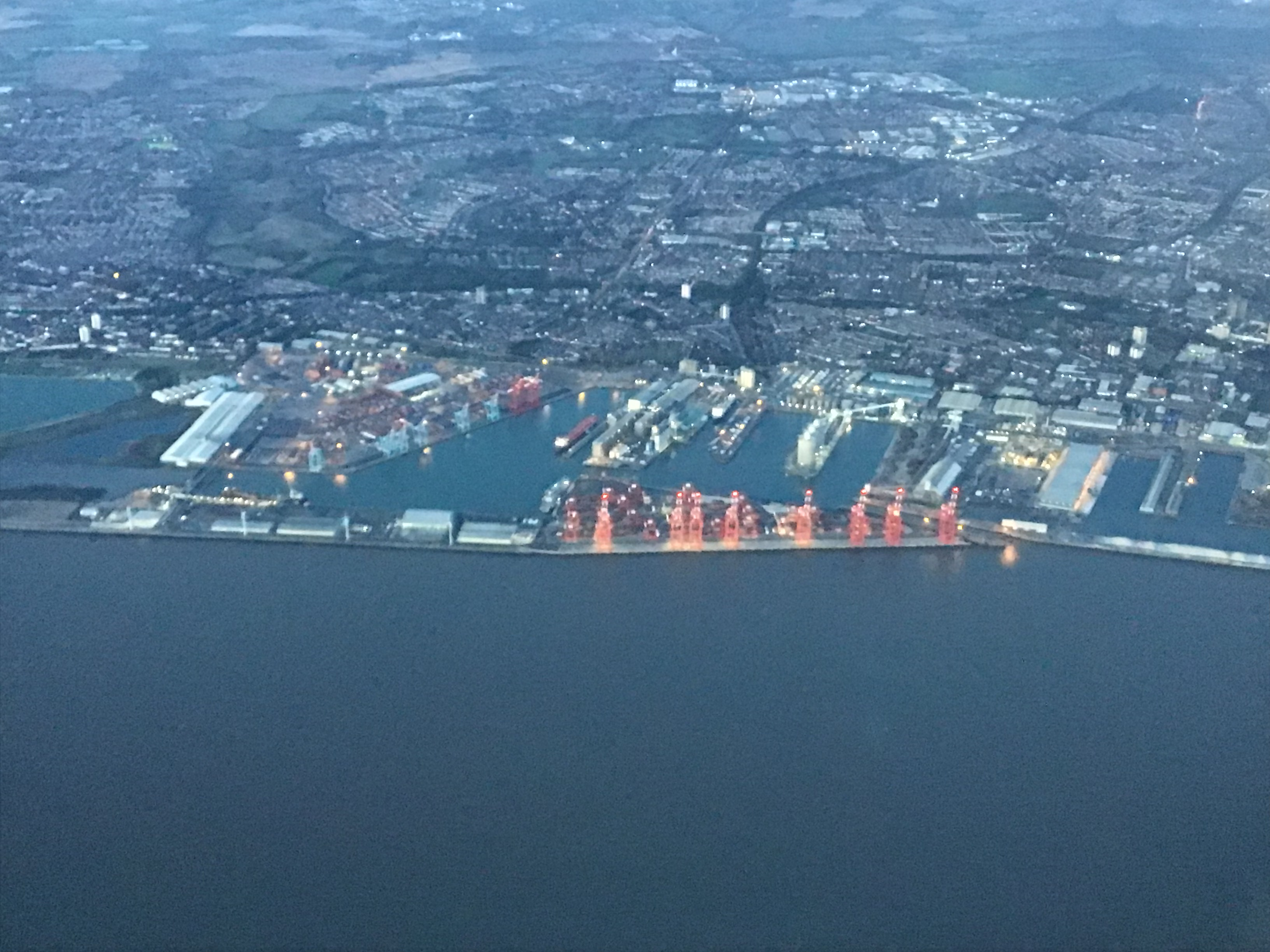
- Aerial view of Seaforth Dock

Location
- Location: Seaforth, Liverpool, United Kingdom
- Coordinates: 53.4592°N 3.0250°W
- OS grid: SJ319963

Details
- Owner: The Peel Group
- Operator: Mersey Docks and Harbour Company
- Opened: 1971; 54 years ago
- Type: Wet dock
- Purpose: Cargo transfer
- Joins: Gladstone Dock
- Entries: 1
- Gates: 1 pair
- Area: 500 acres (2.0 km^{2}) (including dockland); 85 acres (34 ha) (water)
- Width at entrance: 130 ft (40 m)
- Minimum depth: 50 ft (15 m)
- Quay length: 10,000 ft (3,000 m)
- Cranes: 6 Container cranes
- Cargo type: Container; Bulk; Reefer (former)
- Transport links: A565; A5036 (road); Canada Dock branch (rail)

Seaforth Dock (also known as the Royal Seaforth Dock) is a purpose-built dock and container terminal, on the River Mersey, England, at Seaforth, to the north of Liverpool. As part of the Port of Liverpool and Liverpool Freeport, it is operated by the Mersey Docks and Harbour Company. Situated at the northern end of the dock system, it is connected to Gladstone Dock to the south, which via its lock entrance provides maritime access to Seaforth Dock from the river.

== History ==
Despite planning permission having been obtained almost sixty years previously, work commenced during the 1960s on Liverpool's largest dock facility. In part the work was intended to reconstruct or compensate for damage suffered during World War II. The dock was the largest built in the United Kingdom for some time, with 10,000 ft (3,000 m) of quay and a depth of 50 ft (15 m) and world's largest lock gates.

Opened in 1971, the site consists of about 500 acres (2.0 km^{2}), of which 85 acres (34 ha) is water. Technological changes, such as containerization, caused the loss of numerous jobs on the docks. In the 21st century, the dock handles mainly containers, oils, timber, fruit and vegetables, grain and animal feed. The dock became a free port in 1984.

A fruit and vegetable terminal opened at the dock in 2008. The terminal primarily received produce from Spain. However, this facility closed in 2013.

== Wind turbines ==
In 1999, Peel Energy installed six Vestas V44-600 kW wind turbines along the river wall for a total nameplate capacity of 3.6MW.

== Rail connection ==
Seaforth Dock is served by one rail line, the Canada Dock branch line. The Olive Mount rail chord at Edge Hill junction was re-opened early 2009 to increase the throughput of the service to Seaforth Dock, giving direct access for freight from the Port of Liverpool to the West Coast Main Line. In May 2016 it was announced that the line's final section into the dock estate would be upgraded to double track from single track to increase capacity to the port. Combined with improved signalling at Earlestown, the improvements will enable up to 48 trains a day to enter the port. Work on the line is expected to be completed by 2019.

== Liverpool2 ==
Liverpool2 is a Post-Panamax container terminal extension which opened in November 2016 as an expansion to Seaforth dock.

== Gallery ==
Seaforth Dock (Liverpool)

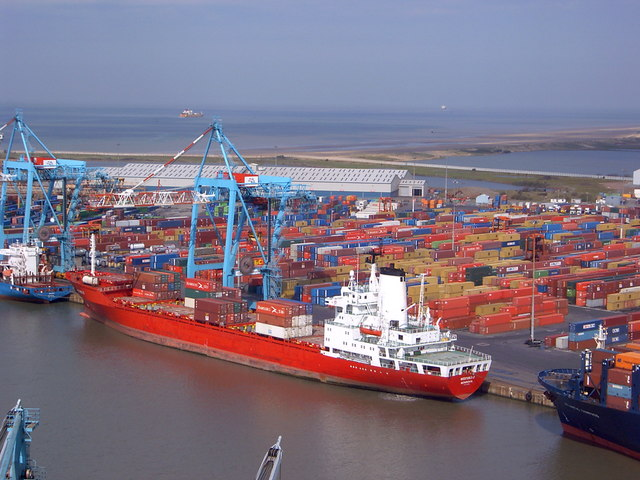
Royal Seaforth Container Terminal (2003)

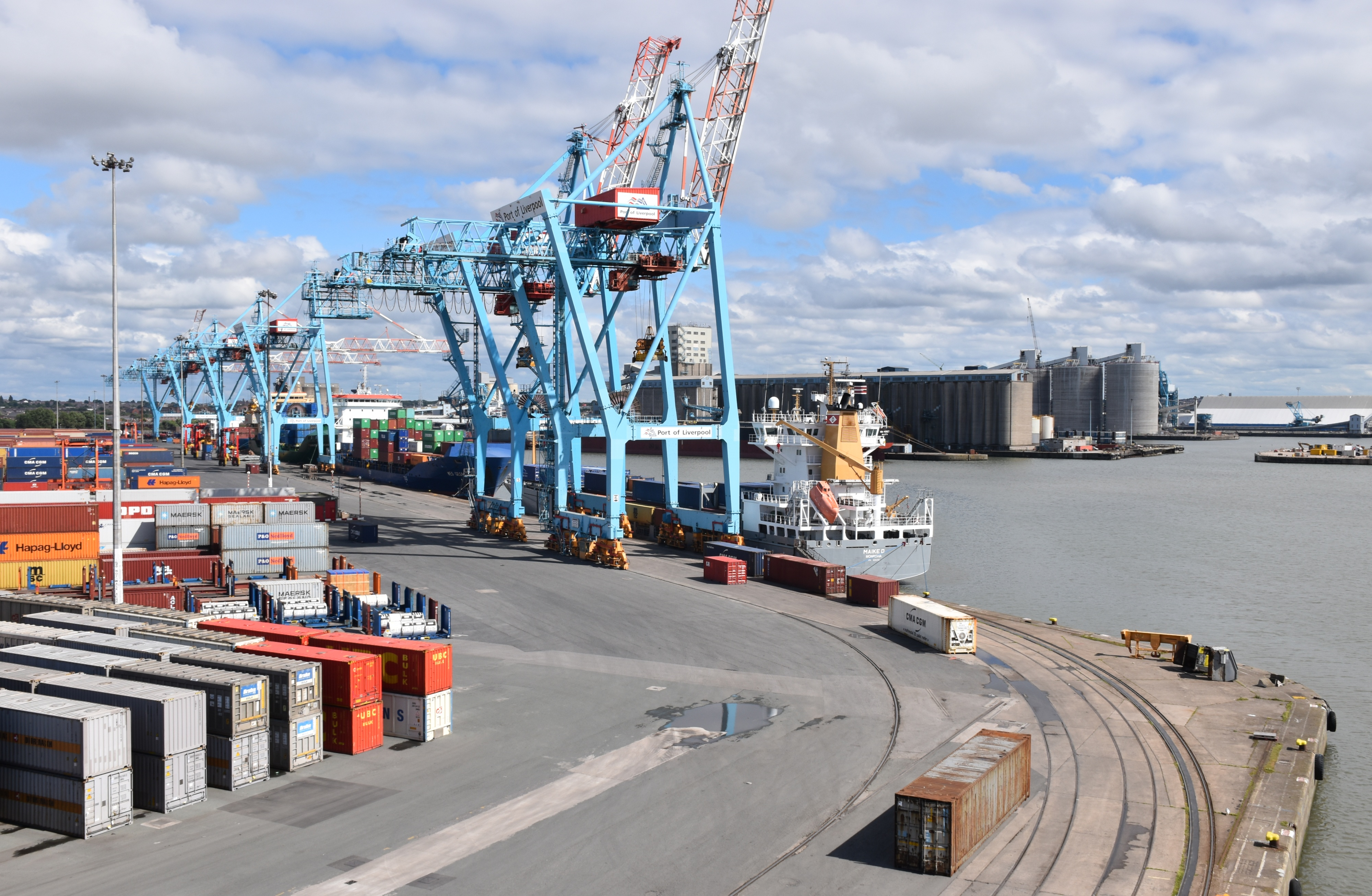
Royal Seaforth Container Terminal and Dock (2016)

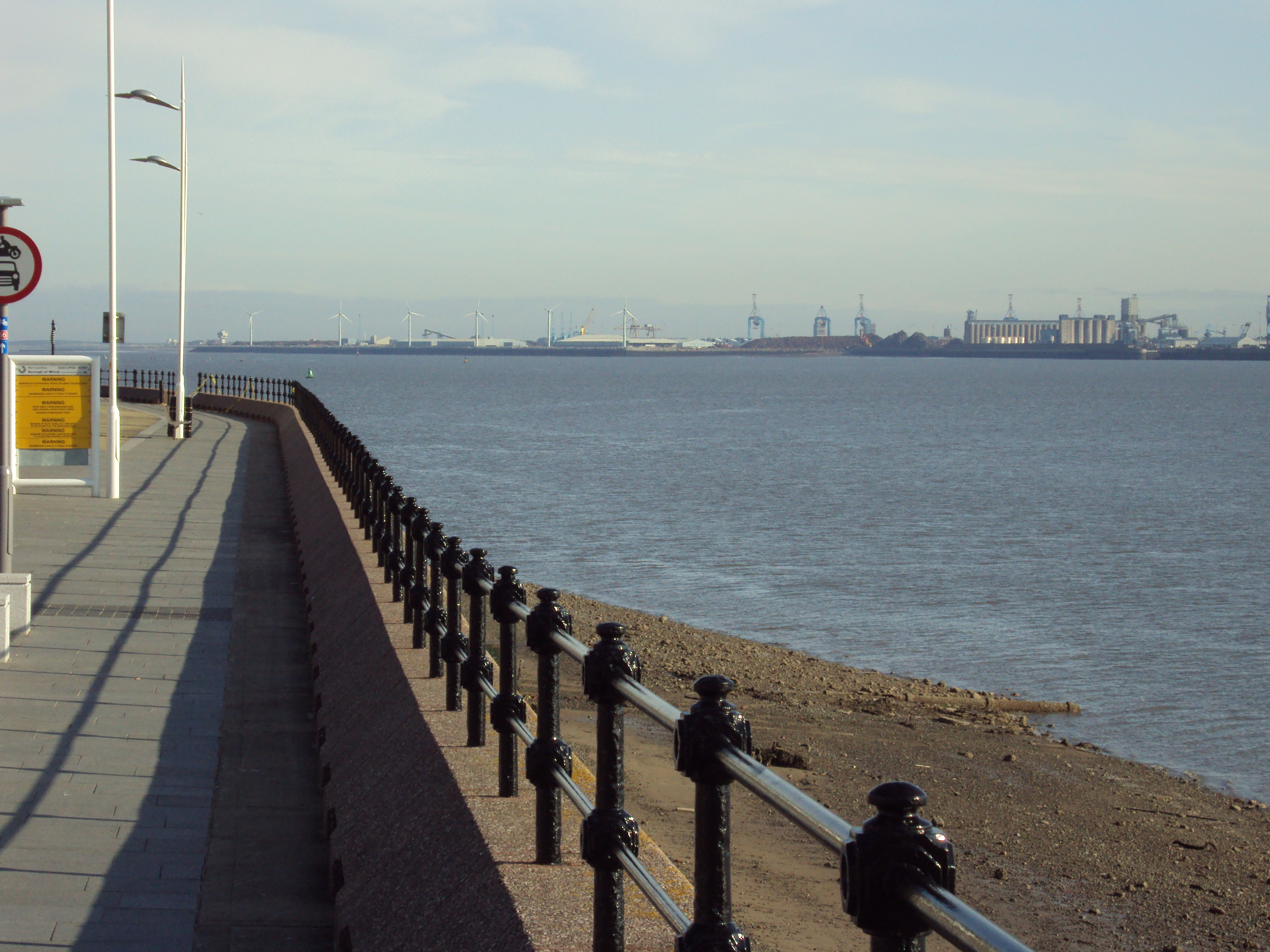
Wind turbines on the distant Seaforth Dock, seen from the Promenade at Seacombe, Wirral, England

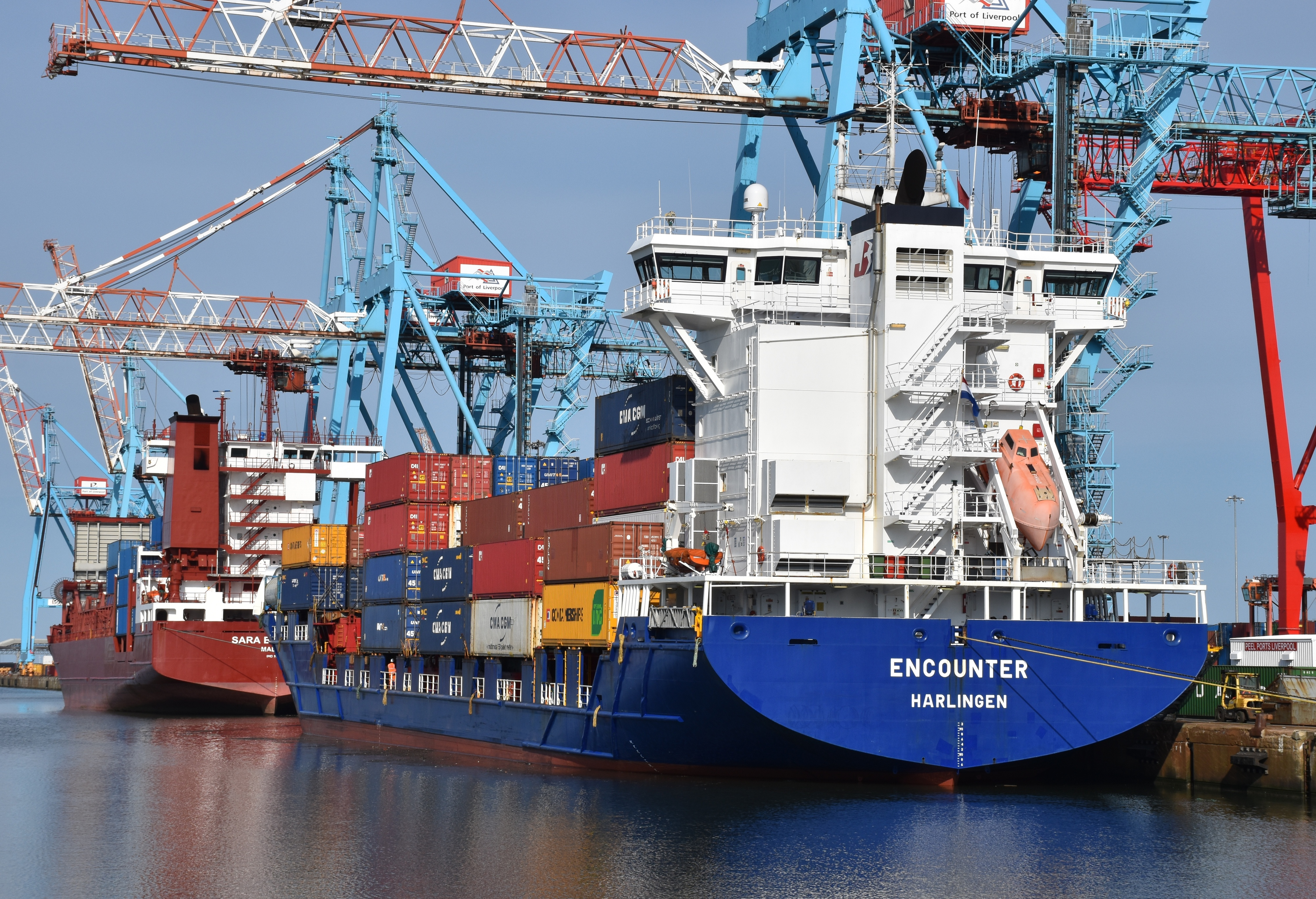
Container feeders Sara Borchard and Encounter at the Royal Seaforth Container Terminal (2021)

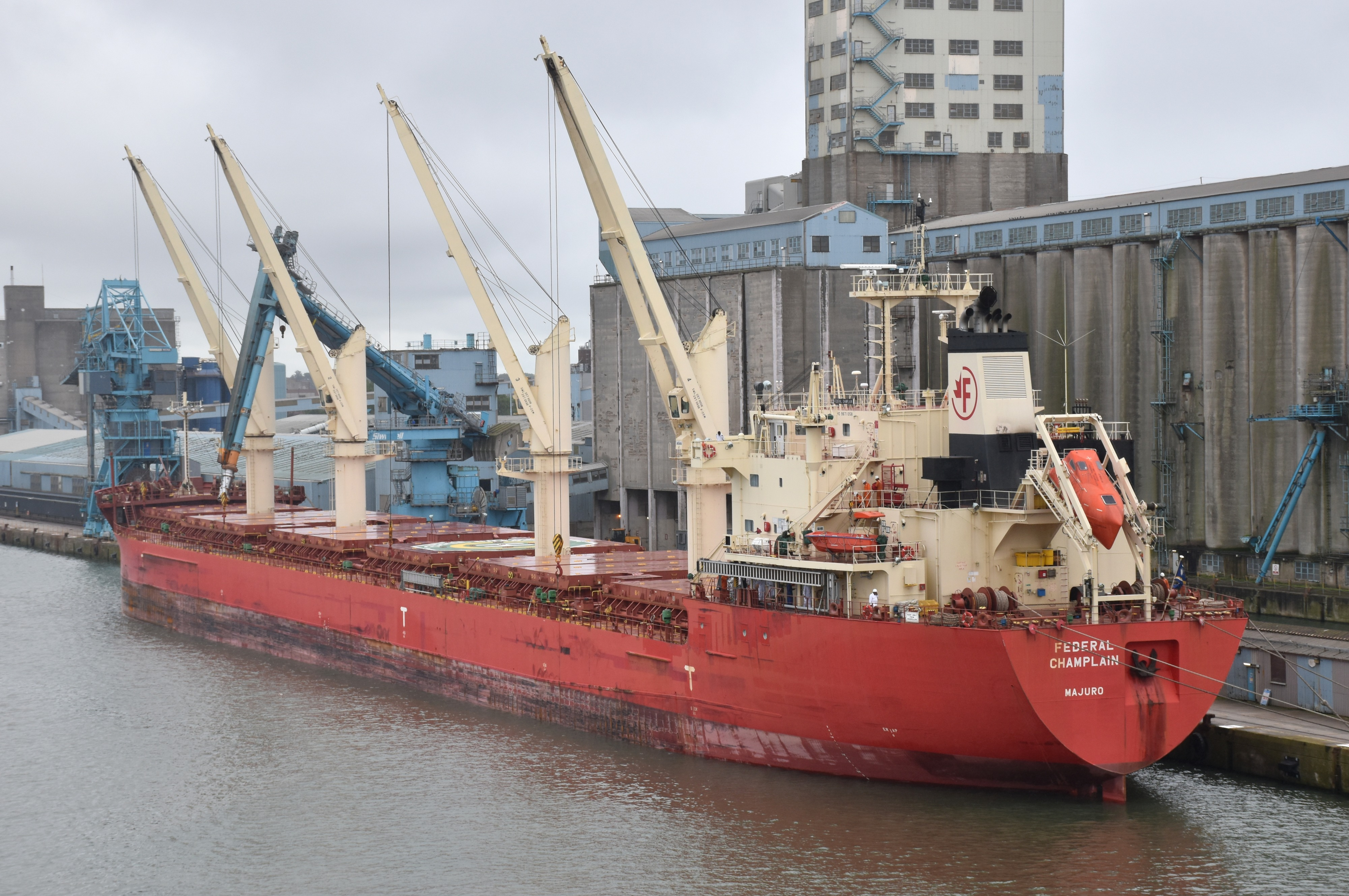
Federal Champlain discharging at the Seaforth Grain Terminal (2020)
