= Edge Hill railway station (1830) =

Former railway station in Liverpool, England

Coordinates: 53°24′06″N 2°57′0″W

Edge Hill
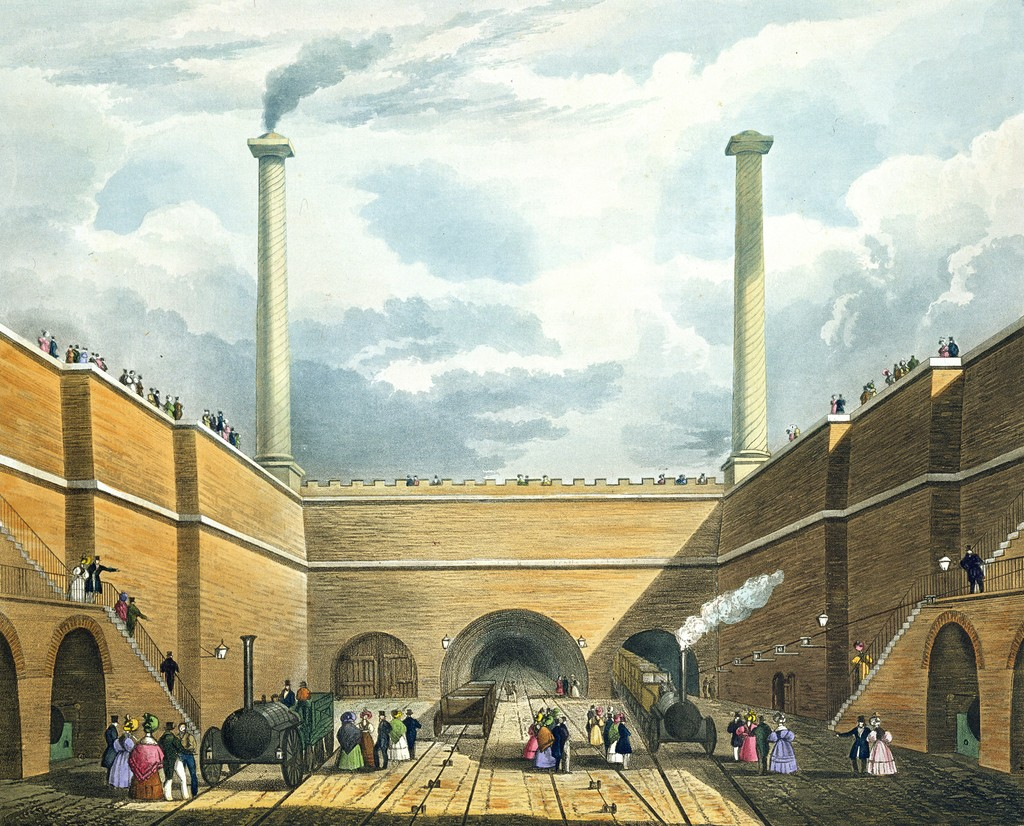
- Thomas Talbot Bury's watercolour of the tunnel portals

General information
- Location: England

Other information
- Status: Disused

History
- Original company: Liverpool and Manchester Railway

Key dates
- 15 September 1830: Opened as Liverpool
- 15 August 1836: Closed to passenger traffic

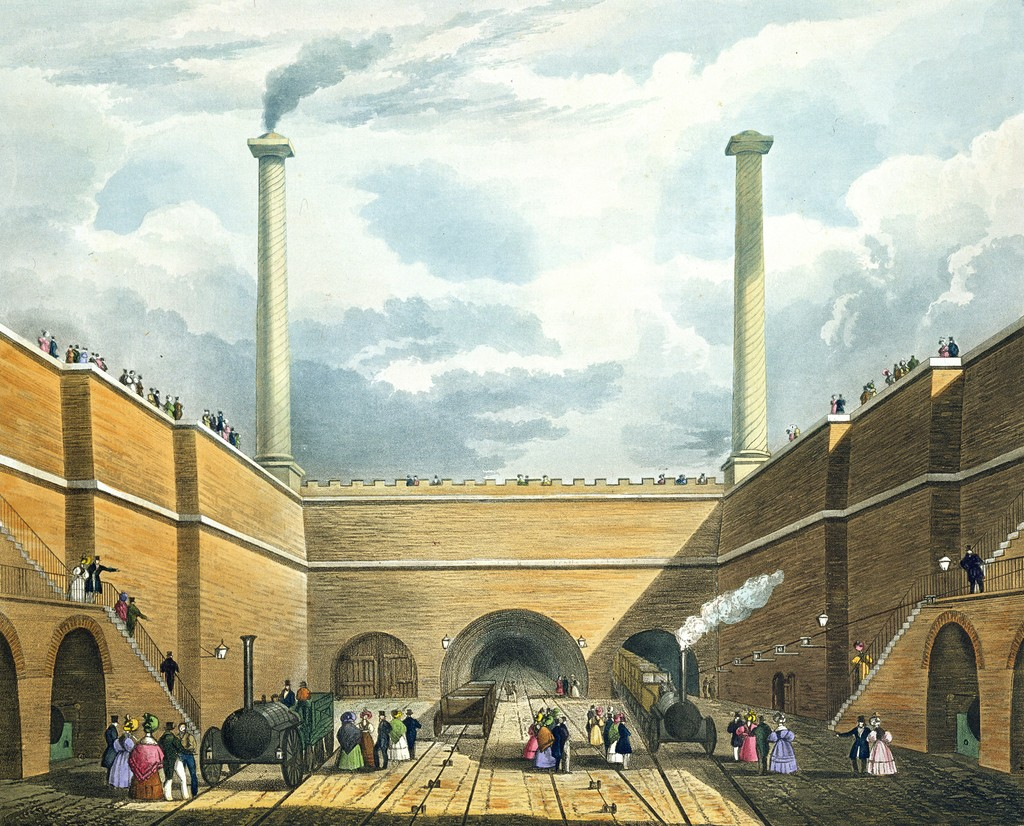
Thomas Talbot Bury's watercolour of the tunnel portals

Edge Hill railway station was a railway station that served the district of Edge Hill, Liverpool, England and is one of the oldest railway stations in the world.

There have been two stations of that name. The first stood a short distance south-west of the present station and its remains are still visible, although the site is not open to the public.

== Description ==
The largest bore, in the centre, was the 2,250 yd (2,060 m) Wapping Tunnel, a long downwards incline leading to Wapping Dock and the world's first tunnel to be bored under a metropolis. The tunnel was worked by an endless rope running down the centre of one track and back along the other, the goods wagons descended by gravity, but were hauled up by the stationary steam engine. During the summer of 1829, prior to the tunnel opening for traffic, it became a popular subterranean promenade. It was whitewashed and lit by gas at intervals. On the 1 August alone, some three thousand people walked its length.

The tunnel to the north of the central bore was much shorter and inclined upwards, leading to the passenger terminal at Crown Street and a coal depot. Here the trains descended by gravity to Edge Hill station and were wound up into Crown Street.

The southern tunnel was originally a short length leading nowhere and used as a storage shed: its chief purpose was to create a symmetrical appearance. In 1832 it was cleared out and used as engine shed during the winters; later it became the wagon (Note: The older form "waggon" was used in the reference rather than the newer "wagon" form.) repairing shop until 1845 or 1846 when it was extended and expanded to provide two additional tracks into the Crown Street coal depot.

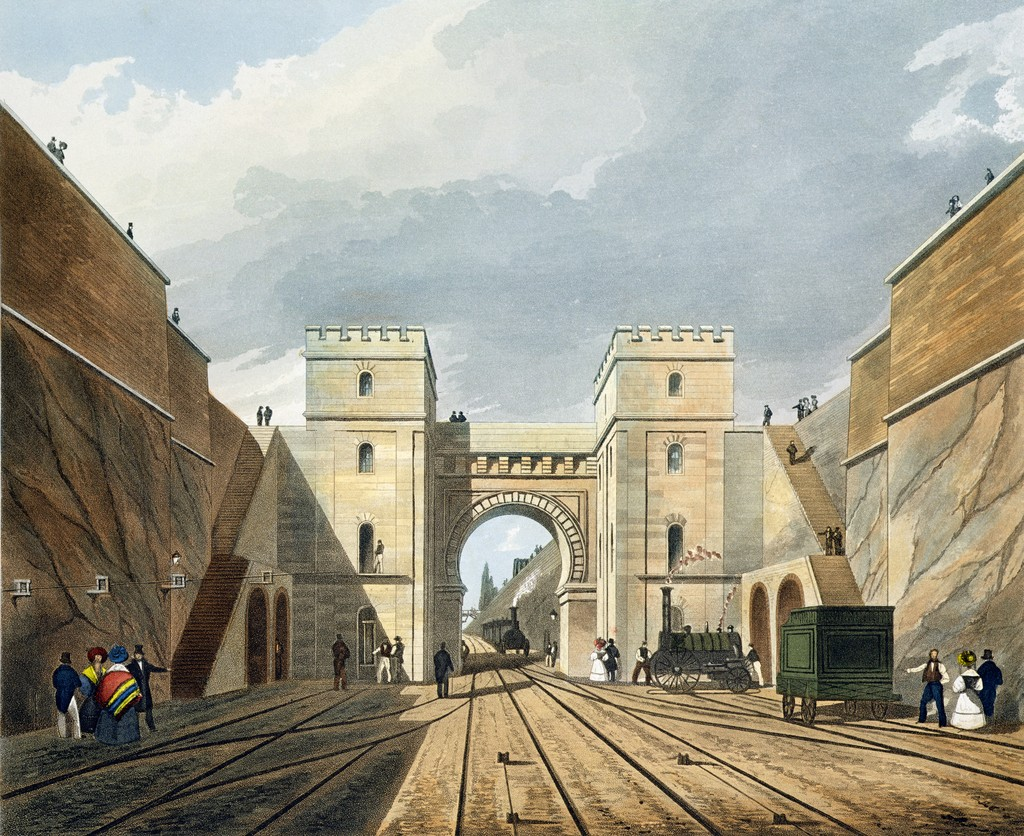
The Moorish Arch

At the opposite end of the station area were two engine houses in the form of towers on either side of the line, which was spanned at this point by the famous Moorish Arch. The arch was decorative with two battlemented towers and decorated masonry forming a grand and impressive entrance to Liverpool. But the arch was also functional and served as a bridge connecting the two engine houses across the deep cutting.

There were engine sheds and workshops cut into the rock either side of the station area, others were fitted up as passengers' waiting rooms and offices, there being no room in the cutting for ordinary buildings.

The engines were supplied with steam from return-flue boilers, two on each side of the tracks in the cutting walls. The smoke was channelled down rock cut flues to tall chimneys – known as the 'Pillars of Hercules' – situated either side of the tunnel entrances. A steam connecting pipe was installed in 1832 enabling either set of boilers to be used for either engine, at the same time a pedestrian subway was installed so that staff could move between the engine houses without having to move through the operating railway.

The station area was mainly used for the marshalling of trains and the coupling and uncoupling of locomotives, but first class passengers could also join the trains here, conveyed by horse-drawn carriages from Dale Street in the city centre.

In 2022, the site was listed as a scheduled monument by Historic England.

== Sources ==
- Bury, Thomas Talbot (1831), Coloured Views on the Liverpool and Manchester Railway: With Plates of the Coaches, Machines, Etc. ... with Descriptive Particulars, Serving as a Guide to Travellers on the Railway, London: Ackerman
- Ferneyhough, Frank (1980). Liverpool & Manchester Railway, 1830-1980. R. Hale. ISBN 978-0-7091-8137-8.
- Freeling, Arthur (1838), The Grand Junction Railway companion, etc. Freeling's Grand Junction Railway companion to Liverpool, Manchester and Birmingham and Liverpool, Manchester and Birmingham guide, etc, Whittaker & Company; Liverpool: Henry Lacey
- Thomas, R. H. G. (1980), The Liverpool & Manchester Railway, London: Batsford, ISBN 0-7134-0537-6
