= Liverpool Arena =

Multi-purpose indoor arena in Liverpool, England

Liverpool Arena M&S Bank Arena

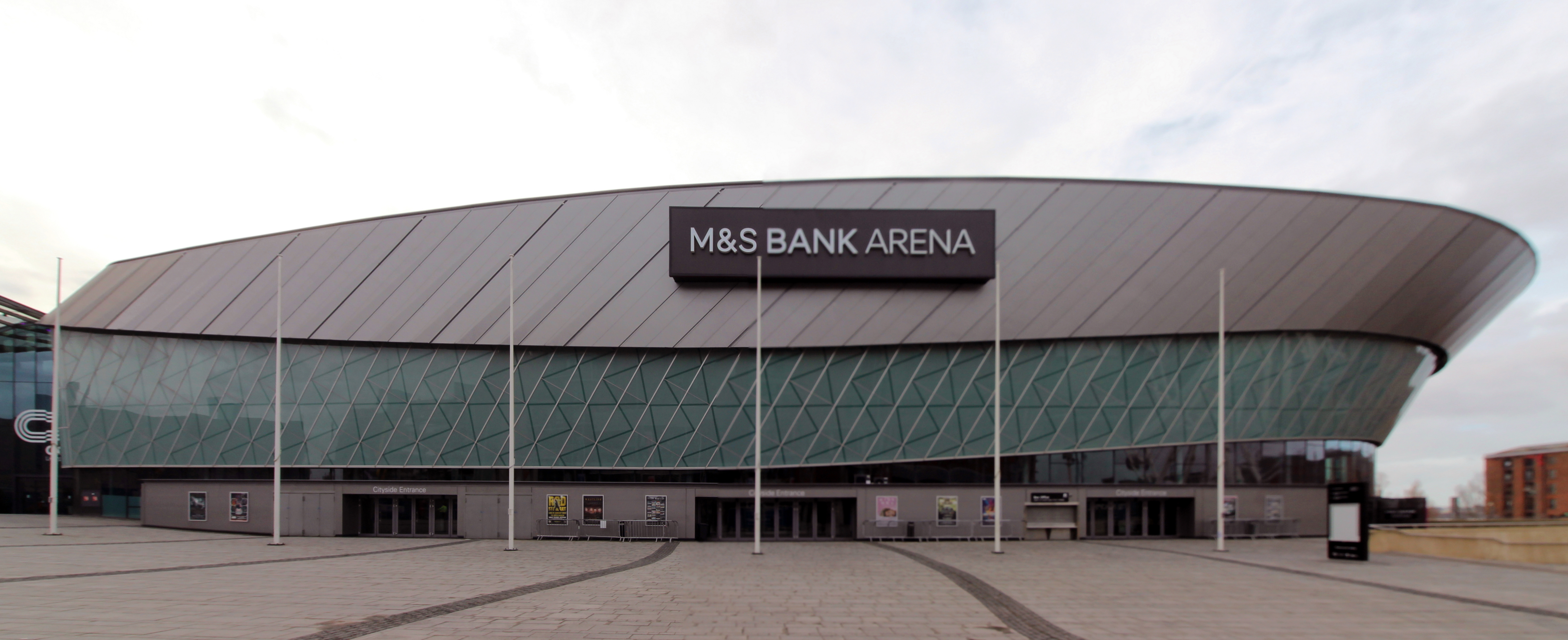
- Exterior of the arena (February 2019)
- Interactive map of Liverpool Arena; M&S Bank Arena
- Full name: M&S Bank Arena Liverpool
- Former names: Echo Arena (2008–2019)
- Address: 16 Monarchs Quay
- Location: Liverpool, L3 4FP, England
- Coordinates: 53°23′48″N 2°59′27.45″W
- Owner: Liverpool City Council
- Operator: ACC Liverpool Group Ltd
- Capacity: 7,513 to 10,600 (all seated); 11,000 (with standing)

Construction
- Groundbreaking: 15 May 2005
- Opened: 12 January 2008
- Expanded: 2012; 2017
- Cost: £164 million
- Architects: WilkinsonEyre; Sport Concepts
- Project managers: Davis Langdon; Gleeds
- Structural engineer: BuroHappold Engineering
- Services engineer: Faber Maunsell
- Main contractor: Bovis Lend Lease

Tenant
- Liverpool Basketball (SLB) (2026–present)

Website
- mandsbankarena.com

Liverpool Arena (currently known for sponsorship reasons as the M&S Bank Arena and previously the Echo Arena) is a multi-purpose indoor arena in the city centre of Liverpool, England. The venue hosts live music, comedy performances and sporting events, and forms part of Liverpool event campus ACC Liverpool – an interconnected arena, exhibition and convention centre. The venue serves a regional population of 2.5 million people and over 6.6 million across England's North West.

== Architecture and design ==
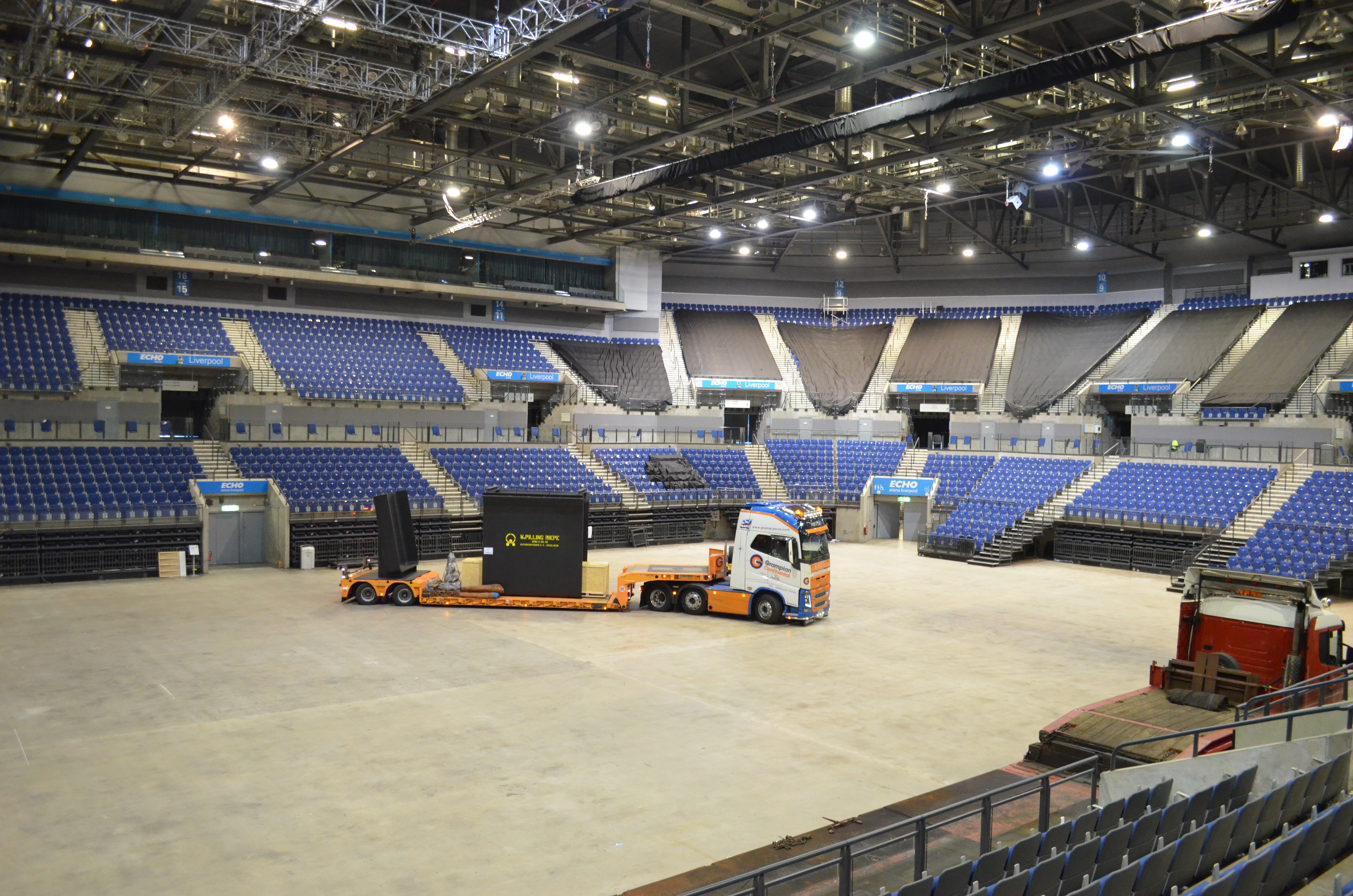
Interior of the arena (June 2015)

The arena was designed by Wilkinson Eyre architects and Sport Concepts. M&S Bank Arena is a flexible space offering a variety of standard and bespoke layouts. The arena has 7,513 permanent seats around three sides of a central floor suitable for hosting indoor sports events. The capacity for end-stage and in-the-round concerts is 10,600 including floor seating. With floor standing, the overall capacity of the arena is increased to 11,000. There are several corporate boxes situated around the sides of the arena.

There are six dressing rooms, five team locker rooms and two promoter offices within the arena. Vehicles weighing up to 38 tonnes can gain access to the basement of the arena. The complex has a BREEAM rating of "very good".

In September 2015, the opening of sister venue Exhibition Centre Liverpool resulted in a broader offer for standing concerts and international sporting events. This venue features 'Space by M&S Bank Arena', a flexible entertainment space for up to 7,000 standing capacity.

== History ==
The venue opened its doors on 12 January 2008 as the Echo Arena Liverpool, with the official opening ceremony for the Capital of Culture. The ceremony launched a year-long celebration and signified the culmination of a decade of regeneration in the city. The show, named 'Liverpool the Musical', featured 700 performers and took 15,000 hours to organise. Since opening, the arena has attracted more than 7 million visitors to over 3,800 events, as well as generating £1.6 billion in economic benefit for the Liverpool City Region.

=== Naming rights ===
In November 2018, it was announced that the Echo Arena Liverpool would be renamed to its current title, as part of a sponsorship deal with M&S Bank. The new name took effect from 7 January 2019, with the Liverpool Echo continuing as a business partner of the arena. A complete rebranding also took place inside the venue and across the Kings Dock site, before being unveiled on 31 January 2019.

=== 2017 car park fire ===
On the evening of 31 December 2017, a fire broke out in an adjacent multi-storey car park and as a consequence, the Liverpool International Horse Show, taking place at the arena, had to be cancelled. Around 80 horses were safely evacuated from temporary stabling built on the ground floor level of the car park, and held on the arena floor and the land surrounding the building. The fire continued into the early hours of 1 January 2018. The structure had to be demolished later and cars were removed. Virtually all of the 1,400 cars there were destroyed, but no serious harm to people or horses was reported. The car park was replaced in 2019.

=== Death of Eric Bristow ===
On 5 April 2018, after attending a Premier League Darts event, former darts player Eric Bristow collapsed in front of the venue due to a heart attack and later died.

== Events ==
=== Entertainment ===
The arena has hosted various entertainment events, including the 2008 MTV Europe Music Awards, and concerts by artists such as Justin Bieber, Little Mix, Paul McCartney, Beyoncé, and others.

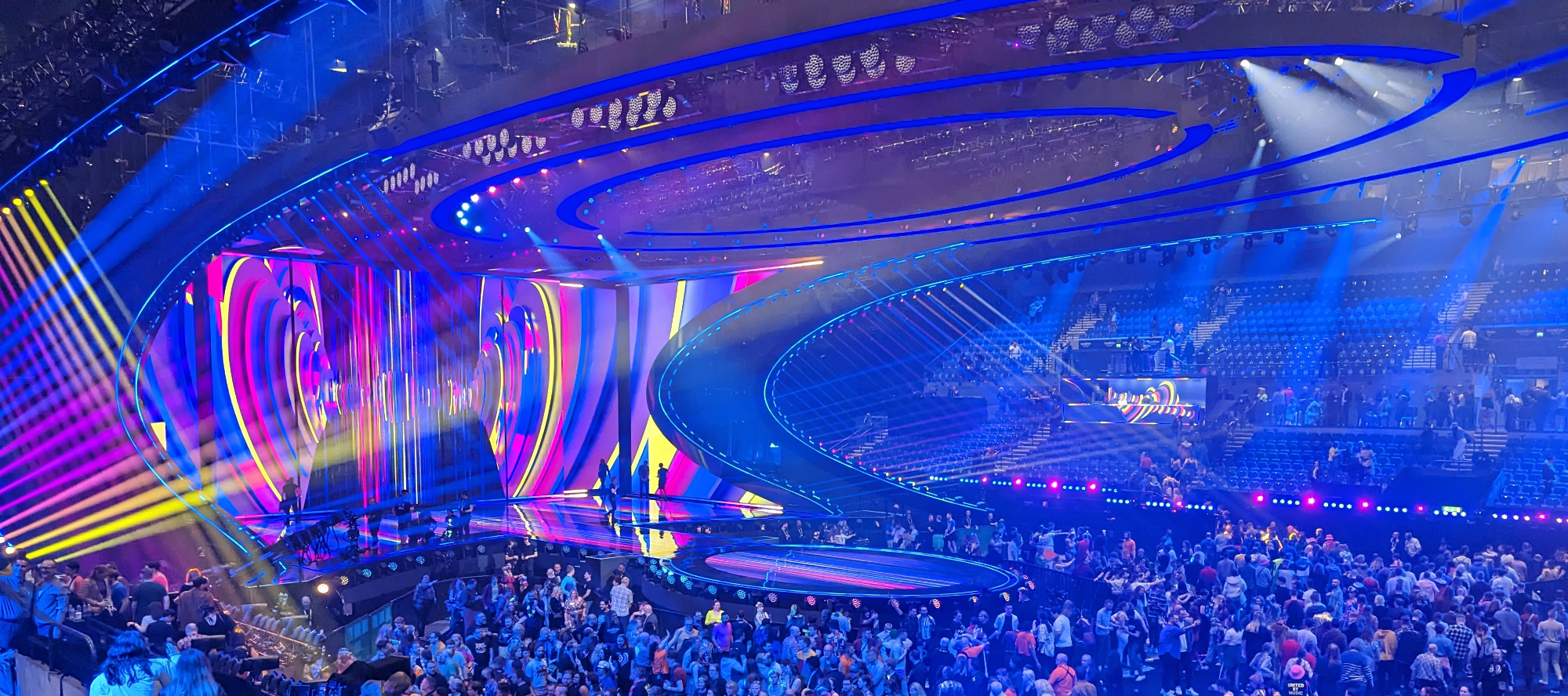
The arena during the Eurovision Song Contest 2023

On 7 October 2022, the BBC and the European Broadcasting Union (EBU) announced that the venue would host the Eurovision Song Contest 2023 on behalf of the previous year's winning country Ukraine, who was unable to meet the demands of hosting the event due to security concerns caused by the Russian invasion of Ukraine. The contest consisted of two semi-finals on 9 and 11 May, and a final on 13 May 2023, and was the first time that the contest took place in Liverpool. The 2023 contest marked the record-extending ninth time it was hosted in the UK, having last done so in Birmingham in 1998.

=== Sport ===
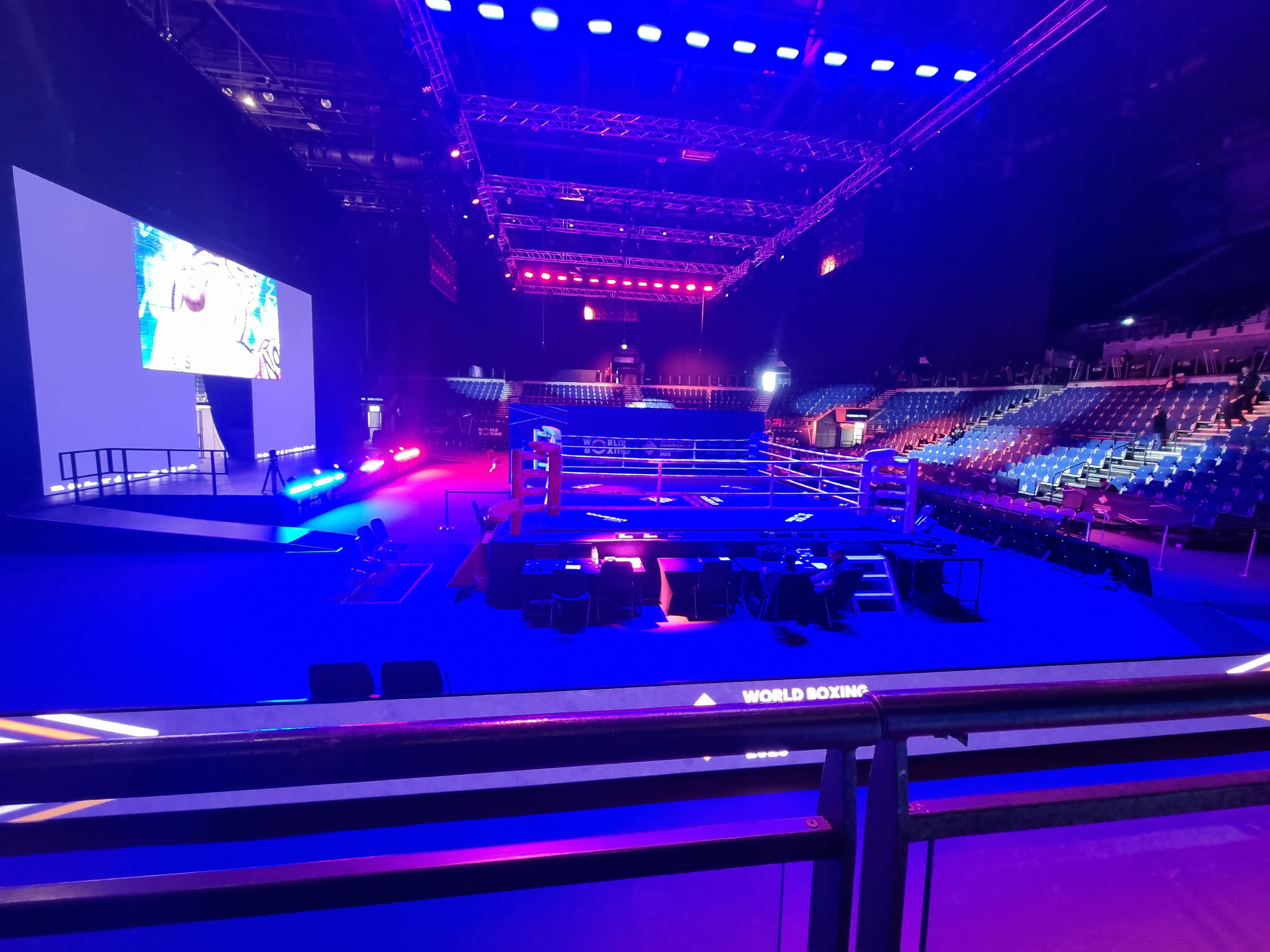
Interior during 2025 World Boxing Championships

The arena has hosted several major sporting competitions. From 2008 to 2010, the arena was the home of the Mersey Tigers basketball team. For a number of years, the Liverpool International Horse Show has been held in the arena at the end of the year. In 2021, it had to be cancelled due to the COVID-19 pandemic. It is also one of the venues for Premier League Darts since its opening.

In November 2021, the arena was intended as the venue for the final of the 2021 Wheelchair Rugby League World Cup but was postponed by a year due to the COVID-19 pandemic. The postponement made the arena unavailable and the final game was moved to the Manchester Central Convention Complex.

It has also hosted the British Gymnastics Championships annually since 2012 and hosted the World Artistic Gymnastics Championships in November 2022. It will be hosting the world championships again in 2030.

It has hosted the inaugural 2025 World Boxing Championships.

=== Professional wrestling ===
The arena will host All Elite Wrestling's annual Dynasty pay-per-view (PPV) event on 7 February 2027, marking the first Dynasty event to be held outside of North America.

== Transport links ==
Direct public transport to the M&S Bank Arena is by bus. James Street railway station is a short walk away and is served by the Merseyrail Wirral Line. The station is two stops away from Liverpool Lime Street mainline station.

The arena is situated opposite the portal of the now disused Wapping Tunnel, which runs from Edge Hill in the east of the city. There have been calls to reuse the 1.26 miles (2.03 km) tunnel with a station serving the arena and immediate docks on the site of the demolished Park Lane station which was at the end of the tunnel.

== See also ==
- List of indoor arenas in the United Kingdom

Events and tenants
Preceded by Olympiahalle; Munich	MTV Europe Music Awards; 2008	Succeeded by Mercedes-Benz Arena; Berlin
Preceded by SEC Centre; Glasgow	MOBO Awards; 2010	Succeeded by SEC Centre; Glasgow
Preceded by SEC Centre; Glasgow	MOBO Awards; 2012	Succeeded by OVO Hydro; Glasgow
Preceded by Olympic Park; Sydney	Netball World Cup; 2019	Succeeded by International Convention Centre; Cape Town
Preceded by PalaOlimpico; Turin	Eurovision Song Contest; 2023	Succeeded by Malmö Arena; Malmö
