= Edge Hill Spur =

Overview
- Status: Proposed
- Locale: Liverpool

Technical
- Track gauge: 4 ft 8 1/2 in (1,435 mm) standard gauge

The Edge Hill Spur is a proposed railway development first conceived in the 1960s to connect Liverpool’s eastern suburbs with the city centre via the Merseyrail network. The project intended to link Liverpool Central with Edge Hill station using disused freight tunnels such as the Wapping or Victoria tunnels. While partially prepared during Northern Line construction in the 1970s, the scheme was never completed due to financial and political challenges. It remains safeguarded with renewed interest in 2016 as part of efforts to improve rail connectivity in Liverpool’s Knowledge Quarter.

== Background and early proposals ==
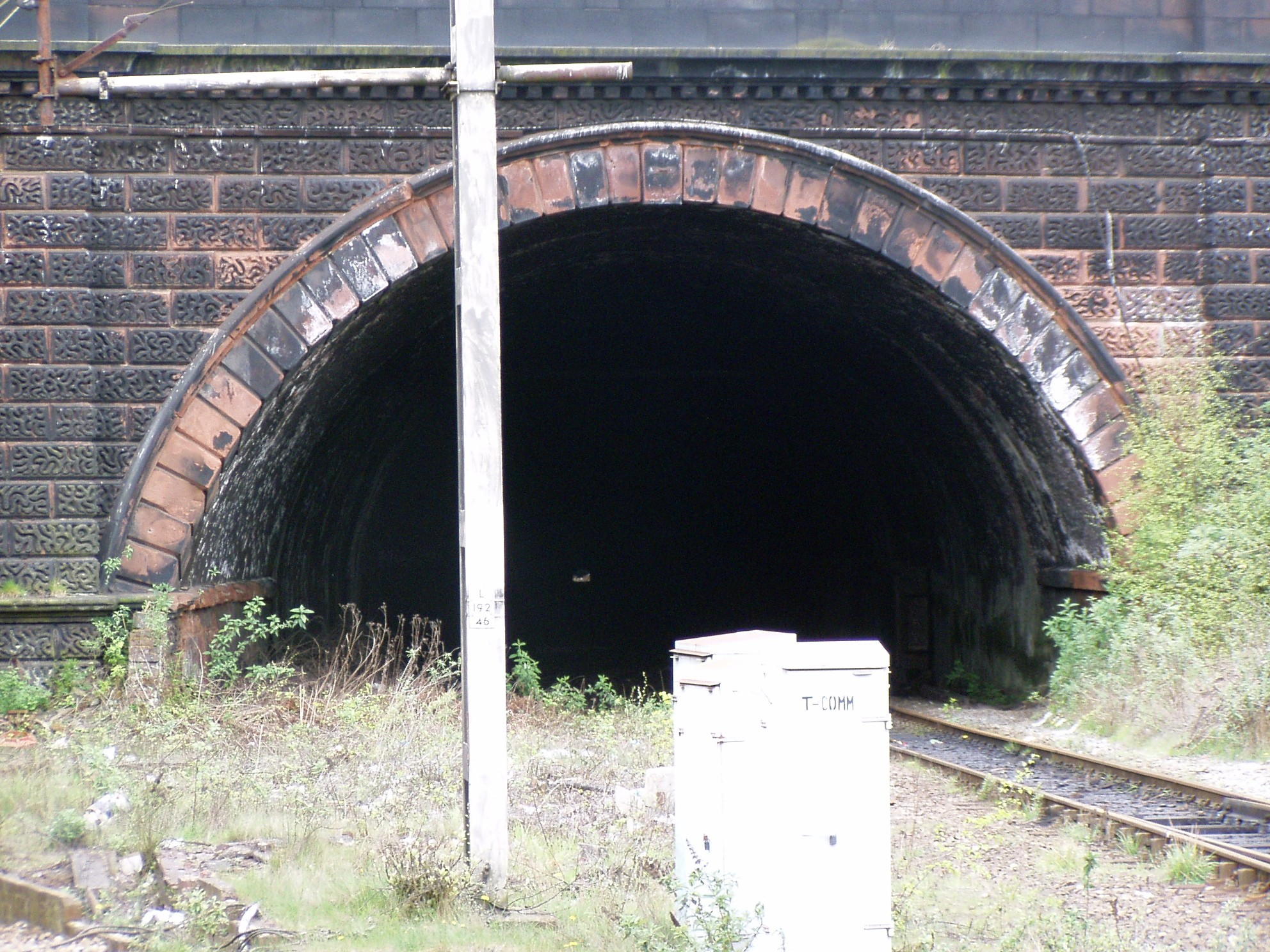
Victoria/Waterloo Tunnel portal at Edge Hill Station. The tunnel is an option for the Edge Hill Spur scheme.

In the 1960s and early 1970s, the Edge Hill Spur scheme was proposed to link Liverpool's eastern suburbs with the central underground section of Merseyrail. The plan involved extending the network from Liverpool Central Station to Edge Hill Station using existing freight tunnels. Although the scheme was eventually dropped, construction of junctions and two header tunnels south of Central station was completed during the Northern Line tunnel construction to allow for the Spur's future development.

The Edge Hill Spur aimed to connect the City Line branches from Liverpool's east into the electrified Merseyrail network, enhancing network integration and connectivity. By diverting local trains entering from the east underground, it would have freed platform space at Lime Street station for mid and long-haul routes. Initially, the plan was to reuse the 1829 Wapping freight tunnel, creating two new single-track tunnels branching from the Northern Line at Liverpool Central South Junction. This would have provided access to Edge Hill via the historic Cavendish cutting, built for the 1830 Liverpool and Manchester Railway. A flyover east of Edge Hill Station would have connected to the City Line, although this flyover has since been demolished.

In the early 1970s, Liverpool City Council proposed an alternative route, which was adopted. This revised plan included constructing a new underground station near Liverpool University, behind the Student's Union building in Mount Pleasant. The new tunnels would curve north, passing beneath the mainline Lime Street station approach and accessing Edge Hill via the Waterloo/Victoria Tunnel. This route would emerge at Edge Hill Station on the north side of the main lines, eliminating the need for a flyover.

Although the 1975 Merseyside Metropolitan Railway Act granted powers to build this line, construction was postponed due to financial cutbacks and political opposition, which also halted the Outer Rail Loop project. The eastern part of Liverpool has suffered from reduced connectivity ever since. Attempts to revive the project in the mid-1980s were found to be financially unviable. After the collapse of the Merseytram scheme in 2006, there were renewed proposals to revive the Spur, and the route remains safeguarded in MerseyTravel's 30-year plan.

== Recent proposals ==
In 2016, Liverpool's then mayor Joe Anderson proposed resurrecting the Edge Hill Spur with a new station at Paddington Village, as part of expanding Liverpool's Knowledge Quarter. A feasibility study commissioned in May 2016 found that the Wapping Tunnel, though suffering from flooding in places, was in good condition and the concept of reopening it was viable with some remedial work required.
