= Edge Hill, Liverpool =

Coordinates: 53.395°N 2.952°W

Edge Hill
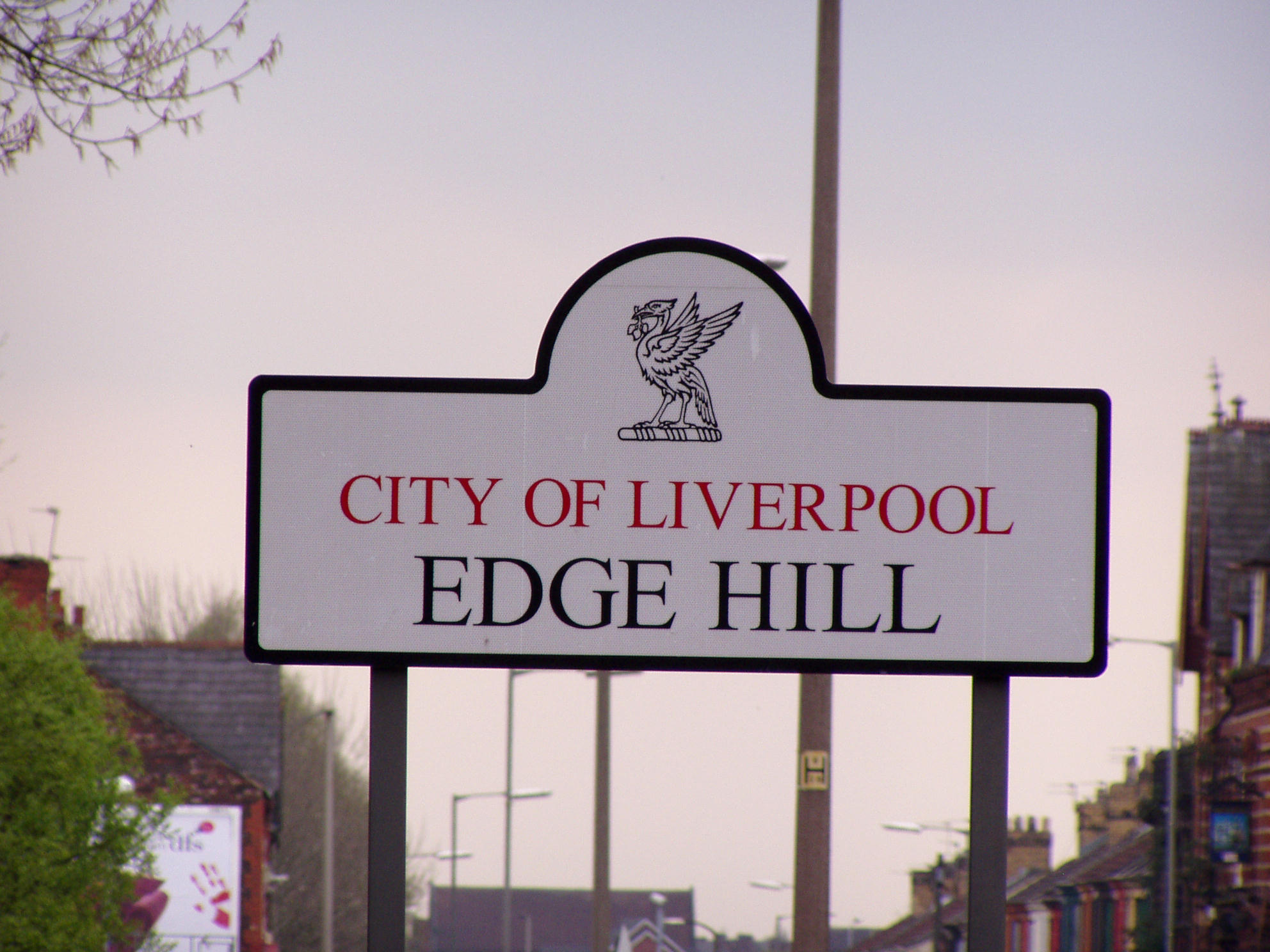
- Sign on Holt Road at the boundary of Edge Hill

- Location within Merseyside
- OS grid reference: SJ365900
- Metropolitan borough: Liverpool
- Metropolitan county: Merseyside
- Region: North West
- Country: England
- Sovereign state: United Kingdom
- Post town: LIVERPOOL
- Postcode district: L7
- Dialling code: 0151
- Police: Merseyside
- Fire: Merseyside
- Ambulance: North West
- UK Parliament: Liverpool Wavertree

Edge Hill is a district of Liverpool, England, south east of the city centre, bordered by Kensington, Wavertree and Toxteth.

Edge Hill University was founded here, but moved to Ormskirk in the 1930s.

== History ==
The area was first developed in the late 18th-early 19th century Georgian era. Many of the Georgian houses of the time still survive. Edge Hill was designated a Conservation Area in 1979. Most of the Georgian property around St. Mary's Church is now English Heritage listed. The later terraces, of the Victorian era, have also largely been demolished. Although some modern housing has been built, the area still has a depopulated appearance, with many vacant lots and derelict pubs and shops.

Joseph Williamson (1769–1840), a tobacco magnate, was responsible for much of the building in the area in the early 19th century. The "Mole of Edge Hill" employed hundreds of men to construct the Williamson Tunnels beneath the area. Part of the tunnel network is now open to the public as a tourist attraction.

In the early 19th century, Edge Hill was the site of two railway works. Both the Liverpool and Manchester Railway and the Grand Junction Railway initially set up workshops, but with restricted expansion as the business grew, the Grand Junction Railway moved its main locomotive production to Crewe in 1843. Locomotives continued to be built at Edge Hill until 1851. Liverpool and Manchester were absorbed by the Grand Junction in 1845, which in turn became part of the London and North Western Railway in 1846.

The first Edge Hill station was built in 1830 on a site about 150m from its present location. Of this little remains. There was a "Moorish Arch" with a stationary engine hauling trains up and down from Crown Street Station until locomotive-hauled trains were able to cope with the gradient. The current station dates from 1836 when the main city railway terminus was moved to Lime Street. The station retains its original buildings but is very quiet owing to the sheer lack of population or industry in the area. These buildings are the oldest in the world and are still open to the public at working railway stations.

Formerly all trains stopped at Edge Hill at the entrance to the tunnel to Lime Street station, giving rise to "getting off at Edge Hill" as a euphemism for coitus interruptus.

A local school on Durning Road, the Ernest Brown Junior Instructional College, was the site of one of the worst civilian bombings of the Second World War. On 29 November 1940, a parachute mine dropped by the Luftwaffe exploded on the building which was being used as an air raid shelter by 300 people. The structure collapsed on itself and destroyed boilers and furnaces inside, which spilled into the shelter. This resulted in many suffering extreme burns or being boiled alive. There was further damage and loss of life when nearby gas mains exploded. Prime Minister, Winston Churchill, referred to the incident as "the single worst civilian incident of the war". 166 people were killed with many more physically and mentally injured. Survivors suffered severe psychological trauma for many years afterwards.

Edge Hill was the site of huge railway marshalling yards until the 1970s, sorting trains to and from the docks via the Victoria Tunnel and Wapping Tunnel to Park Lane and Waterloo goods stations on the dockside.

Crown Street Resource Centre is a mental health resource centre in Edge Hill that opened in 1982 and is run by Liverpool social services and Merseycare for people living in the Liverpool city area.

Edge Hill University began work in the area in 1885 as a teacher training college, though it moved to its current Ormskirk site in 1933.

== Notable residents ==
Herbert Rowse Armstrong, the Hay poisoner, lived at 52 Durning Road, Edge Hill whilst practising as a solicitor in the city.

Patrick Mahon, convicted of the 1924 murder of Emily Kaye at the Crumbles, Eastbourne, grew up on Helena Street. The site of the street is now covered by a DIY store car park.

The actor Chris Mason was born in Edge Hill.

Elon Musk's grandmother, Cora Robinson, was born at 36 Bridge Road, Edge Hill in 1923 and lived there until c1939.

English rock guitarist and member off the Welsh band Badfinger Joey Molland was born in Edge Hill.
