= Crown Street railway station =

Former railway terminus in Liverpool, England

Crown Street
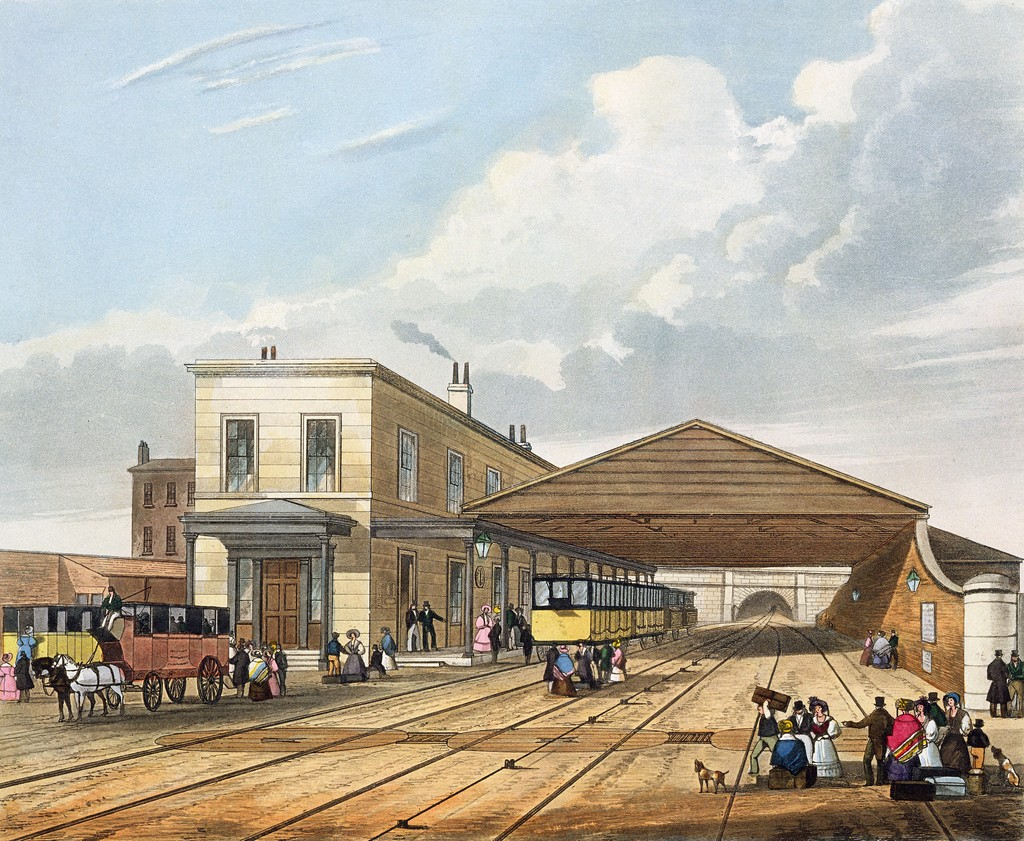
- An 1833 engraving of Crown Street, the original Liverpool terminus of the Liverpool and Manchester Railway

General information
- Location: England
- Coordinates: 53.40037°N 2.95720°W

Other information
- Status: Disused

History
- Original company: Liverpool and Manchester Railway
- Pre-grouping: London and North Western Railway
- Post-grouping: London, Midland and Scottish Railway

Key dates
- 15 September 1830: Opened as Liverpool
- 15 August 1836: Closed to passenger traffic
- 1972: Closed to freight traffic
Location

Crown Street railway station was the Liverpool terminus railway station of the Liverpool and Manchester Railway in Liverpool, England, it opened on 15 September 1830. The station was one of the world's first on an inter-city passenger railway in which all services were operated by mechanical traction.

The station was only used for passengers for six years before being replaced by Lime Street which was closer to Liverpool City centre.

The station was demolished as the site was converted into a coal and goods yard which remained in use until 1972. The location of the station is now a park with little trace of any railway facilities.

== Passenger station ==
=== Opening ===
The station was opened to the public on 17 September 1830, it had had a ceremonial opening as part of the opening of the railway on 15 September 1830, and there had been a charter train to Manchester and back for the Society of Friends to and from their quarterly meeting on 16 September 1830.

The station was the Liverpool terminus of the world's first inter-city double-track mainline public railway on which all services were operated by mechanical traction, the Liverpool and Manchester Railway. It was also one the first buildings to be expressly designed and purpose built as a railway "station". The station was only ever known as Liverpool during its working life, Crown Street was only used in explanatory text.

=== Access ===
The station was accessed by a 291 yd (266 m) long 15 ft (4.6 m) wide and 12 ft (3.7 m) high single track tunnel which rises from the deep Edge Hill Cutting to the east.

Together with the adjacent 1.26 mi (2.03 km) Wapping Tunnel, these were the first tunnels to be bored under a metropolis. The Wapping Tunnel runs under the Crown Street station site. The tunnels were gas-lit from opening. At the Edge Hill end of the tunnels there were three portals, the third (left-hand one looking from Edge Hill) was a dummy added for the sake of symmetry and only penetrated 80 ft (24 m). To get to the station trains would arrive at Edge Hill, have their locomotive removed and be attached to a rope which would be wound by stationary steam engines, located in the Edge Hill cutting, and pulled up to Crown Street, here the rope would be detached, attached to a small four-wheeled carriage called a pilot and returned to Edge Hill by horse-power ready for the next train. The train at Crown Street would then be man or horse powered around the station. Departures would be manoeuvred to the tunnel entrance and descended by gravity.

Passengers from Liverpool had to get to Crown Street before boarding the carriages, first class passengers had the option of taking a horse-drawn omnibus from the company's office in Dale Street, other classes had to find their own way. The omnibuses could carry sixty-eight first class passengers and their luggage and operated on a first-come first-served basis, the journey was timed to take twenty minutes and was often late.

=== Description ===
A plain two-storey building, classical in concept with Venetian windows giving on to a single platform covered by a long flat canopy on columns set close to the edge from which sprang wooden queen-post trusses carrying an overall roof to screen wall opposite. This was the first expression as a trainshed, as distinct from a dual-purpose goods shed. The station had all the features now associated with a railway passenger station, ticket office, waiting accommodation, a defined area for boarding the trains, despite there being no precedent to work from. A ladies waiting room with female attendant was provided in March 1831.

The station had three lines of rails, the centre one having the tunnel rope, they were connected by points at the tunnel end and wooden turnplates (turntables) at the other. Alongside the passenger station, but screened from it were the goods and coal yards as well as access to Millfield Works.

John Foster, the younger, with his partner John Stewart designed the station roof, and possibly the whole station. The roof may not have been in the original station design as Dawson (2020) notes that an order was placed for such a roof in November 1830.

The company directors soon realised that Crown Street station was too far from Liverpool city centre, and the use of expensive, time consuming buses to get passengers to and from the city centre was inefficient. They got permission from Parliament to provide a new terminus station in the city centre and in 1836 opened Liverpool Lime Street.

=== Operations ===
The station was staffed by one clerk until a second was added in March 1835, to be closely followed in April 1835 with an assistant boy, who happened to be the original clerk's son.

After a few weeks of settling in, a new timetable was issued effective from 4 October 1830, there were six trains in each direction, first-class trains leaving from both terminals at 0700, 1000, 1300 & 1630 and second-class trains at 0800 & 1400. (Note: The L&MR had first and second class coaches but they ran them as first and second class trains, first class trains were composed of only first class coaches, were faster because they had fewer stops, usually only Newton Junction, whereas second class trains stopped wherever required, initially they had only second class coaches but later also had first class for the convenience of first class passengers who wished to use intermediate stations.)

== Goods station and coal yard ==
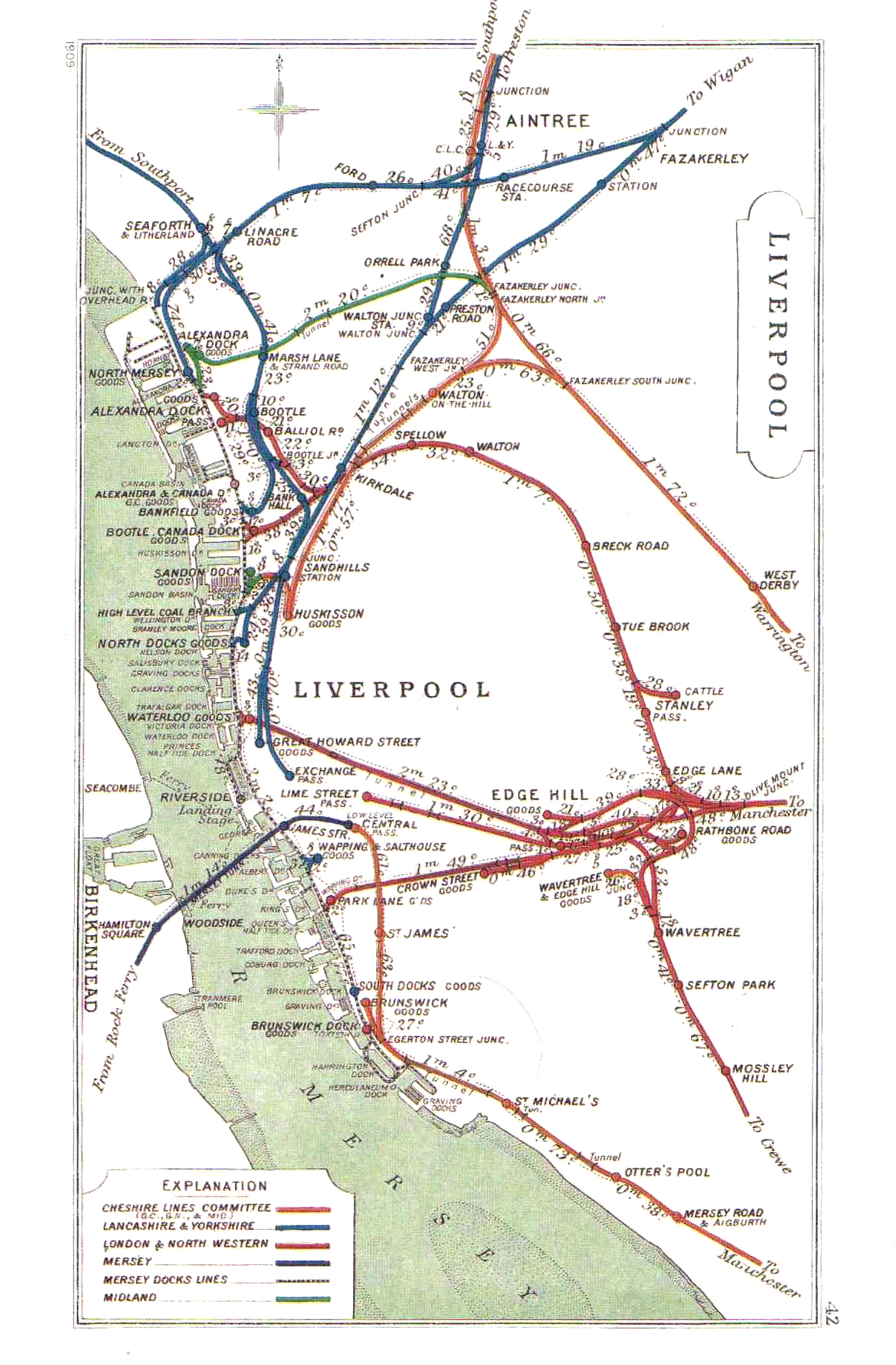
Liverpool RJD 42

It was planned from inception that the station would have a coal yard, indeed Colonel George Legh of Newton had requested space for his coals in 1828. The coal trade was immediately successful and the facilities at Crown Street had to be expanded in 1831 and 1832 with more turntables provided. In 1832 Thomas Legh arranged for his own coal-yard to be laid out to the north of Crown Street, the railway allowed access provided it was only used as a coal-yard and they retained the right-of-way.

The station closed to passengers when Liverpool Lime Street opened on 15 August 1836. The buildings were demolished soon after closure, it is not known when, and the site was used to enlarge the goods yard and in particular the coal depot. (Note: The station stood immediately to the west of the exit portal of the tunnel from Edge Hill which carried Smithdown Lane, this is noticeable on Bury's engraving of the station (the only picture evidence available) this location was directly in the way of the access lines into the extensive coal yard, see the OS map showing lines in 1864.)

The railway carried livestock and Crown Street had pig pens installed, they needed enlarging in 1841 as the traffic increased. By this time the Grand Junction Railway was also using the station facilities and they had their own separate pens and loading ramps.

Additional powers were sought to improve access to the site in 1845. The dummy tunnel entrance at Edge Hill was used to form a full sized double-track 124 yd (113 m) long tunnel on the south side of the Wapping tunnel, the tunnel came into service around 1846.

By 1864 a goods shed had been constructed to the east of Smithdown Lane and south of the mainline. By 1908 the section of the coal yard furthest north had become an agricultural depôt belonging to the London and North Western Railway who had taken over the line by this time.

The little that remained of the 1830 terminus was lost in a WW2 air raid, and the coal depot closed permanently when services through the two tunnels ended in 1972.

=== Millfield ===
Immediately to the south of Crown Street station was an area known as Millfield or Gray's yard where a wagon and carriage shop was established, there was also a large marshalling area and a stores depot. These works expanded to include a boiler shop and an iron foundry when the station closed to passengers.

== Current use of the site ==
The area has been landscaped as a park with the original 1830 single track tunnel's western portal covered over. Student accommodation for the nearby University of Liverpool has been built on a part of the old coal yard site.

The Wapping Tunnel's ventilation tower and a plaque commemorate the station's place in history. There are also a small number of stone sleeper blocks close to the fence on Falkner Street.

== Potential new station ==
The proposal for Paddington Village mentions that a station in the 2014 Liverpool City Region, (LCR) Long Term Rail Strategy would be of use, the station would be in the Victoria Tunnel but the route was described as using a connection from that to Central Station via the Wapping Tunnel called the Edge Hill Spur.

However, the Paddington Village Spatial Regeneration Framework document of October 2016, page 36, specifically gives a map with a station on the old Crown Street station site, stating the locations as Crown Street/Myrtle Street, but this is not the suggested site of a station on the Archbishop Blanche School site to its north.

Preceding station	Disused railways	Following station
Park Lane goods Line and station closed	London and North Western Railway; Liverpool and Manchester Railway	Edge Hill; Line closed, station open

== Bibliography ==
- Biddle, Gordon (1973). Victorian stations; railway stations in England & Wales, 1830-1923;. Newton Abbot [England]: David & Charles. ISBN 0-7153-5949-5. OCLC 812317.
- Brown, Joe (2021). Liverpool & Manchester Railway Atlas. Manchester: Crécy Publishing. ISBN 9780860936879. OCLC 1112373294.
- Bury, Thomas Talbot (1976) [1831]. Coloured Views on the Liverpool and Manchester Railway: A facsimile of the original edition published in 1831 by R. Ackerman. London: Hugh Broadbent.
- Carlson, Robert Eugene (1969). The Liverpool & Manchester Railway Project, 1821-1831. Newton Abbot: David & Charles. ISBN 978-0-7153-4646-4.
- Dawson, Anthony (2016). The Liverpool & Manchester Railway. Stroud: Amberley Publishing.
- Dawson, Anthony (2020). The Liverpool and Manchester Railway : an operating history. Barnsley, South Yorkshire. ISBN 978-1-4738-9913-1. OCLC 1204607582.
- Donaghy, Thomas J. (1972). Liverpool & Manchester Railway operations, 1831-1845. Newton Abbot, Devon: David and Charles. ISBN 0-7153-5705-0.
- Ferneyhough, Frank (1980). Liverpool & Manchester Railway, 1830-1980. R. Hale. ISBN 978-0-7091-8137-8.
- Holt, Geoffrey O.; Biddle, Gordon (1986). The North West. A Regional history of the railways of Great Britain. Vol. 10 (2nd ed.). David St. John Thomas. ISBN 978-0-946537-34-1. OCLC 643506870.
- Marshall, John (1981). Forgotten Railways:North-West England. David & Charles. ISBN 0-7153-8003-6.
- Quick, Michael (2023) [2001]. Railway passenger stations in Great Britain: a chronology (PDF). version 5.05. Railway & Canal Historical Society.
- Simmons, Jack (1986). The railways of Britain: A Journey through History. London: Macmillan. ISBN 0-333-40766-0. OCLC 59096220.
- Simmons, Jack (1995) [1991]. The Victorian Railway (1st Paperback ed.). London: Thames & Hudson Ltd. ISBN 978-0-500-28810-8.
- Simmons, Jack (1997). "Class distinctions". In Simmons, Jack; Biddle, Gordon (eds.). The Oxford Companion to British Railway History From 1603 to the 1990s (1st ed.). Oxford: Oxford University Press. pp. 84–87. ISBN 0-19-211697-5.
- Singleton, David (1975). Liverpool and Manchester Railway : a mile by mile guide to the world's first "modern" railway. Clapham, N. Yorkshire: Dalesman. OCLC 1310749385.
- Thomas, R. H. G. (1980). The Liverpool & Manchester Railway. London: Batsford. ISBN 0-7134-0537-6.
- Wright, Paul (2008). Lost Termini of North West England. Disused Stations: Closed Railway Stations in the UK. ISBN 978-1-85794-316-0.
