= Park Lane railway goods station =

Park Lane Goods
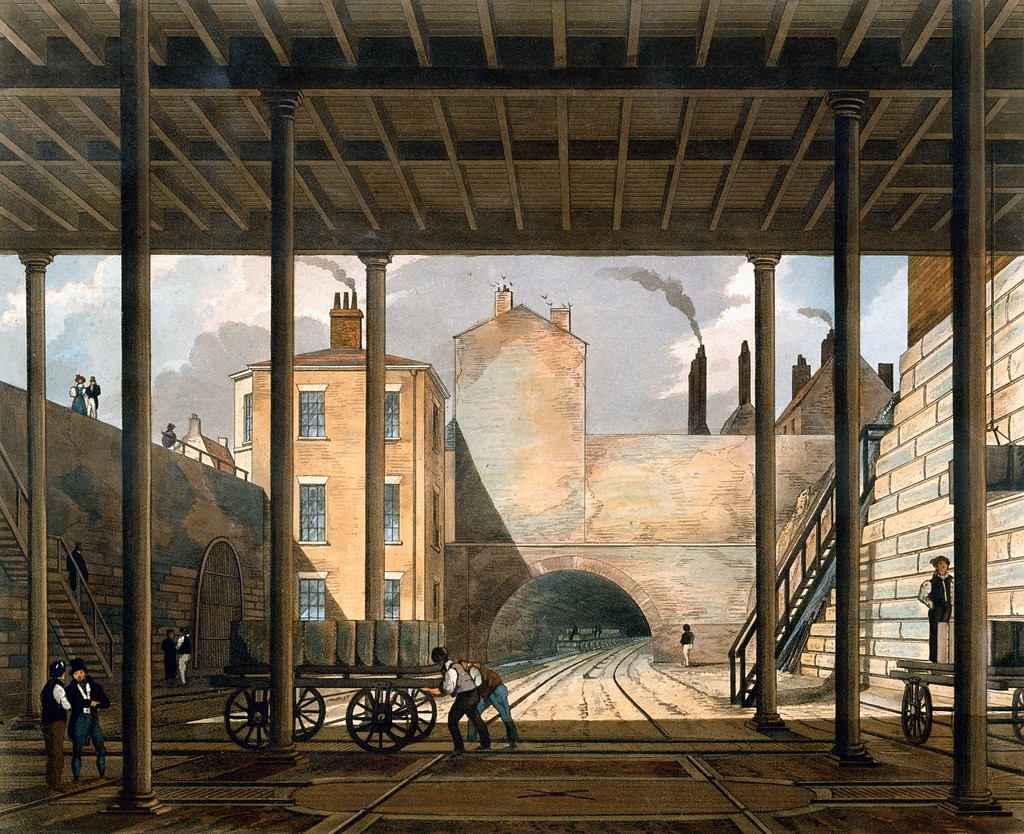
- The facilities in 1831

General information
- Location: Wapping Dock, Liverpool; England
- Coordinates: 53.3977°N 2.9855°W
- Grid reference: SJ344894

Other information
- Status: Disused

History
- Original company: Liverpool and Manchester Railway
- Pre-grouping: London and North Western Railway
- Post-grouping: London, Midland and Scottish Railway

Key dates
- 1830: Opened
- 1972: Closed
Location

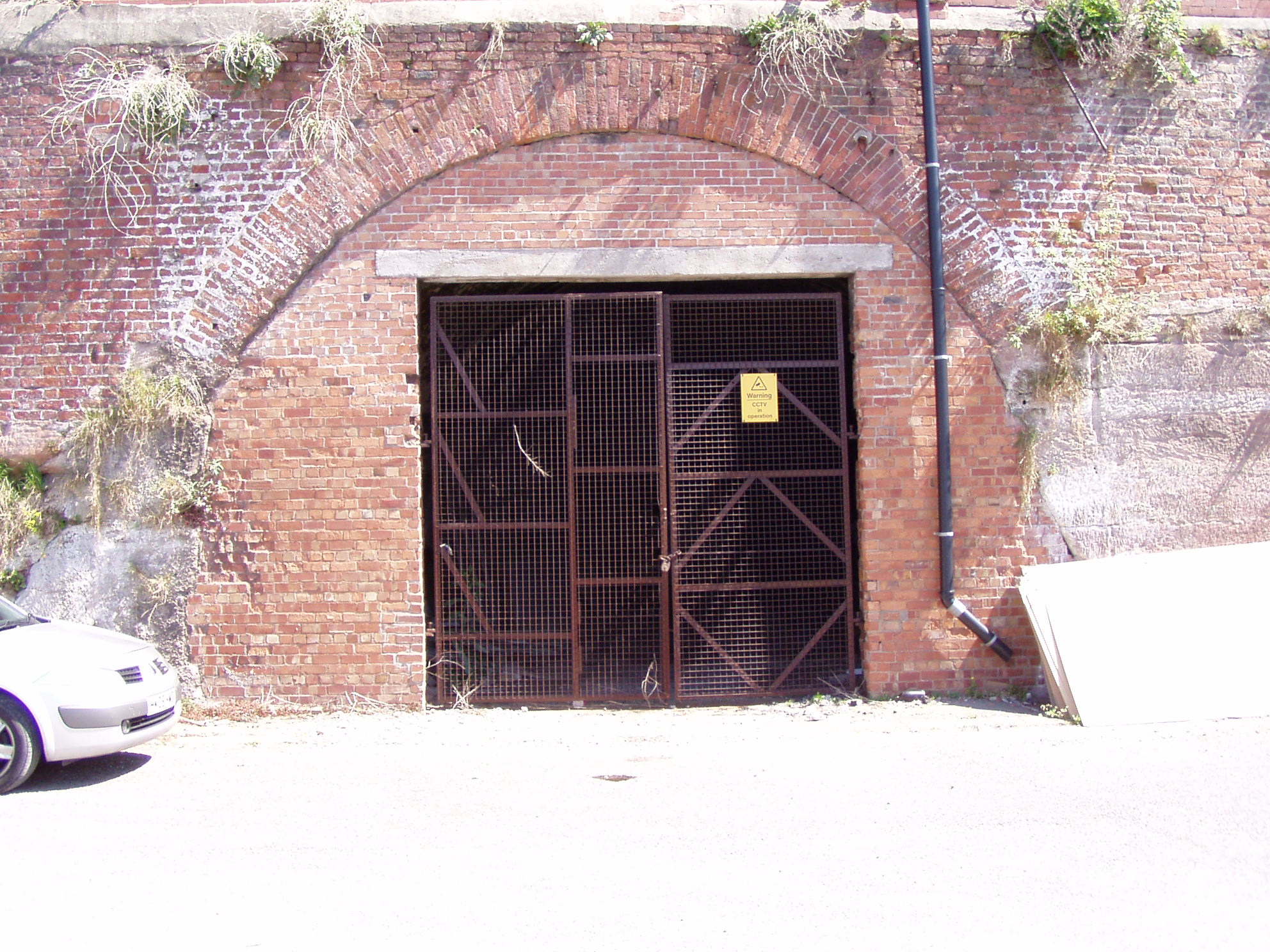
All that remains is the Wapping Tunnel's portal at Kings Dock Road

Park Lane was the world's first goods terminus on the Liverpool and Manchester Railway serving the south end Liverpool Docks. The station was opened in 1830. Its initial name was Wapping Station. The goods station was accessed from Edge Hill rail junction in the east of the city via the 1.26 miles (2.03 km) long Wapping Tunnel.

The goods station suffered from heavy German air raids during the Second World War, being mostly rebuilt after the conflict. The station along with the Wapping Tunnel was closed in 1972 and subsequently demolished. The tunnel remains intact.

== Future proposals ==
The Kings Dock Arena is opposite the Wapping Tunnel's portal. There have been many calls to reuse the long tunnel giving a station serving the Kings Dock Arena and immediate docks on the old goods station site.

In August 2009, the Liverpool Daily Post reported that a new Merseyrail Light-rail tram-train link from Edge Hill in the east of the city to the Arena at Kings Dock near the city centre was being considered. The Wapping Tunnel links the two locations.

Preceding station	Disused railways	Following station
Terminus	Liverpool and Manchester Railway; Wapping Tunnel	Crown Street; Line and station closed
