= Goods station =

Railway station for goods

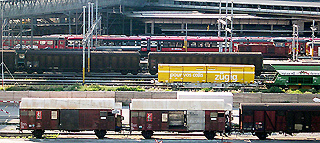
Goods station in Lucerne, Switzerland

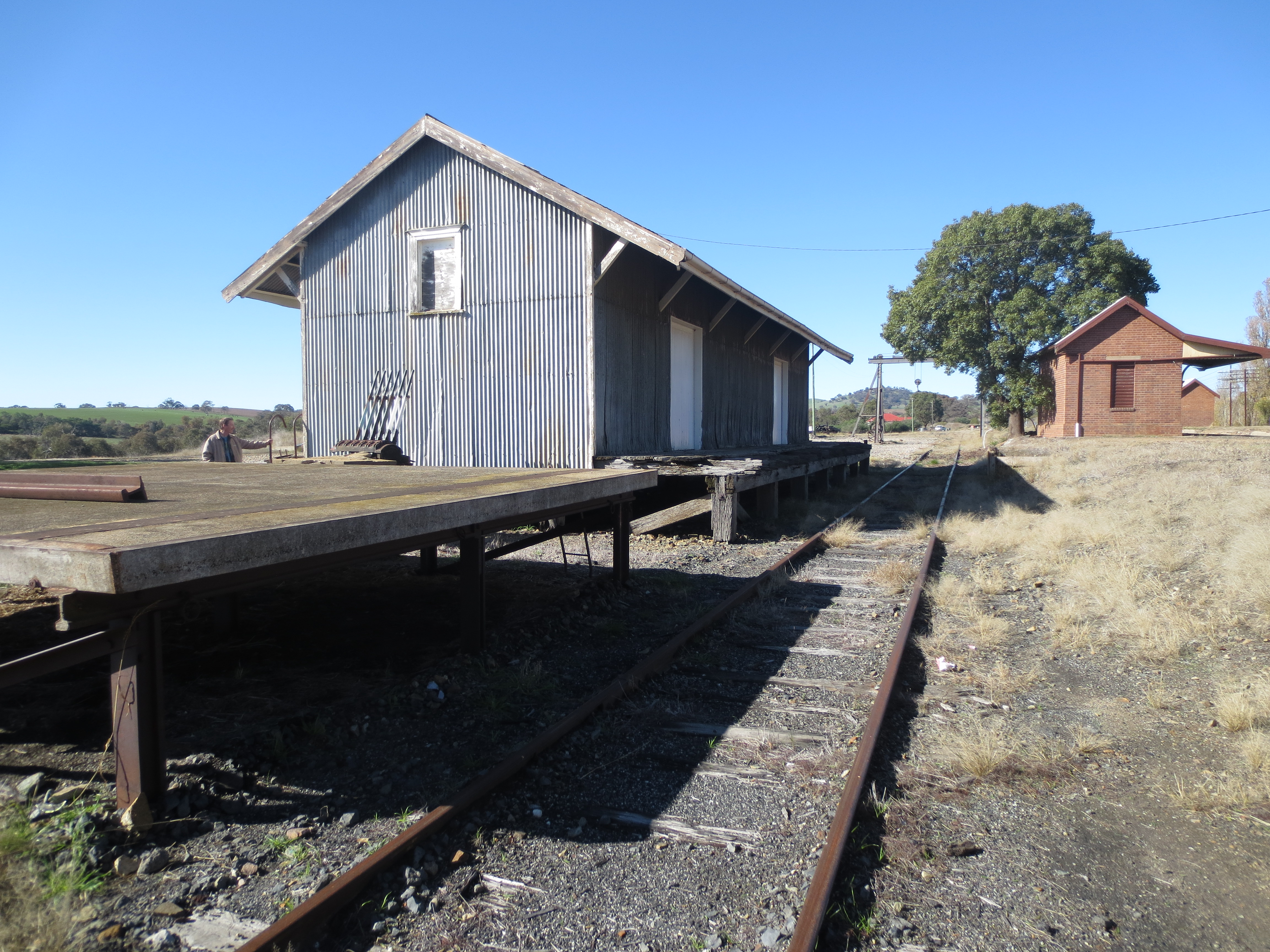
Typical loading platform in goods station in small country town (abandoned)

A goods station (also known as a goods yard or goods depot) or freight station is, in the widest sense, a railway station where, either exclusively or predominantly, goods (or freight), such as merchandise, parcels, and manufactured items, are loaded onto or unloaded from ships or road vehicles and/or where goods wagons are transferred to local sidings.

A station where goods are not specifically received or dispatched but simply transferred on their way to their destination between the railway and another means of transport, such as ships or lorries, may be referred to as a transshipment station. This often takes the form of a container terminal and may also be known as a container station.

Goods stations were more widespread in the days when the railways were common carriers and were often converted from former passenger stations whose traffic had moved elsewhere.

== First goods station ==
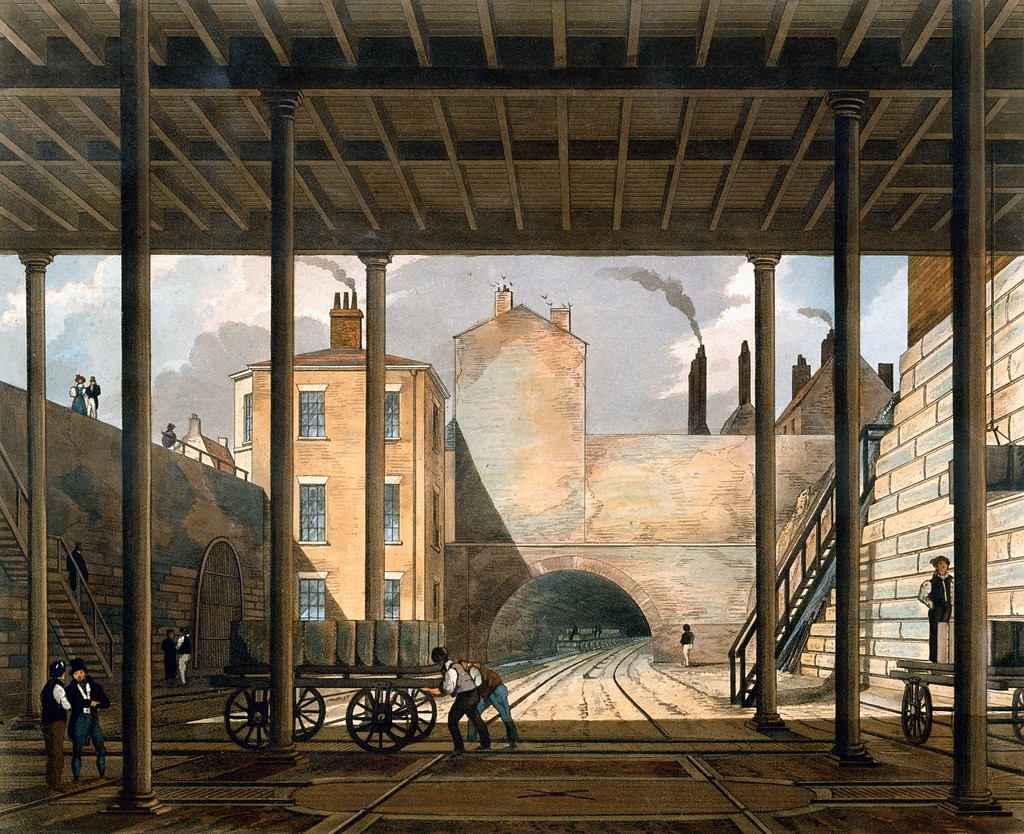
Reached by a 1.24-mile (2 km) long tunnel, the 1830 Park Lane Goods Terminus at Liverpool's docks was the world's first station built entirely for freight.

The world's first dedicated goods terminal was the 1830 Park Lane Goods Station at the South End Liverpool Docks. Built in 1830 the terminal was reached by a 1.24-mile (2 km) tunnel from Edge Hill in the east of the city. The station was a part of the Liverpool and Manchester Railway, which was also a first being the first inter-city railway.

== Location ==
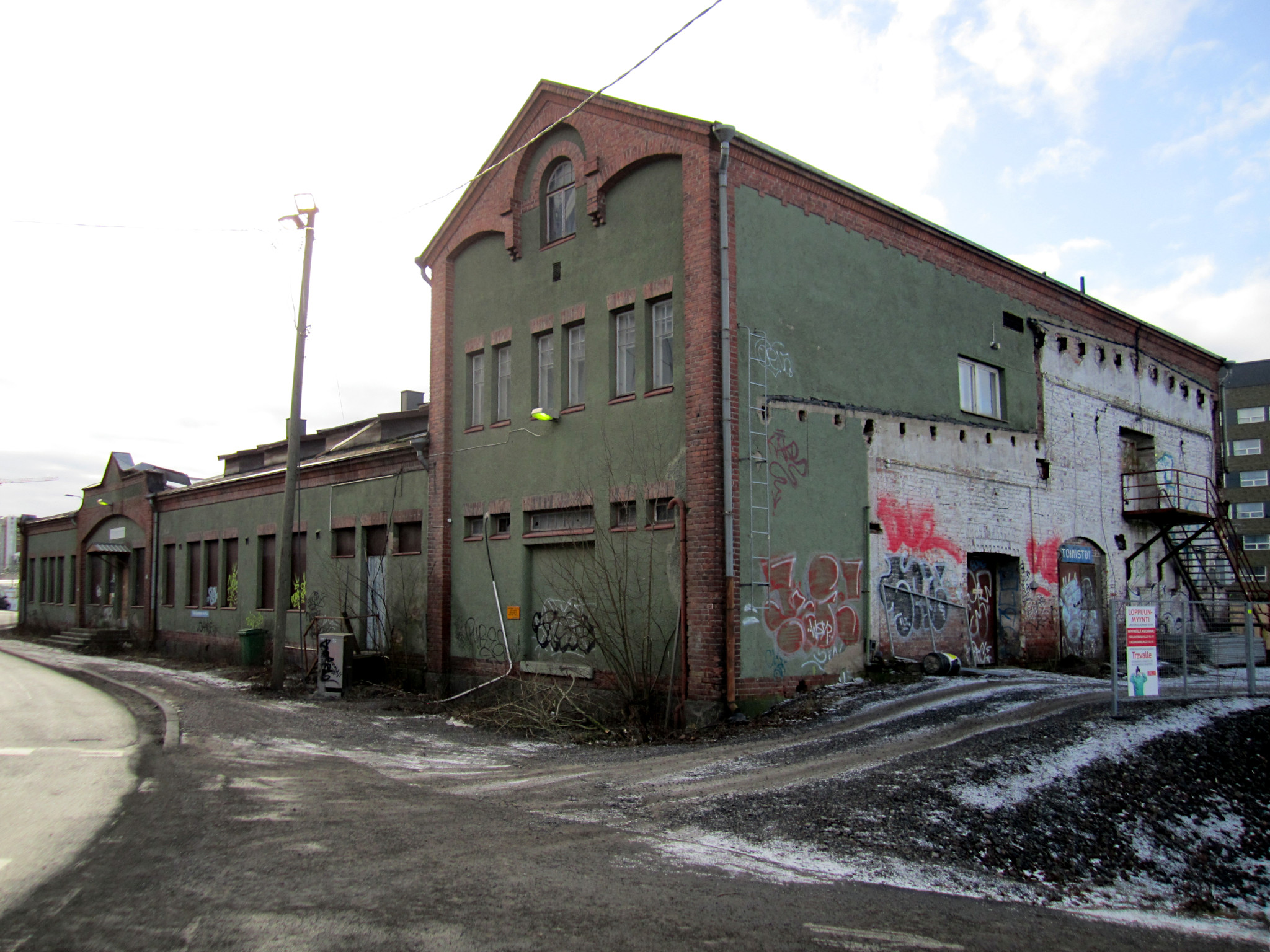
Old freight depot building in Tampere, Finland before relocation in 2020

Goods stations may be located:

- next to a passenger station (either on the far side of the platforms as seen from the station building or immediately alongside it),
- separately from the associated passenger station on one of the railway lines leading from it,
- as an independent facility not connected with any particular passenger station.

Where individual goods wagons are dispatched to specific goods stations, they are usually delivered to special shunting stations or marshalling yards where they are sorted and then collected. Sometimes there are combined shunting and goods stations.

== Equipment ==
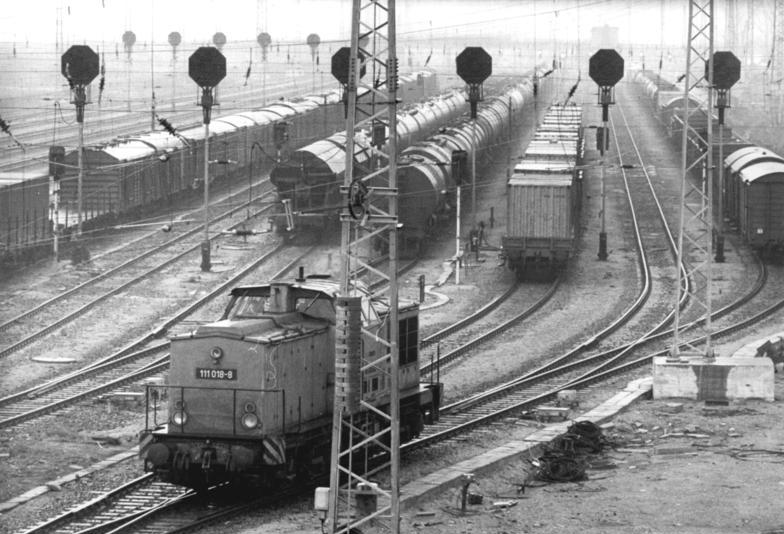
Goods station with fan of sidings and hump signals at Rostock, East Germany, 1986

A goods station is usually equipped with a large number of storage and loading sidings in order to fulfil its task. On the loading sidings there may be fixed facilities, such as cranes or conveyor belts, or temporary equipment, such as wheeled ramps for the loading of sugar beet.

Stations where the primary purpose of the station is the handling of containers are also known as container terminals (CT). They are equipped with special cranes and fork-lift vehicles for loading containers from lorries or ships onto the railway vehicles, or vice versa.

If only a small section of a station is used for the loading and unloading of goods, it may be referred to as the "loading area" or "loading dock" and has its own access and signposting. Often there are no facilities for loading and the individual firm has to organise its own loading equipment such as conveyor belts or lorry cranes.

Such loading areas were mainly to be found on branch lines, narrow gauge railways and at smaller stations.

Medium-sized and larger goods stations usually have marshalling or shunting sidings to enable trains to be divided amongst the various local loading and sorting sidings and industrial branches, at the same time performing the function of a small railway hub. In many European countries they are also equipped with a hump yard.

== Changing nature of goods stations ==
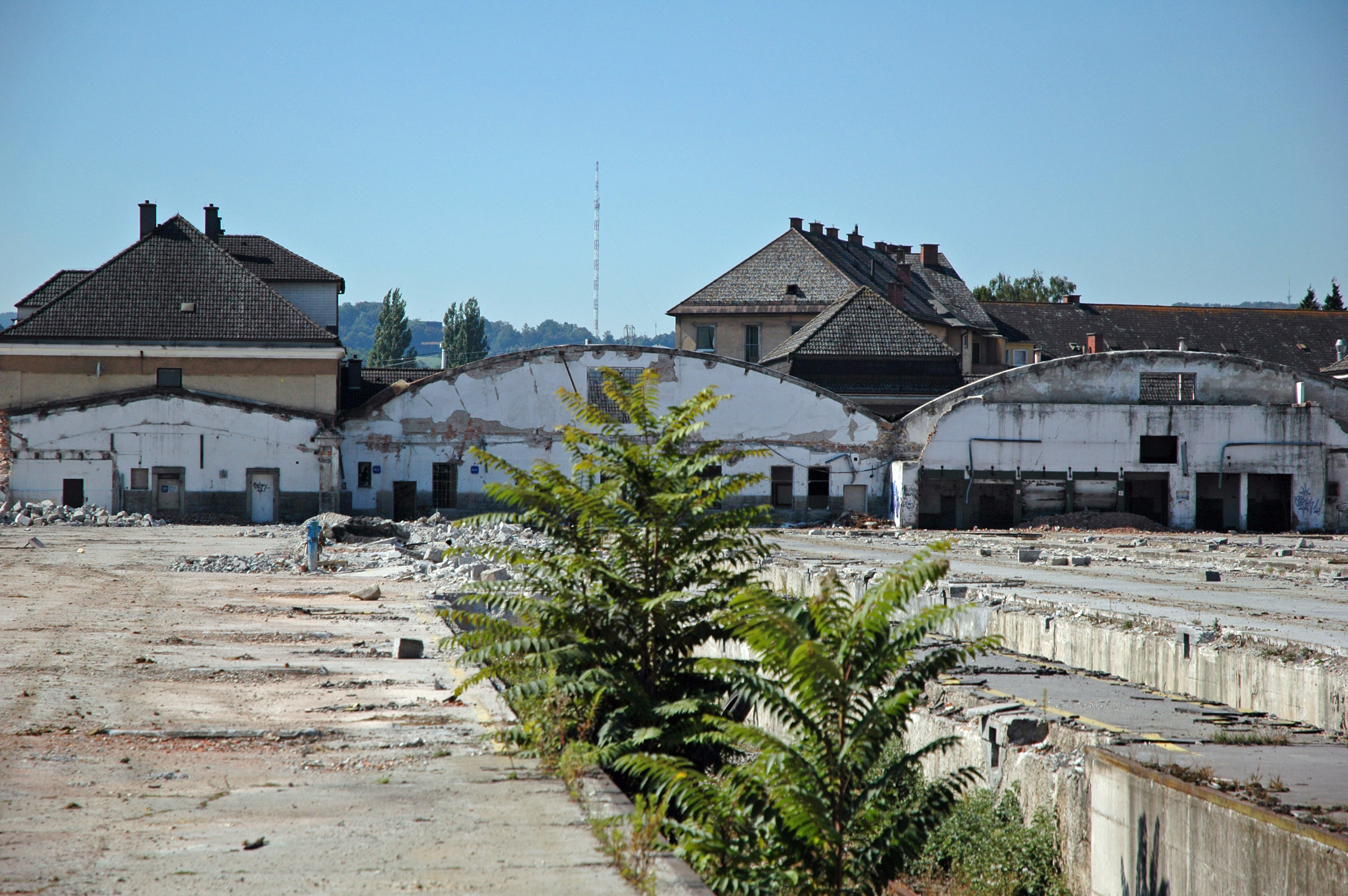
Former goods station at Linz, Austria, shortly before its demolition (circa 2006)

Due to the increasing amount of goods traffic that has switched from rail to road many goods stations and, in consequence marshalling yards, closed and were often eventually demolished, so that reviving rail services at the same location is no longer possible. In combined goods and hub stations with a hump yard, the latter was closed if the station lost its role as a railway hub, whilst the local goods function was retained. In addition, in most countries, part-load or parcel goods services have been entirely transferred to the roads, which has led to the closure of goods sheds as well as most of the public loading sidings and ramps used by smaller customers. As a result, most of the remaining goods stations today are just used as container or transshipment stations.

== European terminology ==
In German-speaking countries, various terms for goods station are used including Güterbahnhof in Germany (abb: Gbf) and Switzerland (abb: GB), Frachtenbahnhof (Fbf) in Austria; Umschlagbahnhof (Ubf) for transshipment station and Containerbahnhof or Containerterminal (CT) for container station or terminal.

In French : gare aux marchandises or gare de fret.

== See also ==
- Container terminal
- Freight house
- Freight yard
- Goods shed
- Goods train
- Train station, which includes information on passenger stations.
- Warehouse
