= Edge Hill railway station =

Railway station in Merseyside, England

Edge Hill
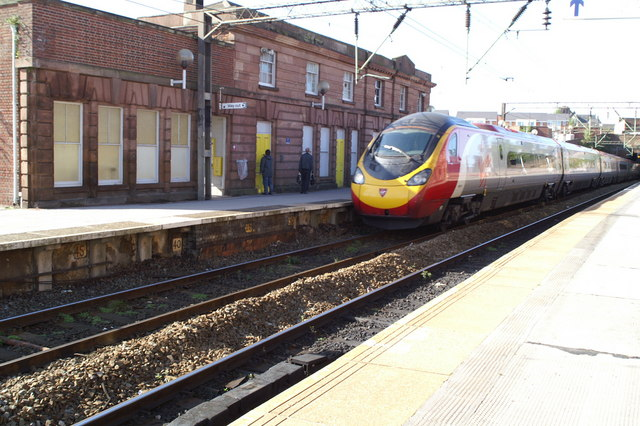

General information
- Location: Edge Hill, Liverpool, England
- Coordinates: 53°24′09″N 2°56′47″W
- Grid reference: SJ371899
- Manager: Northern Trains
- Transit authority: Merseytravel
- Platforms: 4

Other information
- Station code: EDG
- Fare zone: C1
- Classification: DfT category E

Key dates
- 1836: Opened

Passengers
- 2021/22: ▲0.162 million
- Interchange: ▲6,299
- 2022/23: ▲0.176 million
- Interchange: ▼5,970
- 2023/24: ▲0.180 million
- Interchange: ▲6,089
- 2024/25: ▲0.210 million
- Interchange: ▲7,499
- 2025/26: ▲0.237 million
- Interchange: ▼7,498
Location
Notes
- Passenger statistics from the Office of Rail and Road

Edge Hill railway station is serves the district of Edge Hill, in Liverpool, Merseyside, England; it is one of the oldest railway stations in the world. There have been two stations of that name; the first stood a short distance south-west of the present station and its remains are still visible, although the site is not open to the public. Edge Hill is the first station after departure from Liverpool Lime Street. The station, and all trains serving it, is operated by Northern Trains. Other services by Avanti West Coast, East Midlands Railway, TransPennine Express and West Midlands Trains pass through the station.

== History ==
The first station opened on 15 September 1830, as part of the Liverpool and Manchester Railway. It was located in a 22 yd (20 m) wide by 68 yd (62 m) long and 40 ft (12 m) deep sandstone cutting, with three tunnels at the west end.

As early as May 1831, the railway's directors had concluded that Crown Street station was too far removed from the centre of Liverpool, so they commissioned a survey to be made with a view to finding a way of bringing the railway into the town. George Stephenson produced a plan in June 1831 to provide a line, mainly in a tunnel, from Edge Hill to the cattle market at Haymarket. Liverpool Common Council approved the scheme subject to it being restricted to passengers only and plans were drawn up in October 1831 for submission to Parliament. The Bill received Royal Assent on 23 May 1832, tenders were let and work started in 1833.

Parliament had forbidden locomotives to run through tunnels and the railway had therefore to build stationary engines at the top of the incline up from Lime Street. The decision to extend the railway to Lime Street station required the construction of a new station at Edge Hill, situated to the north of the old station so that it was on the new line at the tunnel portal. Plans were approved in December 1834, and a contract for the construction of the new station and engine houses was let in March 1835. The new station was about 500 ft (150 m) by 100 ft (30 m) in area with stone platforms with all the station buildings set back from the platform edges.

Trains descended to Lime Street by gravity under the control of two brakesmen riding in an open brake waggon, being rope-hauled by a winding engine back up to Edge Hill. This system, constructed by Mather, Dixon and Company under the direction of John Grantham, ended in 1870.

The new Edge Hill station was opened in 1836 and has been in continuous use ever since.

Sidings to the north of the station (Note: Sometimes called Exhibition Road, after the adjacent thoroughfare leading to the exhibition hall) served as a terminus for excursionists visiting the 1886 Shipperies and 1887 Royal Jubilee Exhibitions.

The venue on Edge Lane had its own sidings to the south, including access to the building itself, for delivery of exhibits and removal of materials when the site closed.

=== Incidents ===
- 8 March 1906, shunt horse driver John Short, was injured after wagons being pulled by horses detached, catching him between the horses and the wagons.

=== Renovation in 2009 ===
In 2009, arts organisation Metal completed a major renovation of the Engine House, Boiler Room and Accumulator Tower at Edge Hill station, after successfully raising capital funding from Kensington Regeneration, Merseytravel, Northern Rail, Railway Heritage Trust and Network Rail. This included works by Al and Al, entitled XXX: Get Off At Edge Hill.

== Layout ==
Facing west there are two tunnels visible from the platforms: the northernmost is the Waterloo Tunnel and the southern leads to Liverpool Lime Street. The station consists of two island platforms, each with an original building dating from 1836. This makes it one of the world's oldest passenger railway stations still in use, although the Manchester Liverpool Road is the oldest surviving station building. Art exhibitions are held on the approach road to the southern island platform. The Metal arts centre now occupies part of the building on the Manchester-bound platform.

Around 400 yards (370 m) (Note: Seen on signs at LE junction.) from the station in the Manchester direction is a key junction, where the Merseytravel City lines separate into two: one goes towards Mossley Hill (Note: Serving the southern Liverpool-Manchester line and the West Coast Main Line.) and the other towards Wavertree Technology Park (Note: This serves the Wigan and Manchester Victoria lines.) The Canada Dock Branch line runs through the station towards Bootle Oriel Road. There is also a carriage servicing depot, just to the east of the junction on the line towards Mossley Hill, which is used by Alstom to maintain train operator Virgin West Coast's Pendolino fleet.

The station buildings are Grade II listed. Network Rail applied for planning permission in November 2016 to update the ticket desk and counter to make it more accessible to passengers with disabilities.

The ticket office, on the northern island platform, is staffed throughout the day (05:30–00:10, Monday–Saturday). Whilst electronic ticket machines are present, in January 2021 customer information screens were installed and commissioned providing customers with train running information for all four platforms, which are linked by a subway. The buildings on platforms 3 and 4 are no longer in use by the railway, but are used by Metal Culture for Art studios. Step-free access is available to platforms 1 and 2 only, as the subway to the other platforms has stairs.

== Services ==
Edge Hill lies on both routes of the Liverpool to Manchester Line from Liverpool Lime Street. Northern Trains operates the following general off-peak service, in trains per hour (tph):

- 4 tph to Liverpool Lime Street
- 2 tph to Wigan North Western, via St Helens Central
- 1 tph to Manchester Airport on the northern branch, via Manchester Piccadilly
- 1 tph to Manchester Oxford Road on the southern branch via Warrington Central.

Preceding station	National Rail	Following station
Liverpool Lime Street	Northern Trains Liverpool–Wigan line	Wavertree Technology Park
Liverpool Lime Street	Northern Trains Liverpool Lime Street to Manchester Airport via Chat Moss	Wavertree Technology Park
Liverpool Lime Street	Northern Trains Liverpool Lime Street to Manchester Oxford Road via Warrington Central	Mossley Hill
	Historical railways	
Liverpool Lime Street; Line and station open	London and North Western Railway; St Helens and Runcorn Gap Railway	Wavertree; Line open, station closed

== Gallery ==
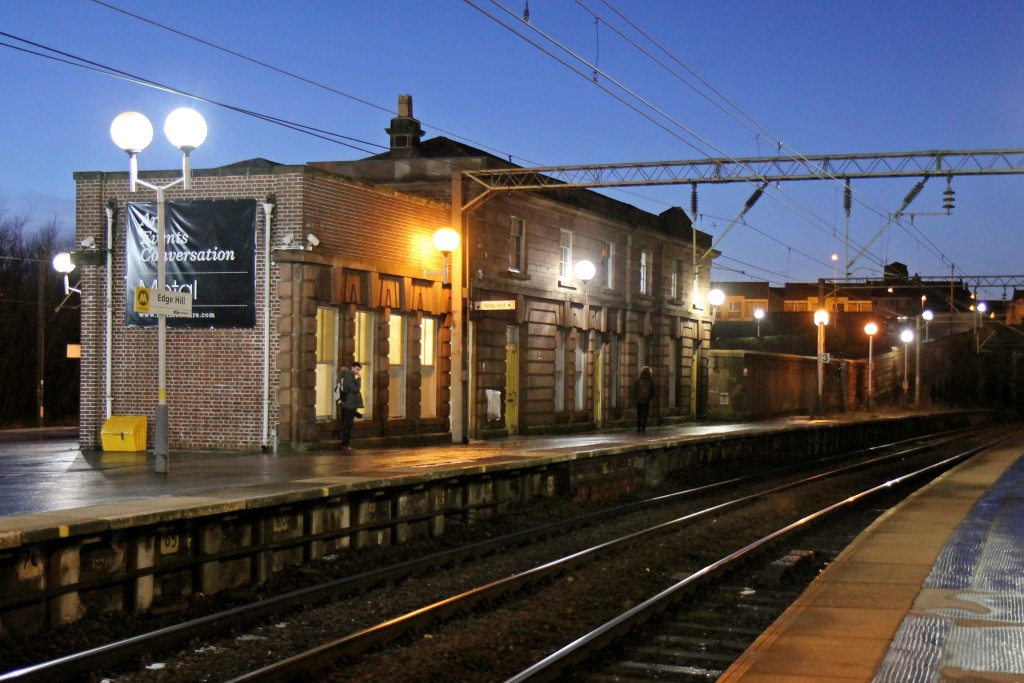
The station buildings

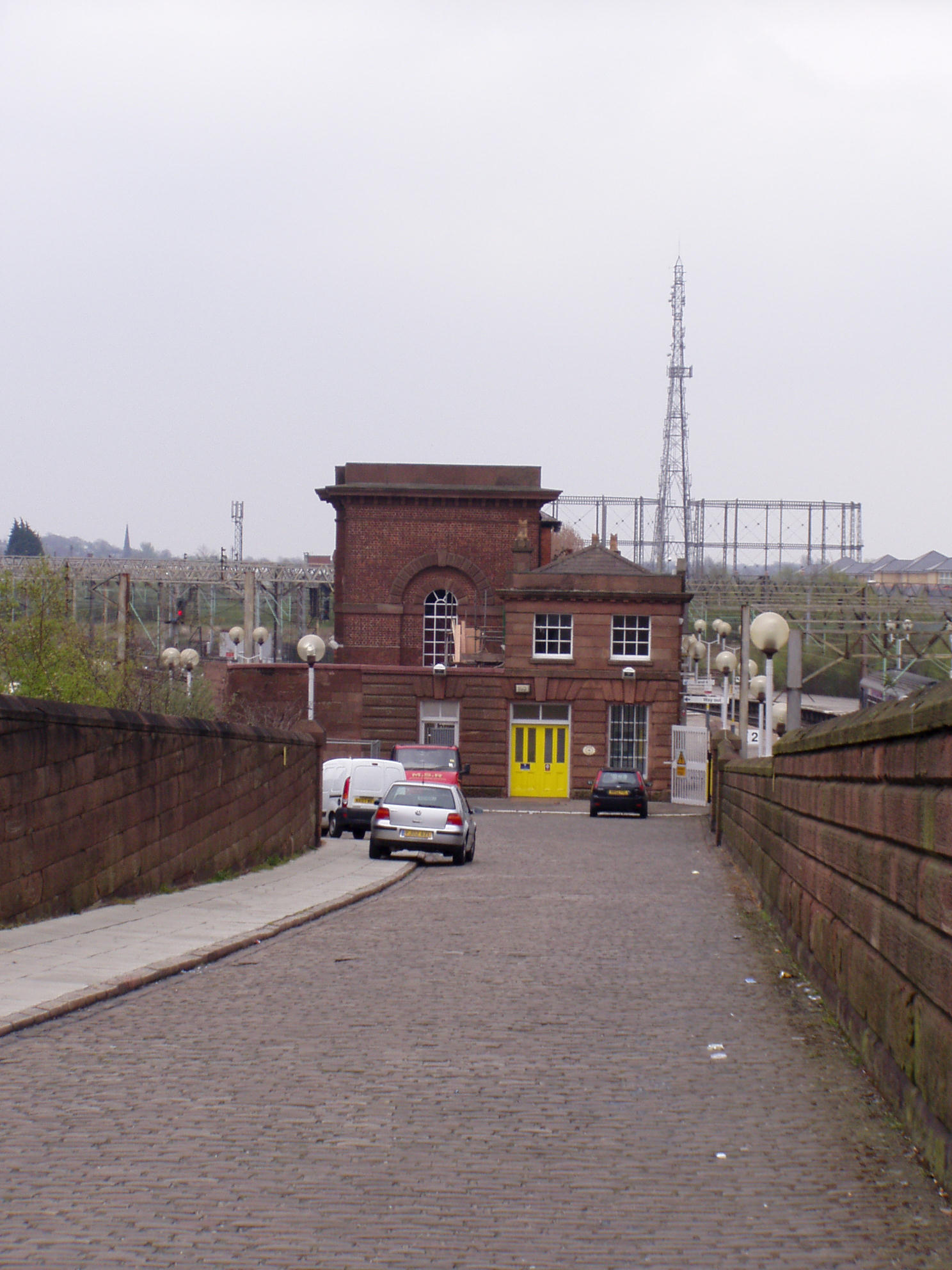
The station entrance

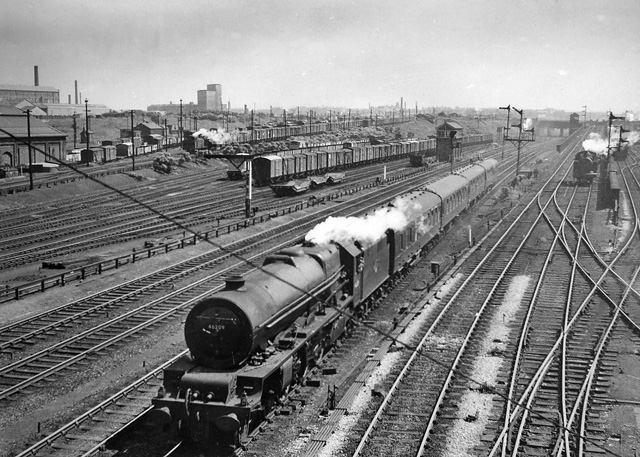
Edge Hill goods yards in 1959

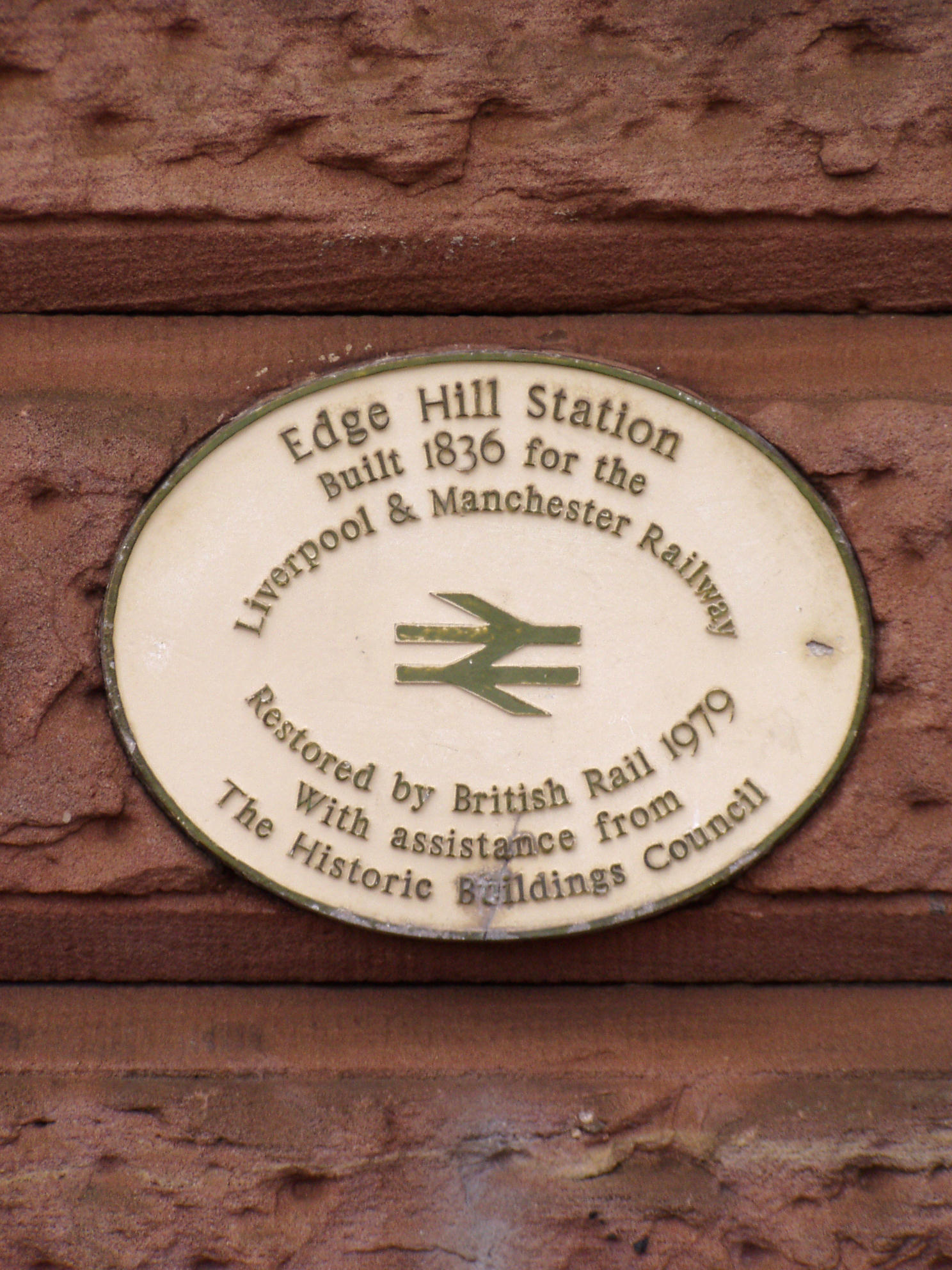
The 1979 station restoration plaque.
