= Huyton =

Town in Merseyside, England

Coordinates: 53°24′40″N 2°50′25″W

- Town
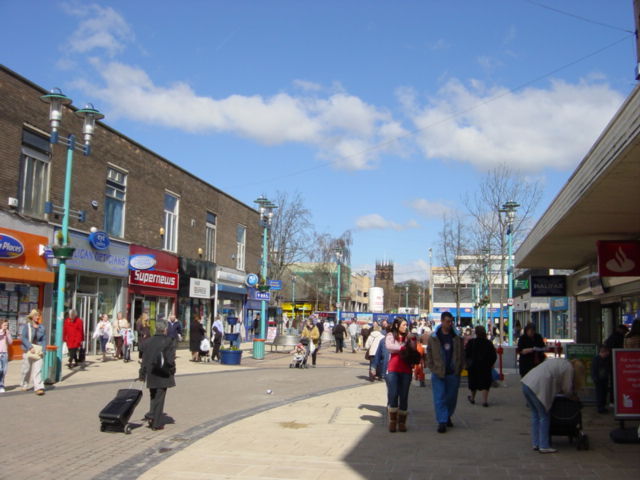
- Huyton Village

- Location within Merseyside
- Population: 33,193 (Office for National Statistics)
- OS grid reference: SJ4692
- Metropolitan borough: Knowsley
- Metropolitan county: Merseyside
- Region: North West
- Country: England
- Sovereign state: United Kingdom
- Post town: LIVERPOOL
- Postcode district: L11, L14, L36
- Dialling code: 0151
- Police: Merseyside
- Fire: Merseyside
- Ambulance: North West
- UK Parliament: Knowsley

Huyton (/ˈhaɪtən/ HY-tən) is a town in the Metropolitan Borough of Knowsley, Merseyside, England. Part of the Liverpool Built-up Area, it borders the Liverpool suburbs of Dovecot, Knotty Ash and Netherley.

Historically in Lancashire, Huyton was an ancient parish which in the mid-19th century contained Croxteth Park, Knowsley and Tarbock. It was part of the hundred of West Derby, an ancient subdivision of Lancashire covering the south-west of the county.

== History ==
=== Medieval ===
Huyton was first settled about 600–650 AD by Angles. The settlement was founded on a low hill surrounded by inaccessible marshy land. The first part of the name may suggest a landing-place, probably on the banks of the River Alt.

Both Huyton and Roby are mentioned in the Domesday Book of 1086, Huyton being spelt Hitune.

=== Industrial development ===
Huyton-with-Roby is situated near to the south-western extremity of the former Lancashire coalfield. In the 19th century, Welsh workers settled in the area to work in nearby collieries. A Welsh-speaking Non-conformist chapel (Calvinistic Methodists) was founded in Wood Lane, Huyton Quarry. Nearby Cronton Colliery ceased production in March 1984, shortly before the UK miners' strike (1984–1985). Both Huyton and Roby have stations on the Liverpool and Manchester Railway (another station, Huyton Quarry, closed in 1958). The railway's construction was supervised by George Stephenson and, when it opened in 1830, it became the world's first scheduled passenger train service. On the day of the railway's official opening, Arthur Wellesley, 1st Duke of Wellington alighted the train at Roby station.

=== Second World War ===
During WW2, Huyton suffered bombing from the Luftwaffe but the scale of destruction was far less than that experienced in Liverpool, Bootle, and Birkenhead. Schoolchildren were not evacuated from Huyton, instead schools and homes were provided with air-raid shelters.

Huyton hosted three wartime camps: an internment camp, a prisoner-of-war camp, and a base for American servicemen. The internment camp may have been one of the largest in the UK. Some internees were refugees from the Nazis, including socialists such as Kurt Hager and a large number of artists attacked in Germany and elsewhere for their "degeneracy". Huyton internees included artists Martin Bloch, Hugo Dachinger, and Walter Nessler, dancer Kurt Jooss, musicians, sociologist Norbert Elias, anthropologist Eric Wolf and composer Hans Gál. More than 40 per cent of Huyton's internees were over 50 years old. The camp, first occupied in May 1940, was formed around several streets of new, empty council houses and flats and then made secure with barbed wire fencing. Twelve internees were allocated to each house, but overcrowding resulted in many sleeping in tents.

Initially, the camp was only meant to hold the internees until they could be shipped to the Isle of Man. However, largely in response to the torpedoing of the transport ship, Arandora Star (and the loss of 805 lives, including the Captain, 12 of his officers, 42 of his crew and 37 military guards), the deportations ended. Most of the internees were released before the camp closed in 1942. The camp was sited in and around what became known as the "Bluebell Estate" and many of the streets were given names of the great battles of WWII.

The prisoner of war camp closed in 1948. Some inmates "went native", stayed in Britain and married local women. Among those in the Huyton camp was Bert Trautmann, who later went on to be the 1950s goalkeeper for Manchester City. From 1944, American servicemen were temporarily stationed in Huyton.

=== Crime ===
==== Murders ====
Huyton was brought to national attention in 2005 after the racially motivated murder of black teenager Anthony Walker in McGoldrick Park. Two local youths were later found guilty of his murder and sentenced to life imprisonment. They were 17-year-old Michael Barton (brother of footballer Joey Barton) and 20-year-old Paul Taylor.

In July 2008, an 18-year-old teenager Michael Causer was battered to death in a homophobic attack at a house in Huyton.

==== Organised crime ====
The Huyton Firm, also known as the Cantril Farm Cartel, is an organized crime group based in the Huyton area.

Founded in the 1990s, the gang has been involved in large-scale drug trafficking, blackmail, contract killing and violent crime. The gang rose to prominence by filling a power vacuum left by other notorious Liverpool criminals, such as Curtis Warren and Colin "Smigger" Smith, after their arrests and deaths.

Over three decades, the Huyton Firm became one of the most powerful and secretive UK crime organizations, with significant international connections.

== Governance ==
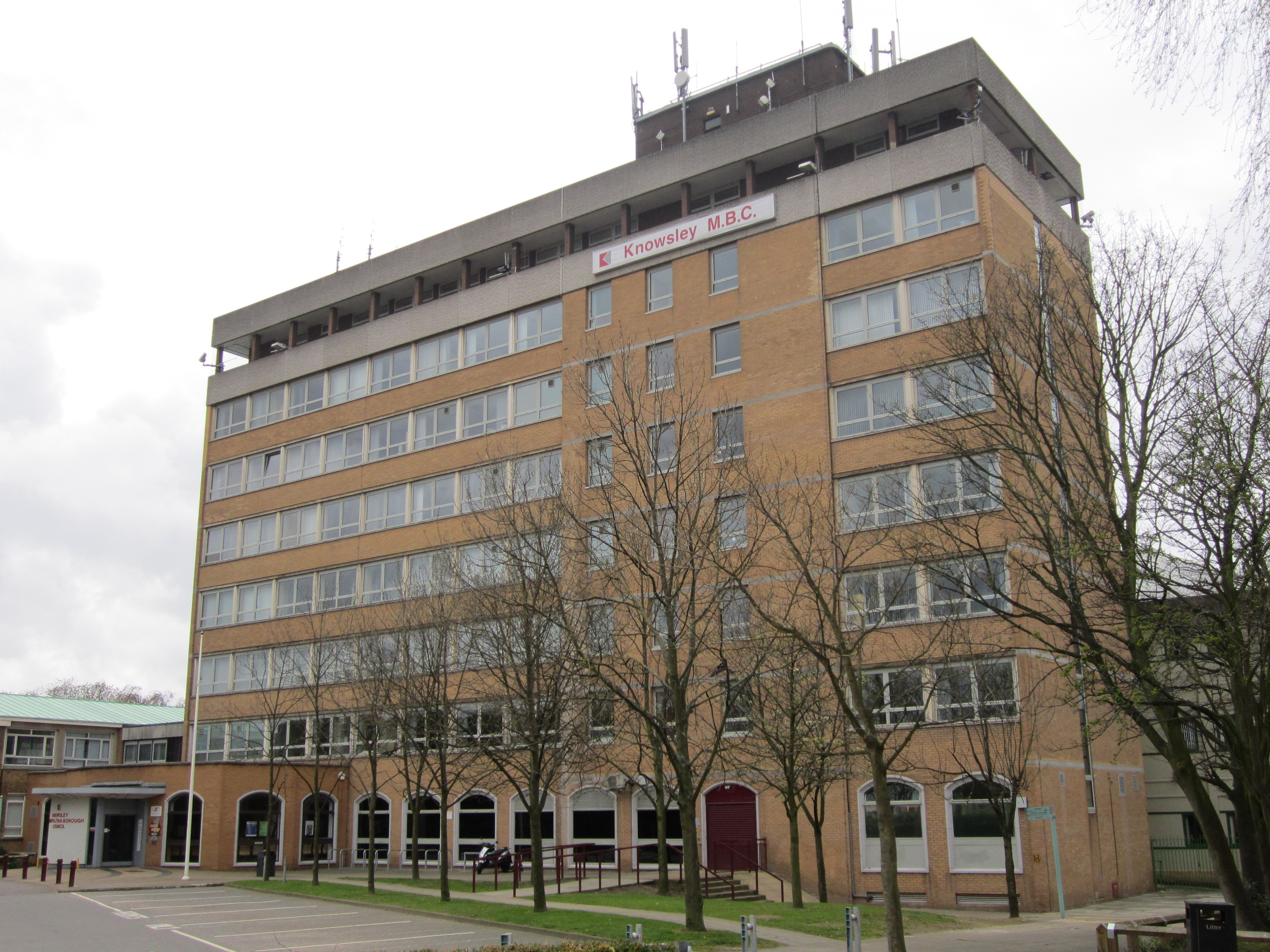
Huyton Municipal Building

In 1894, the township was included in the Huyton with Roby Urban District. "Since the First World War, Huyton-with-Roby has been transformed into a residential suburb of Liverpool, while agriculture, formerly the area's main occupation, has almost disappeared". In 1932 Liverpool City Council purchased a large area of the Earl of Derby's Knowsley estate. Thereafter, throughout the 1930s, the city built four large housing estates in the north-west of Huyton-with-Roby. These Liverpool ‘overspill' housing estates were Fincham, Huyton Farm, Longview and Woolfall Heath. Other smaller developments were commissioned by the urban district council or privately commissioned. By 1950 the population was over 55,000, the vast majority of whom had moved to the area from the city of Liverpool.

After the Second World War, the district successfully fought off absorption into the Liverpool City Council boundaries. However, its application for borough status failed in 1952. Huyton Municipal Building was completed in 1963.

On 1 April 1974, Huyton-with-Roby became part of the new metropolitan borough of Knowsley.

By convention, Huyton-with-Roby contains Huyton Park, Roby, Longview, Huyton Quarry, Page Moss, Woolfall Heath, Bowring Park, Fincham, and Court Hey. Today this area is covered by six local government wards: Stockbridge, Page Moss, Roby, St. Gabriel's, St. Michael's, and Swanside. Stockbridge ward includes Longview (in Huyton) as well as Stockbridge Village (outside Huyton).

== Transport ==
Huyton is located just west of the M57 motorway which marks its border. Liverpool city centre is 6 miles (9.7 km) to the west via the M62 motorway.

There are three surrounding motorway junctions (M57 J2, M62 J5 and J6) making Huyton very easily accessed via road.

=== Huyton railway station ===
Huyton railway station, formerly called Huyton Gate, is served by regular City Line services to and from Liverpool, St. Helens, Wigan and further afield.

=== Huyton bus station ===
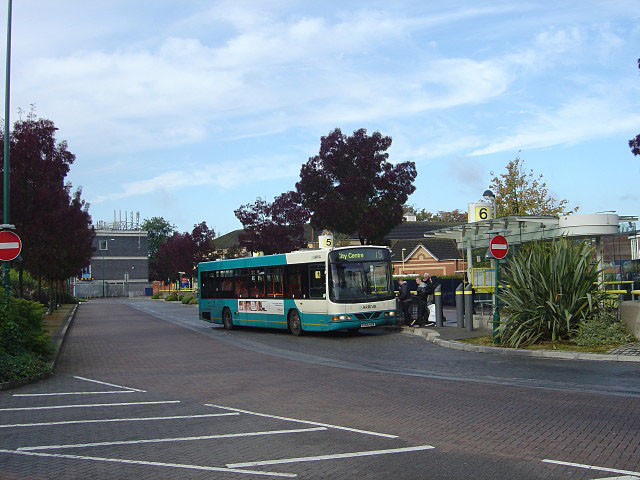
Huyton bus station

Huyton bus station is on Huyton Hey Road, adjacent to the shopping centre and 140 metres away from the Huyton railway station.

Buses from Huyton bus station serve destinations as far afield as Liverpool, Kirkby, St. Helens, Warrington, Runcorn and Liverpool John Lennon Airport.

== Education ==
Huyton has one secondary school—Lord Derby Academy on Seel Road—and fifteen primary schools. A construction training college is on Princess Drive.

== Amenities ==
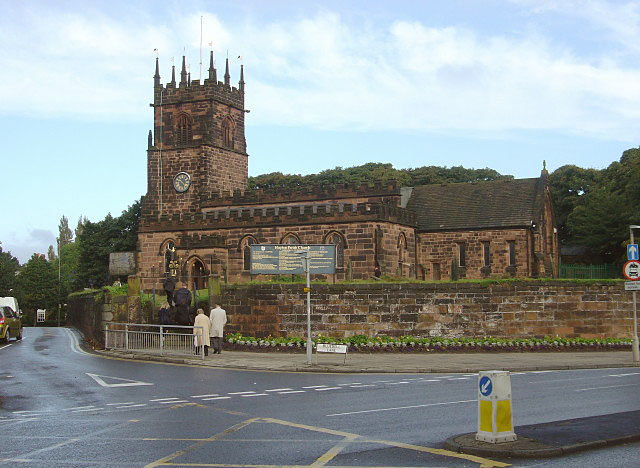
Huyton Parish Church of St Michael

The shopping centre of Huyton is still referred to by local people as "the village" or "the villie", which dates back to the days when the centre was a rural village community. An Asda complex has been built nearby. There are also around 100 other independent shops and previously hosted an indoor market, which has since been closed.

The area is host to Huyton Library (Civic Way) and before 2014 was also served by Page Moss Library (Stockbridge Lane). There is also a contemporary art gallery at Huyton Library.

There are eight public parks: Court Hey Park, Bowring Park (the oldest public park in Knowsley, opened in 1907), Huyton Lane Wetland, Jubilee Park (Twig Lane/Dinas Lane), McGoldrick Park (Rydal Road), Sawpit Park (Hall Lane/Sawpit Lane), Stadt Moers Park (covers more than 220 acres (0.89 km^{2}) of land between Whiston and Huyton) and St. John's Millennium Green (Manor Farm Road). There are also nine children's playgrounds.

Huyton has a King George's Field in memorial to King George V. It also has one of the biggest dogs' homes in Merseyside, Dogs' Trust, located on Whiston Lane.

Huyton has many public houses including The Huyton Park Hotel, The Stanley Arms (named after Frederick Stanley, 16th Earl of Derby), The Crofters, Seel Arms, Queens Arms, Oak Tree, The Old Bank, Longview Social Club and The Swan. The former Wheatsheaf/Rose And Crown reopened as The Barker's Brewery on 23 January 2011, as part of the Wetherspoon chain of pubs. Several former landmark pubs have been demolished for new projects since the late 1990s: The Dovecot, Bluebell Inn, Farmers Arms, Hillside, Eagle and Child, The Quarry Inn and The Quiet Man.

In January 2012, the Longview Social Club was destroyed by a fire on the premises.

In the early hours of 16 April 2015, four supermarkets at Longview Shops were destroyed by fire and later demolished due to extensive damage. The fire started at a One Stop store and spread across another three businesses. Merseyside Police later revealed the blaze was caused by an attempted burglary.

== Sport ==
The area is served by Knowsley Leisure and Culture Park (Longview Drive) and King George V Sports Centre (Longview Lane).

Huyton-with-Roby has two 18-hole golf courses: Huyton & Prescot Golf Club (founded in 1905) and Bowring Golf Club (according to a sign at the course, the oldest municipal golf course in England).

Huyton has its own cricket club, located off Huyton Lane which was founded in the mid-1860s by the Stone family and the town has produced at least one first class cricketer: Reginald Moss.

Huyton also had a professional rugby league club from 1968 to 1985. It was formed from Liverpool Stanley (1934–1951) and Liverpool City (1951–1968). Huyton RLFC struggled in the second division of the Rugby Football League until 1985 when they were replaced by Runcorn Highfield. This club, later renamed Highfield, struggled on near the bottom of the pro game: in 1995–1996 they gained just one point all season and changed their name to Prescot Panthers, before folding at the end of the 1997 season. (Huytonians still interested in supporting pro rugby league have the choice of either St. Helens or Widnes Vikings, both of whom are 6 miles (9.7 km) away from Huyton).

In football, the town has produced the England midfield internationals Peter Reid (Everton) and Steven Gerrard (Liverpool). Other footballers include Craig Hignett, Tony Hibbert, David Nugent, Lee Molyneux, Leon Osman, John Relish, Greg Tansey, Lee Trundle, Callum McManaman and Cole Stockton. On 28 March 2007, two of Huyton's most prominent footballers starred for England in a 3–0 away win in Andorra. Goals came from Steven Gerrard (2) and David Nugent. Both players were educated at Cardinal Heenan High School.

Huyton has many amateur football teams at both junior and senior level, but only one FA Charter Standard Club, Paramount Community Football Club.

Despite producing so many pro footballers, Huyton has never been able to sustain a semi-pro club for long. Nearby Kirkby Town changed their name to Knowsley United in 1988 and moved to Alt Park, the former home of Huyton Rugby league Club. In United's first five seasons they were successful. In 1988–89 they finished runners-up in the North West Counties Football League. The following season they were champions and won promotion to the Northern Premier League Division One. They were accordingly promoted to the Premier Division. The following season they reached the first round proper of the FA Cup, only to be beaten by Carlisle United at home. The momentum did not last and Knowsley United ceased to be a senior semi-pro side in 1998.

Huytonians wishing to support a local semi-pro outfit have Prescot Cables located at Valerie Park in the Northern Premier League (Premier Division) less than 2 miles (3.2 km) away.

== Notable people ==
Huyton-with-Roby has several Beatles connections. As The Quarrymen, the Fab Four played the MPTE Social Club in Finch Lane. The Beatles also played 15 times in a hall in Page Moss (Hambleton Hall, St David Road; later became a Probation Office) between January 1961 and January 1962. On 21 March 1961, The Swinging Blue Jeans, fronted by Huyton-born Ray Ennis (born Raymond Vincent Ennis on 26 May 1942), introduced the Beatles to their first-ever Cavern Club evening slot. Paul McCartney's aunt Jin lived in Dinas Lane. In 1963, this was the site of McCartney's eventful 21st birthday party, at which John Lennon got drunk and assaulted a local DJ for insinuating he was a homosexual. Huyton Parish Church churchyard is the final resting place of the Beatles' original bass guitarist, Huytonian Stuart Sutcliffe. The Harrogate physician Wilfrid Edgecombe was born in Huyton.

=== Notable music ===
- Black – 7 UK Top 70 singles between 1986 and 1991 including 'Wonderful Life' (No.8).
- The Crescent – 3 UK Top 70 singles between May 2002 and Sept. 2002 including 'On The Run' (No.49).
- The La's – 4 UK Top 70 singles between 1990 and 1997 including 'There She Goes' (No.13).
- Space – 8 UK Top 30 hit singles between 1996 and 1998 including 'Avenging Angels' (No.6).

=== List of notable people ===
- Joey Barton, footballer.
- Although born in St Helens, Sir Thomas Beecham (1879–1961), the classical music conductor, was brought up in the Blacklow Brow area of Huyton. In 1947 he founded the Royal Philharmonic Orchestra.
- Alan Bleasdale, playwright known for Boys from the Blackstuff, attended St. Aloysius RC Infant and Junior Schools, Huyton, 1951–1957.
- Stan Boardman, comedian.
- Henry Brunner, chemist, who co-founded Brunner Mond, later part of ICI. Resident in Huyton until his death.
- John Christopher, novelist.
- Peter Culshaw: Professional boxer, former world WBU and Commonwealth flyweight champion.
- Carol Decker, rock singer.
- Alicya Eyo, actress.
- Rebecca Ferguson, singer.
- Edward Fieldwick, cricketer.
- Steven Gerrard, former England national football team midfielder who played for clubs including Liverpool F.C.
- Sir Rex Harrison, actor who starred in films such as My Fair Lady and Cleopatra, was born and brought up on Tarbock Road in Huyton, and attended St Gabriel's School.
- Tony Hibbert, footballer.
- Clint Hill footballer.
- Paul Lewis, pianist.
- Chris Long, footballer.
- Lee Mavers, frontman of band The La's.
- John McCabe, composer.
- Callum McManaman, footballer.
- Sally Morgan, Baroness Morgan of Huyton, politician.
- Reginald Moss, cricketer.
- Matthew Murphy, guitarist / lead vocals of The Wombats
- Although originally from Manchester, Peter Noone (born 1947), of 1960s group Herman's Hermits, settled in Chestnut Avenue, Huyton, before becoming famous.
- David Nugent, footballer.
- Paddy Pimblett, mixed martial artist
- Barbara Pym, novelist who was privately educated at Huyton College.
- Rain, early 1990s band from Huyton.
- Phil Redmond, the creator of Hollyoaks, Grange Hill and Brookside.
- Peter Reid, former England national football team midfielder who played for clubs including Everton and has since worked in management for clubs including Manchester City and Sunderland.
- Tony Schumacher, author and broadcaster.
- Paul Simpson (musician)
- Freddie Starr, comedian.
- Cole Stockton, footballer.
- Stuart Sutcliffe, the fifth Beatle.
- Lee Trundle, footballer.
- Harold Wilson, former Labour prime minister (1964–70 & 1974–76) was the member of parliament (MP) for the former Huyton constituency 1950–83. A statue of Wilson was erected in Huyton town centre in 2006, 11 years after his death.

== TV and radio ==
The Boys from the Blackstuff episode "Jobs for the Boys" was partly filmed in Woodlands Road, Roby.

Huyton is also home to 99.8FM KCC Live, a radio station based at Knowsley Community College in Stockbridge Village. Founded in December 2003, it can be found on the 99.8 FM radio frequency.

== See also ==
- Listed buildings in Huyton with Roby
