= Roby, Merseyside =

Coordinates: 53.413°N 2.852°W

Roby
- Village
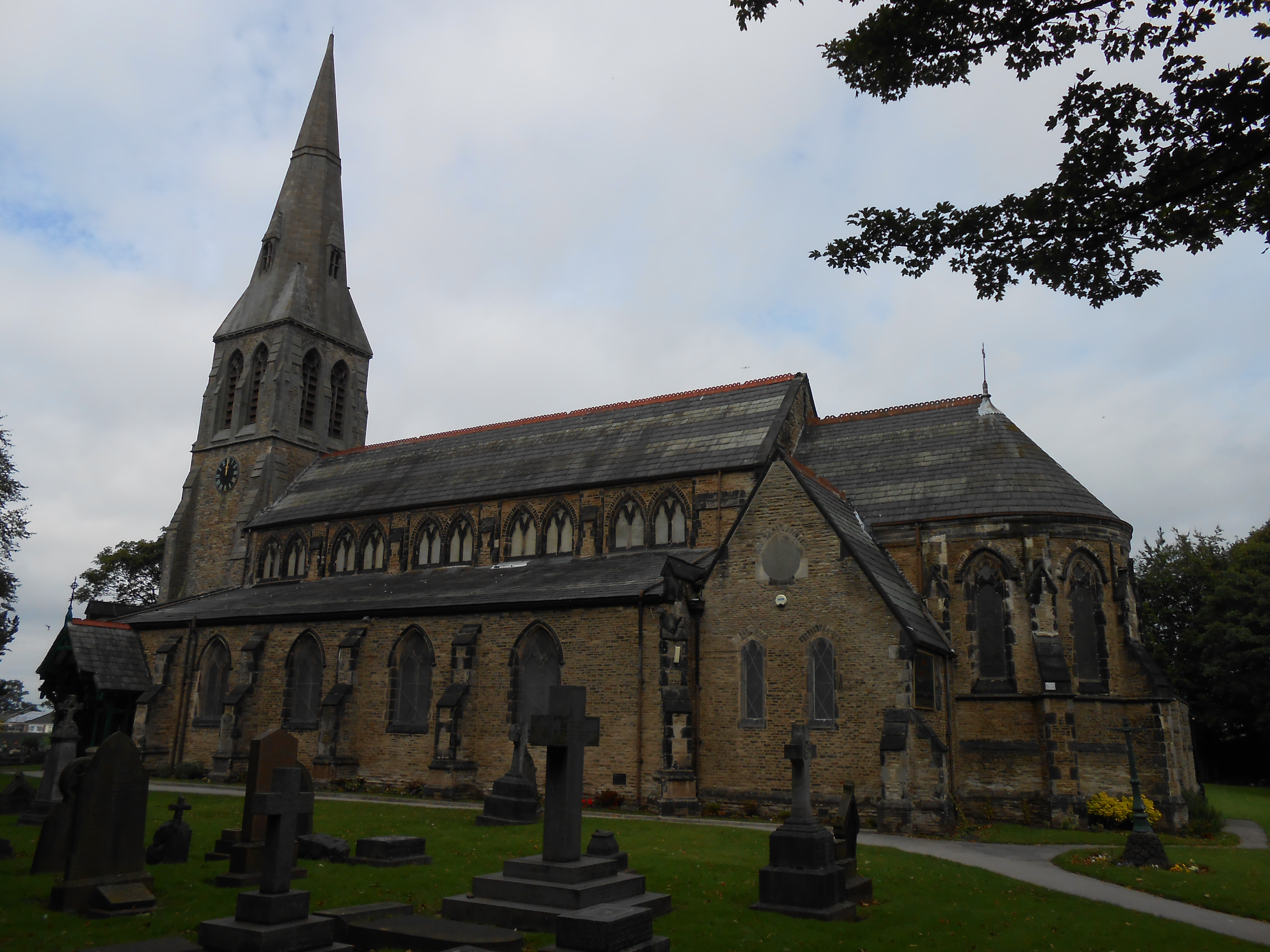
- St. Bartholomew's Church, Roby

- Location within Merseyside
- Population: 7,254 (2011 Census)
- OS grid reference: SJ435905
- Metropolitan borough: Knowsley
- Metropolitan county: Merseyside
- Region: North West
- Country: England
- Sovereign state: United Kingdom
- Post town: LIVERPOOL
- Postcode district: L14, L16, L36
- Dialling code: 0151
- Police: Merseyside
- Fire: Merseyside
- Ambulance: North West
- UK Parliament: Knowsley

Roby is a village and electoral ward in the Metropolitan Borough of Knowsley, Merseyside, England. Part of the wider built-up-area of Huyton with Roby with Huyton, Roby is effectively a dormitory village or suburb of the adjacent City of Liverpool. At the 2021 Census, the population of Roby electoral ward was 9,353.

Historically in Lancashire, Roby was part of the hundred of West Derby, an ancient subdivision of Lancashire covering the south-west of the county, as a broadly rural village and township within the Parish of Huyton. In the 1890's Roby became part of the wider Huyton with Roby Urban District & civil parish.

Growing industrialisation of the region during the industrial revolution brought the Liverpool and Manchester Railway to Roby at the Roby railway station in 1830.

== History ==
Roby grew from a tenth-century Norse settlement named Rabil, meaning "boundary farm/village". Roby is therefore mentioned, as Rabil, in the Domesday Book of 1086. In 1351, it became part of the Barony of Widnes and subsequently merged into the Duchy of Lancaster. In 1894 Roby was included in the Huyton with Roby Urban District. On the abolition of the administrative county of Lancashire in 1974, the urban district was also abolished and its former area was transferred to Merseyside to be combined with that of other districts to form the present-day metropolitan borough of Knowsley.

== Governance ==
Since 1974 the village and ward have been administered by Knowsley Borough Council.

== Geography ==
The area is located within a green belt area of Merseyside and partly consists of detached houses and private roads such as Wynwood Park. It has a golf course situated in nearby Bowring Park by the M62 motorway and Roby Road.

A new instated sign marks Roby by the Bowring Park Golf Course, including Roby Station and Roby Road within its location.

== Transport ==
Roby railway station is situated on the Liverpool City Line, between the stations of Broad Green and Huyton.

== TV and radio ==
- The Boys from the Blackstuff episode "Jobs for the Boys" was part filmed in Woodlands Road, Roby

== See also ==
- Listed buildings in Huyton with Roby
