= WHN =

WHN may refer to:

- WEPN (AM), a New York City radio station which held the call sign WHN from 1922 until 1948, and from 1962 until 1987
- Whiston railway station (National Rail station code), England
- Wuhan railway station, China Railway telegraph code WHN
