= Reginald Moss =

Reginald Moss may refer to:

- Reginald Moss (cricketer) (1868–1956), English cricketer
- Reg Moss (1913–1995), Labour Member of Parliament for Meriden, 1955–1959
