= Listed buildings in Huyton with Roby =

Huyton with Roby is a district in the Metropolitan Borough of Knowsley, Merseyside, England. Formerly the civil parish of Hyton-with-Roby, it contains the settlements of Huyton and Roby. The district contains 26 buildings that are recorded in the National Heritage List for England as designated listed buildings. Of these, one is listed at Grade II*, the middle of the three grades, and the others are at Grade II, the lowest grade.

Originally Huyton and Roby were separate villages that have since been absorbed by urban growth. Most of the listed buildings are country houses that have been altered for other uses, or churches with associated structures. The Liverpool and Manchester Railway was built through the district and four of its bridges are listed. Other listed buildings include two village crosses, one medieval, the other dating from the 19th century, smaller houses, a sports pavilion, and a milestone.

== Key ==
| Grade | Criteria |
|---|---|
| II* | Particularly important buildings of more than special interest |
| II | Buildings of national importance and special interest |

== Buildings ==
| Name and location | Photograph | Date | Notes | Grade |
|---|---|---|---|---|
| Roby Cross; 53.40915°N 2.85617°W | | Medieval | The remains of the cross consist of a stone stump on a square base. There is an information plaque relating to its being moved to this site in 1979. | II |
| St Michael's Church; 53.41399°N 2.84004°W | | 14th century | The oldest parts of the church are the south arcade, the chancel, and the lower part of the tower. A mausoleum was added in 1681 that later became a vestry. The north aisle and arcade date from 1815, and the south aisle from 1822. The tower has pinnacles and an embattled parapet. Inside the church are two fonts, one Norman in style, the other Perpendicular. | II* |
| Huyton Hey; 53.40904°N 2.83077°W | — | Early 18th century | A house, originally a farmhouse, in brick on a stone plinth with a slate roof. It has two storeys with an attic, and a front of two bays. The windows are casements with segmental heads, and the porch is gabled with an elliptical-headed doorway. | II |
| Thingwall Hall; 53.41088°N 2.88794°W | | 18th century | A country house remodelled in about 1846–47 by Harvey Lonsdale Elmes and later used as a residential school. It is stuccoed with a slate roof, and in two storeys with a front of eight. On the front is a Doric porch with an Ionic entablature and pairs of fluted columns, behind which is a round-headed doorway with a fanlight. On the right side is a two-storey canted bay window. | II |
| Stables, The Hazels; 53.42590°N 2.82574°W | — | Mid 18th century | The former stables are in brick with stone dressings and have a hipped slate roof. They are in a U-shaped plan with two storeys, with three bays on the front and two on the sides. The central bay projects forward under a pediment. There are various openings, with pitch holes in the upper storey. | II |
| Milestone; 53.42487°N 2.83025°W | — | c. 1753 | A stone milepost about 1m high. It has an approximately semicircular plan with a slight arris at the front, and stands on a square base. The milestone is inscribed with the distances to Liverpool Exchange on one side and to Prescot and Warrington on the other. | II |
| The Hazels; 53.42578°N 2.82458°W | — | 1764 | Originally a country house, later part of C.F. Mott College. It is in brick with stone dressings and a slate roof. The house is in three storeys, and has a five-bay main front, with a full-width pediment and a secondary three-bay pediment. The porch has angle pilasters and an entablature. Other features include Venetian windows and bay windows. | II |
| Northeast entrance, St Michael's churchyard 53.41385°N 2.83933°W | — | 1765 | Seven semicircular steps lead up to the entrance to the churchyard. It is flanked by square stone Tuscan piers, one of which has a cornice and a ball finial. Between the piers is a wrought iron overthrow with pinnacles and inscribed panels. | II |
| South entrance, St Michael's churchyard 53.41358°N 2.83981°W | — | 1765 | Flanking the entrance to the churchyard are square stone Tuscan piers with cornices and ball finials. Between the piers is a wrought iron overthrow with pinnacles and inscribed panels. | II |
| Monument, St Michael's churchyard 53.41405°N 2.83966°W | — | Early 19th century | The monument is in stone and consists of a pedestal with leaf-and-dart moulding. On the sides are panels with worn inscriptions, and on the angles are pediments and acroteria. On the top is an urn, and the monument is surrounded by cast iron railings. | II |
| Roby Toll House; 53.40926°N 2.85578°W | | Early 19th century | A brick house with stone dressings and a slate roof. It is in one storey with an attic, and has fronts of one and two bays. The short front is gabled and has a bay window incorporating a porch. In the other front the first bay contains a bay window, the second bay is gabled, and the windows are casements. | II |
| Railway Bridge, Archway Road; 53.40965°N 2.84642°W | — | 1828–30 | The bridge was built to carry the Liverpool and Manchester Railway over Archway Road, the engineer for which was George Stephenson. It is in stone and consists of a segmental arch with rusticated voussoirs, a modillioned cornice and a parapet, and is flanked by abutments. | II |
| Railway Bridge, Greystone Road; 53.40806°N 2.88172°W | | 1828–30 | The bridge was built to carry the Liverpool and Manchester Railway over Greystone Road, the engineer for which was George Stephenson. It is in stone, and consists of a round arch with a parapet. The abutments sweep forward to join short round piers with caps. | II |
| Railway Bridge, Pilch Lane East; 53.40990°N 2.86679°W | | 1828–30 | The bridge was built to carry the Liverpool and Manchester Railway over Pilch Lane East, the engineer for which was George Stephenson. It is in stone, and consists of a round arch with a parapet. There is a segmental-arched extension to the south side. | II |
| Railway bridge, Childwall Lane; 53.40965°N 2.84642°W | | 1829–30 | The bridge was built to carry the Liverpool and Manchester Railway over Childwall Lane, the engineer for which was George Stephenson. It is in stone, and consists of a round arch. The abutments sweep forward to join short round piers with caps. | II |
| Hurst House; 53.42207°N 2.82312°W | | c. 1830 | Originally a country house, later used as a golf club house, extended in 1870. The original block is in stuccoed stone with a hipped slate roof, and the extensions are in brick. It is in two storeys, the entrance front has five bays, with six bays down the sides. The entrance has a porch with pairs of fluted Doric columns. On the right side is a square tower with a top entablature and balustrade. On its corner is a round stair turret surmounted by a cupola. Further back on the left side is a clock tower with pinnacles and a domed top. | II |
| 66 Roby Road; 53.40900°N 2.85523°W | — | c. 1840 | A brick house with stone dressings and a slate roof, in two storeys and three bays. The outer bays project forward and are gabled. In the ground floor the windows have lights with round heads and glazed spandrels, and each bay on the upper floor contains a sash window. In front of the ground floor is an ornate cast iron verandah. | II |
| Greenhill; 53.40813°N 2.84117°W | — | Mid 19th century | A brick villa, partly stuccoed, with a slate roof in eclectic style with some Classical features. It is in two storeys with cellars and the main fronts are asymmetrical and in three bays. Four steps lead up to a round-headed doorway with a pilastered architrave and a fanlight. Most of the windows are sashes. | II |
| Newland and 1 Victoria Road; 53.41031°N 2.83592°W | — | Mid 19th century | A pair of brick houses on a stone base with plaster dressings and slate roofs. They are in two storeys and have a four-bay front. The end bays project forward and have open pediments. The windows are sashes, some with pediments, and others with hood moulds. On the sides are two-storey canted porches. | II |
| Park Hall; 53.41038°N 2.83673°W | | 1856 | Built as a Congregational church with a school added to the east side in 1861. It is in Gothic style, built in stone with slate roofs in a single storey, and has a front of seven bays. Features include three gabled wings containing rose windows, mullioned windows, a date stone, gargoyles, and a slate-hung spire. | II |
| 20 and 22 St Mary's Road; 53.40896°N 2.83626°W | — | c. 1860 | A pair of brick houses with stone dressings and hipped slate roofs. They have two storeys and attics and are in four bays. The inner bays project forward, are gabled, and each contains a bay window with a cornice and a pierced parapet with embattled coping. All the windows are sashes. The doorways are on the sides and have gabled porches on round columns with foliate capitals. | II |
| 1–5 Station Road; 53.40919°N 2.85547°W | | c. 1870 | A terrace of five stone houses with slate roofs, in two storeys with a seven-bay front. In the fourth and six bays are timber-framed gabled bay windows with open lean-to porches on the ground floor. In the upper floors and in the gables are panels with painted floral decoration. The windows in the ground floor are casements, and in the upper floor they are oriels. | II |
| Huyton Cricket and Bowling Club Pavilion; 53.41594°N 2.83826°W | — | 1875 | The pavilion is timber framed on a brick plinth, with a tile roof. It has a rectangular plan, with expanded ends each containing a canted bay window, over which is a gabled dormer with bargeboards. There is a verandah running along both fronts, and in the centre are double doors flanked by fixed benches with decorative ends. | II |
| St Bartholomew's Church; 53.41208°N 2.85562°W | | 1875 | Designed by Ewan Christian in the style of about 1300, the church is in stone with a slate roof. It consists of a nave with a clerestory, north and south aisles, a chancel with a round apse, north and south vestries, and a west steeple. The steeple consists of a tower with clock faces on the north and south sides, and a broach spire with lucarnes. | II |
| United Reformed Church; 53.41130°N 2.83406°W | | 1889–90 | Originally a Congregational church, it was designed by W. D. Caroe, with 13th-century details. It is built in stone with a slate roof, and consists of a nave with north and south gabled aisles, a north transept, a chancel with a south vestry, and a north steeple. The steeple consists of a tower with a gabled porch, a north stair turret, and octagonal pinnacles. On the tower is a broach spire with lucarnes and a weather cock. | II |
| Village Cross; 53.41402°N 2.84063°W | | 1897 | The cross is a replica of a cross of 1820 by Thomas Rickman. It is in stone, and has five steps leading up to its base, which contains quatrefoil panels. From this rises a tapering octagonal shaft with a cornice. The top is square with panels containing tracery under crocketed gables. There is a niche containing a statue of St Michael, and a short spire. | II |
