= Huyton Quarry railway station =

Former railway station in England

Huyton Quarry

General information
- Location: Huyton, Metropolitan Borough of Knowsley; England
- Coordinates: 53.4108°N 2.8234°W
- Grid reference: SJ454907
- Platforms: 2

Other information
- Status: Disused

History
- Original company: Liverpool and Manchester Railway
- Pre-grouping: LNWR
- Post-grouping: London Midland and Scottish Railway

Key dates
- 1830: Opened
- 1958: Closed
Location

Huyton Quarry railway station opened in 1830 as part of the Liverpool and Manchester Railway, but Holt suggests it was originally known as the "station at the bottom of Whiston Incline" being renamed Huyton Quarry sometime after 1838. Either way it was one of the earliest passenger railway stations in the world. The station was closed by BR on 15 September 1958.

In 2014, an electrical switching site was constructed in the vicinity as part of the Manchester - Liverpool (via Earlestown) section of the NW electrification schemes.

| Preceding station | Disused railways | Following station |
|---|---|---|
| Huyton | Liverpool and Manchester Railway | Whiston |
