= National Wildflower Centre =

Visitor attraction in the United Kingdom

Coordinates: 50.360°N 4.744°W

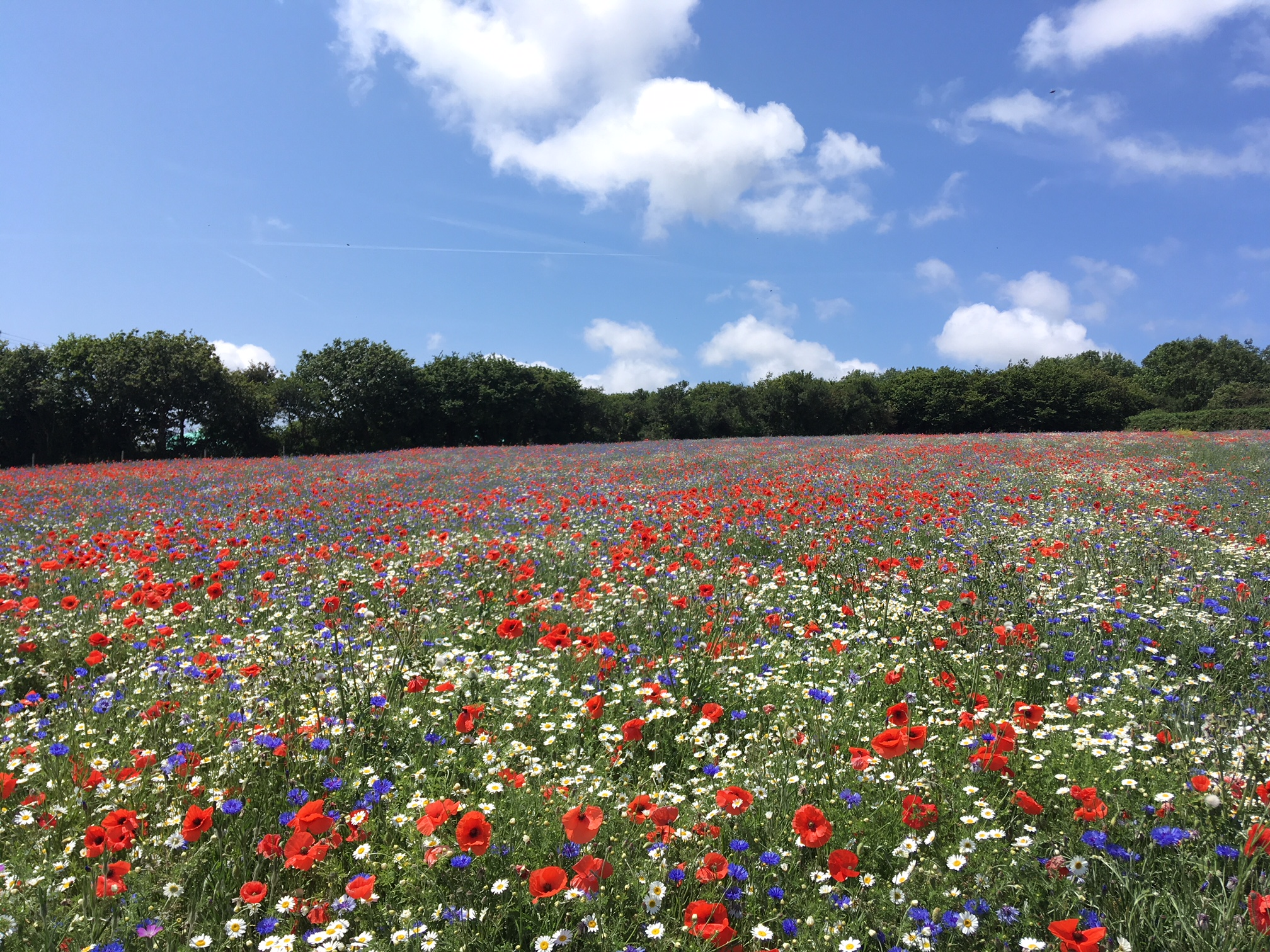
- A planting established by the National Wildflower Centre at the Eden Project
- Established: 2000
- Location: Court Hey Park, Liverpool (2000–2017); Eden Project, Cornwall, England (2017 onwards)
- Owner: Eden Project
- Website: www.edenproject.com/eden-story/our-ethos/national-wildflower-centre

The National Wildflower Centre is an organisation in the United Kingdom that works to promote urban ecological regeneration. Previously a visitor centre in Merseyside, it closed at this location in January 2017 and the Eden Project stepped in to save its legacy and build a new partnership from its new southwest base.

== History ==
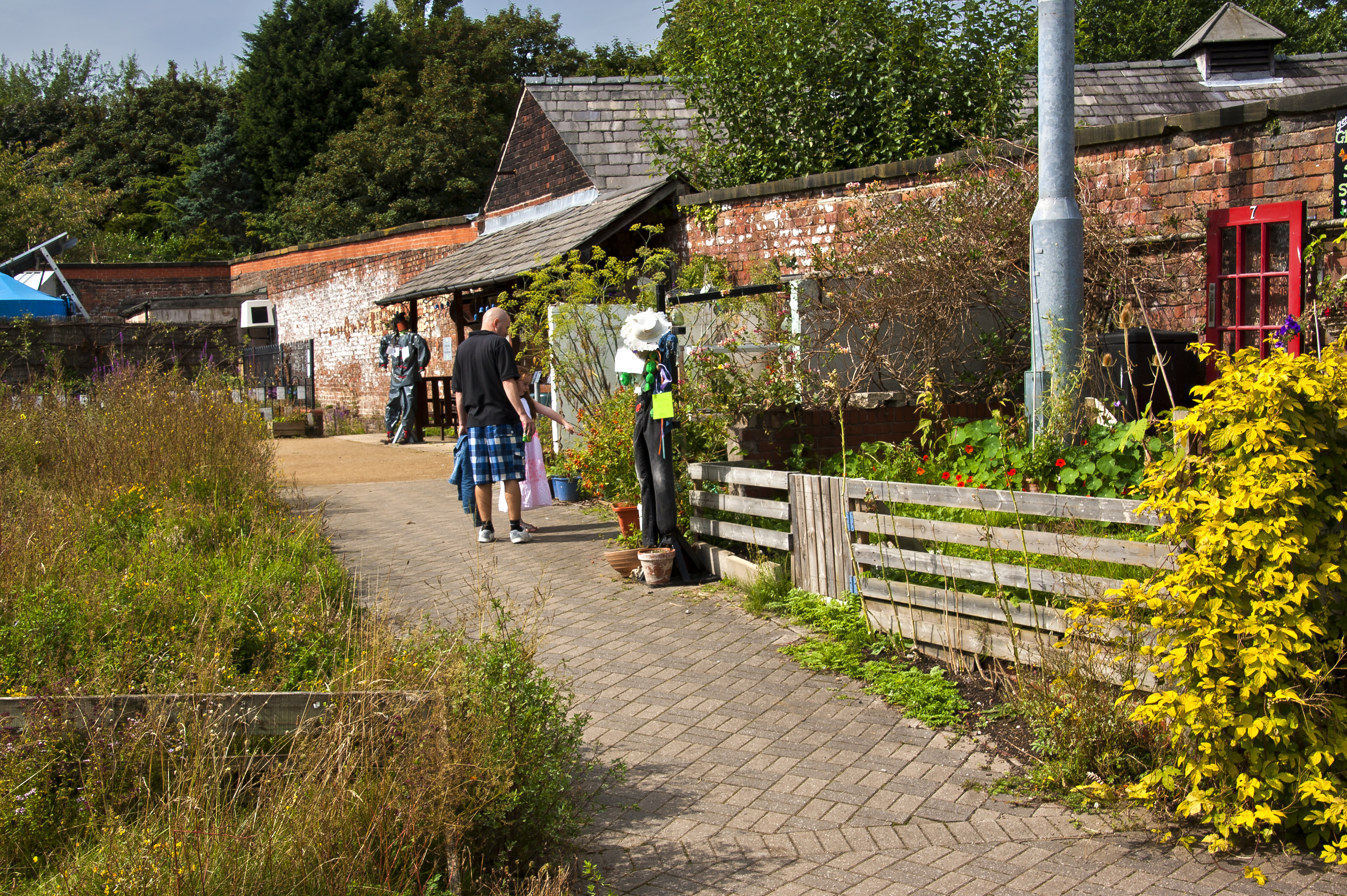
The original National Wildflower Centre in Knowsley, closed in 2017

The Centre originally opened in the Knowsley borough of Merseyside, England, in 2000 as a Millennium project, funded by the Millennium Commission and Big Lottery. Located in Court Hey Park, Liverpool, the visitor attraction was hoped to regenerate and help communities in the local area. The centre was designed around the concept of Wildflowers. This was combined with a visitor centre, a shop and a cafe.

The original attraction remained in operation until the early months of 2017, when owner and operator Landlife went into liquidation and, subsequently, the National Wildflower Centre was closed in order to raise funds. Landlife blamed decreasing visitor numbers, expensive maintenance of the buildings and grounds, and a new threat, severe vandalism. Landlife also blamed the contractor that constructed the buildings, Kier Group. Landlife claimed that in just 16 years, the buildings had visibly badly weathered and the roof of the visitor centre and cafe would regularly leak water. Since the attraction's closure, the site's entrances have been sealed and windows boarded up. In 2019, Knowsley Metropolitan Borough Council announced that they were looking for a buyer for the site. If successful, the site would be refurbished. The Twentieth Century Society added the building to its Risk List of architecture at risk of being lost in 2025.

The National Wildflower Centre is now based at the Eden Project, Cornwall. It continues its work nationally, particularly focusing on urban ecological regeneration in cities such as Liverpool and Manchester, and the establishment of local provenance seed for projects in southwest England. Several meadows have been established on the Eden Project site and are accessible to the public free of charge.
