= Harvey Lonsdale Elmes =

English architect (1814–1847)

Harvey Lonsdale Elmes (10 February 1814 – 26 November 1847) was an English architect, the designer of St George's Hall, Liverpool.

== Life ==
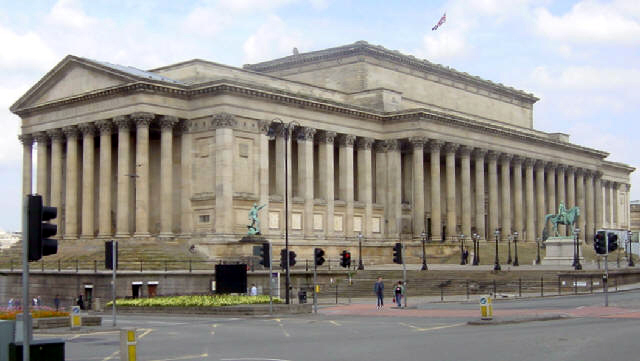
St George's Hall, Liverpool

The son of the architect, James Elmes, he was born in Chichester. After serving some time in his father's office, and under a surveyor at Bedford and an architect (Henry Goodridge) at Bath, Elmes became partner with his father in 1835.

One of the first buildings Elmes designed was 10-12 Queen Anne's Gate, Westminster, London, for Charles Pearson, the City Solicitor. In July, 1839, he was successful among 86 competitors for a design for St George's Hall, Liverpool. The foundation stone of this building had been laid on 28 June 1838, but, Elmes being successful in a competition for the Assize Courts in the same city, it was finally decided to include the hall and courts in a single building. Consequently, Elmes prepared a fresh design, and construction work commenced in 1841. He superintended its progress until 1847, when because of failing health, he was compelled to delegate his duties to John Weightman (City Surveyor) and Robert Rawlinson (Structural Engineer) and leave for Jamaica, where he died of consumption on 26 November 1847. Charles Robert Cockerell took over supervision of the project in 1851.

== Notable buildings ==
- St. George's Hall, Liverpool
- Liverpool Collegiate Institution
- Thingwall Hall
- Rainhill Hospital (now demolished)
