= Thingwall House =

Former mansion in Knotty Ash, Liverpool, England

Coordinates: 53.416°N 2.892°W

- Interactive map of the Thingwall House area

General information
- Architectural style: Jacobethan
- Location: Liverpool, England
- Construction started: 1869
- Demolished: 2004

Thingwall House was a Jacobethan manor house built in 1869 by Henry Arthur Bright, the shipping magnate, and was originally known as Ashfield. It is set on a 4.8-acre (19,000 m^{2}) site in the district of Knotty Ash, Liverpool, England. It should not be confused with Thingwall Hall, a local stately home just a few minutes walk further south.

In 1921 it was bequeathed by the Bright family to the city of Liverpool on condition that it was held in trust to be used as a home for 'girls of feeble mind'. It was owned by the Knotty Ash Special School Trust with Liverpool City Council serving as its trustees.

== Campaign for refurbishment ==
By the late 1990s the site was disused and proposals were put forward by property developers for the site to be used as a housing estate, but which was subsequently defeated by conservation campaigners.

In 2003 comedian Ken Dodd began a campaign to use the building to house a national archive, museum and school of British comedy. He also offered to donate his own private collection of comedy memorabilia for the museum. The proposal also included plans for the grounds to become a wildlife haven and park. The campaign was supported by the local newspaper, the Liverpool Echo in its Stop the Rot campaign aimed at saving local architecture and heritage.

In November 2003 the building was partially destroyed by an arson attack that had been predicted by Ken Dodd and other campaigners due to a lack of security on the site. Campaigners accused the council of deliberately supplying the house and grounds with inadequate security, with the further suggestion that if the building was vandalised beyond recovery the council could then argue there could be no public objections to selling the site for property development.

A further arson attack in May 2004 badly damaged the first and second floors of the building and destroyed the roof, also causing a partial collapse in a large section of the house while the fire was still blazing. Shortly thereafter the remaining part of the house was bulldozed by the council on the grounds of health and safety. However the campaigners still insisted that the park and grounds should be preserved and that the land not be used for development.

Ken Dodd and the Knotty Ash Village Conservation Society then put forward proposals for the site to become a nature reserve for children with special learning needs, supported by Mersey Forest and the Forestry Commission.

In April 2006 and with campaigners having raised £80,000 the overgrown site was once again damaged by vandals, this time trees were vandalised and burned before work could begin on the proposed outdoor centre.

On 15 February 2008 Liverpool City Council's agreed to hand over the land to Love and Joy Ministries. Planned facilities at the nature garden include an eco house and a visitor centre.

For various reasons the council delayed handing over the land to Love and Joy Ministries, however at the end of 2011 it finally did, with the land expected to be made usable by the end of 2012 and will be run by a new charity set up by LJM called Bright Park
