= Edward Fieldwick =

English cricketer

Personal information
- Full name: Edward Fieldwick
- Born: 25 March 1868; Huyton, Lancashire, England
- Died: 22 December 1910 (aged 42); Huyton, Lancashire, England
- Batting: Unknown
- Bowling: Unknown

Career statistics
Competition	First-class
Matches	1
Runs scored	0
Batting average	0.00
100s/50s	–/–
Top score	0
Balls bowled	80
Wickets	–
Bowling average	–
5 wickets in innings	–
10 wickets in match	–
Best bowling	–
Catches/stumpings	2/–
- Source: Cricinfo, 4 January 2015

Edward Fieldwick (25 March 1868 – 22 December 1910) was an English cricketer who made one appearance in first-class cricket in 1894. Born at Huyton, Lancashire, Fieldwick's batting and bowling styles are unknown.

A club cricketer for Huyton, Fieldwick's only appearance in first-class cricket came for Liverpool and District against Cambridge University in 1894 at Aigburth. Fieldwick was twice dismissed for a duck in the match and also went wicketless.

He died at the town of his birth on 22 December 1910.
