= Rain (British band) =

Alternative rock band from Liverpool

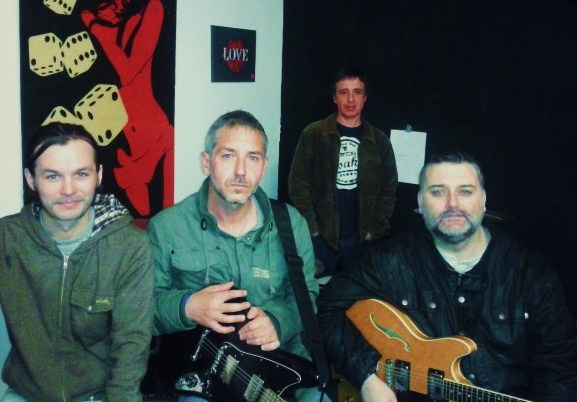

Background information
- Origin: Huyton, Liverpool, England
- Genres: Alternative rock
- Years active: 1988–1992
- Labels: Columbia
- Past members: Ned Murphy; Colin Clarke; Martyn Campbell; Tony McGuigan; Mark Robson

Rain were a Liverpool alternative rock band who had a minor hit in 1991 with "Lemonstone Desired".

== History ==
The band was formed at the Merseyside Trade Union Community and Unemployed Resource Centre in Huyton, Liverpool, in 1988 with a line-up of Ned Murphy (vocals, guitar), Colin Clarke (vocals, guitar), Martyn Campbell (bass guitar, vocals), and Tony McGuigan (drums). They were signed by Columbia Records in late 1989, and began recording with Nick Lowe producing. Unhappy with the results, they did not release any material until their 1991 debut single "Lemonstone Desired", which reached number 95 on the UK Singles Chart, and was the source of some controversy due to the photograph of a naked woman on the sleeve. The band recorded a session for Mark Goodier's BBC Radio 1 show in March that year. This was followed by debut album A Taste of Rain, drawing comparisons with Cream, R.E.M., and the Byrds, and a single featuring the title track from the album. The album was followed by a reissued "Lemonstone Desired", which proved to be the band's final release while together, although they shared a posthumous split album with the Real People in 1996, featuring tracks mainly taken from their album.

== Discography ==
=== Albums ===
- A Taste of Rain (1991), Columbia
- Liverpool: Calm Before the Storm (1996), Columbia - split with the Real People
- Ten Belters and a Slow One (2016)

=== Singles ===
- "Lemonstone Desired" (1991), Columbia - UK #95
- "A Taste of Rain" (1991), Columbia - UK #95
- "Lemonstone Desired" (1991), Columbia - reissue
