= Huyton railway station =

Railway station in Merseyside, England

Coordinates: 53.410°N 2.843°W

Huyton
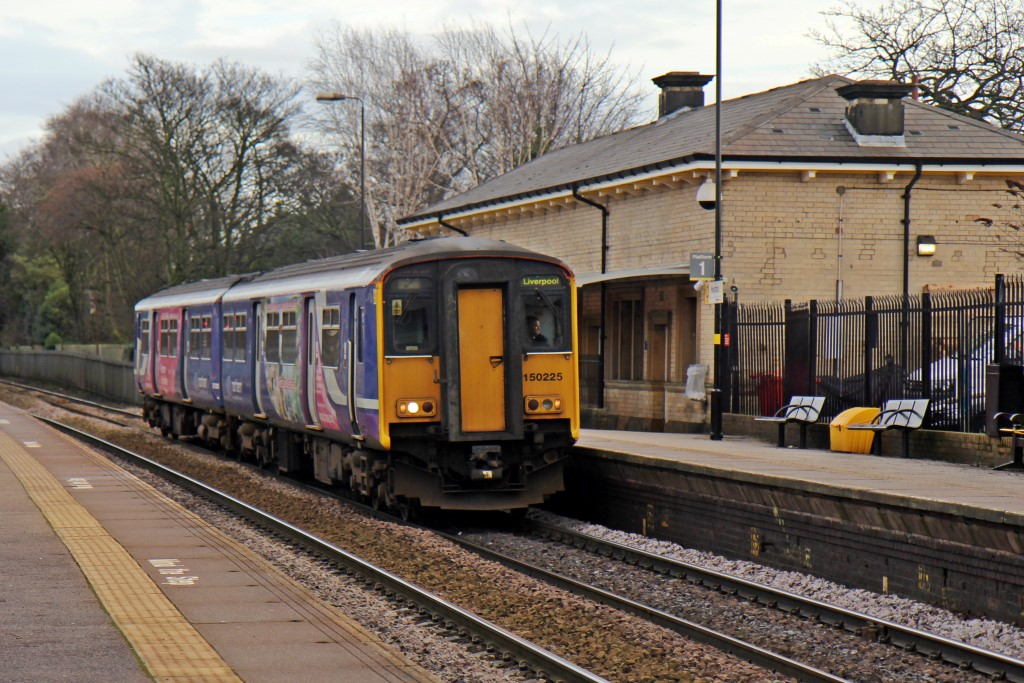
- Northern Rail Class 150 heading to Liverpool in 2014

General information
- Location: Huyton, Knowsley; England
- Grid reference: SJ440906
- Manager: Northern Trains
- Transit authority: Merseytravel
- Platforms: 4

Other information
- Station code: HUY
- Fare zone: C1/A3/C2/C3
- Classification: DfT category D

Key dates
- 15 September 1830: Opened
- 2010: Renovated
- 2015: Electrification and reopening of disused platforms

Passengers
- 2021/22: ▲0.483 million
- Interchange: ▲11,673
- 2022/23: ▲0.535 million
- Interchange: ▲18,684
- 2023/24: ▲0.631 million
- Interchange: ▲21,770
- 2024/25: ▲0.695 million
- Interchange: ▲23,207
- 2025/26: ▲0.708 million
- Interchange: ▲27,828
Location
Notes
- Passenger statistics from the Office of Rail and Road

Huyton railway station serves Huyton in Merseyside, England. The station is an interchange between the Liverpool-Wigan Line and the northern route of the Liverpool-Manchester Line which diverge soon after the station. It is one of the busier stations on the lines and close to the shopping centre and bus station.

== History ==
Huyton station was opened in 1830 on the Liverpool and Manchester Railway, and is one of the oldest passenger railway stations in the world. The early intermediate stations were little more than halts, usually where the railway was crossed by a road or turnpike. This probably accounts for variations in their names, Huyton station was probably known as Huyton Lane Gate, then as Huyton Lane by 1839, and Huyton around 1852. The oldest surviving station buildings are from the LNWR period. Until the 1970s, Huyton station had four platforms, but two on the northern side of the station (Platforms 3 and 4) were closed, and the track lifted.

=== 2010 modernisation ===
Almost £1 million was spent modernising the station in 2010. The works include a canopy on Platform 1, a waiting shelter on Platform 2 and a disability compliant toilet was installed. Improvements included updating the subway to provide better lighting, state-of-the-art CCTV and new seating areas.

=== Liverpool to Manchester electrification ===
In the Liverpool-Manchester Line electrification scheme, Platform 3 was brought back into use in time for the December 2014 timetable change. The station signal box, which controlled the line between Roby and Rainhill (Earlestown line)/Prescot (Wigan line), was closed and demolished in the associated resignalling scheme. The last few semaphore signals that it controlled were removed in September 2012. Electrification has been in place since March 2015.

Platform 4 was re-instated in the improvements connected with the Liverpool to Manchester and Wigan electrification in 2015.

== Facilities ==
Huyton is staffed and open for approximately 18 hours a day and has a booking office, a payphone and a vending machine. There is undercover seating on each platform, customer help points and live departure and arrival screens. Recent improvements include lifts to the platforms and ramped walkways from the subway, to allow step-free access to the platforms for passengers with wheelchairs or prams. Portable ramps are available to access trains. The station is close to Huyton bus station and shopping centre. The station has a car park, taxi rank and cycle racks.

== Services ==
The station is on the Liverpool to Wigan Line and Stephenson's Liverpool to Manchester Line. The junction between the lines is to the east of the station. The station has regular services of approximately 20–30 minutes, to Liverpool, Manchester and Wigan. Eight trains per hour call at the station, operated by Northern Trains (TransPennine Express services between Liverpool and Newcastle/Scarborough pass through but do not stop). After electrification was finished in 2015, most services were operated by Class 319 EMUs under the Northern Electrics sub-brand. When Liverpool to Manchester services were extended to Crewe in May 2018, Class 323 units started to be introduced on this route as well as the Liverpool to Warrington Bank Quay line. In September 2019, brand new Class 331 units commenced operation on the semi-fast Liverpool to Blackpool service. The Class 319 units are to be replaced in 2023 by extra class 323s from West Midlands Trains.

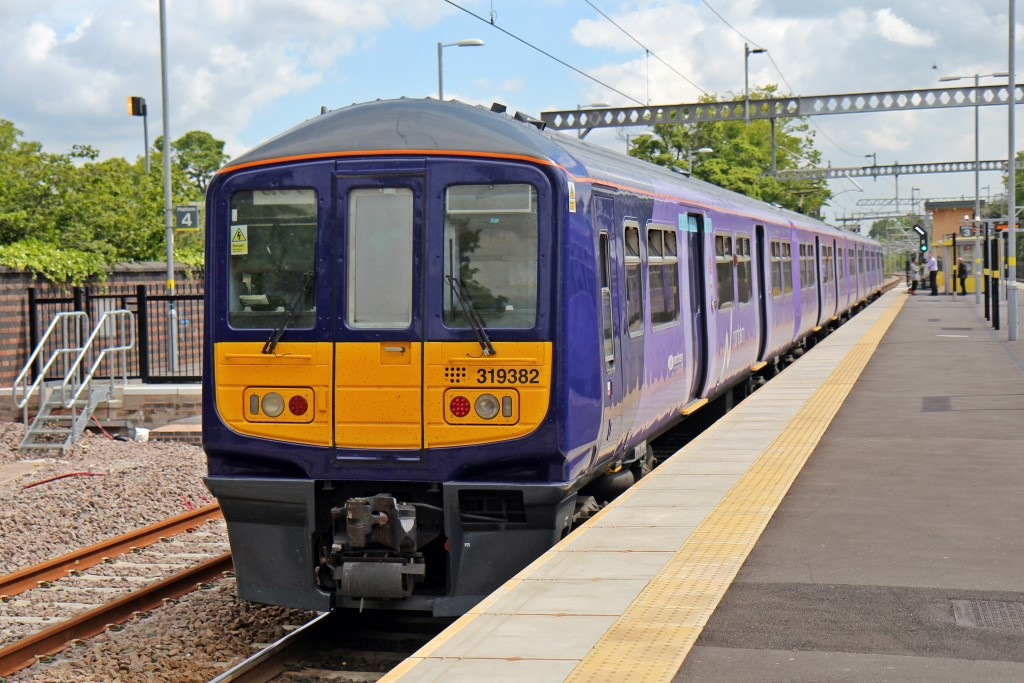
A Northern Electrics Class 319 at the newly reopened platform 3, in 2015.

- 2tph to Wigan North Western (local)
- 1tph to Manchester Airport via Manchester Piccadilly
- 1tph to Preston and Blackpool North (semi-fast)
- 4tph to Liverpool Lime Street

A limited service to Manchester Victoria operates at peak times and in the early morning/late evening. The hourly service that formerly ran to Warrington Bank Quay was suspended at the start of the pandemic and has never been reinstated. A single early morning train to Ellesmere Port operates as a Parliamentary train to maintain a minimum service over this route, with a return working in the evening.

On Sundays, there is a less frequent service - 2tph to Lime Street and 1tph each to Manchester Airport via Manchester Piccadilly and Blackpool North via Wigan.

During modernisation and resignalling work at Lime Street in summer 2017 and again in June–July 2018, the station is a temporary terminus for trains in the evenings and weekends, with a replacement bus shuttle service to and from central Liverpool.

== Gallery ==
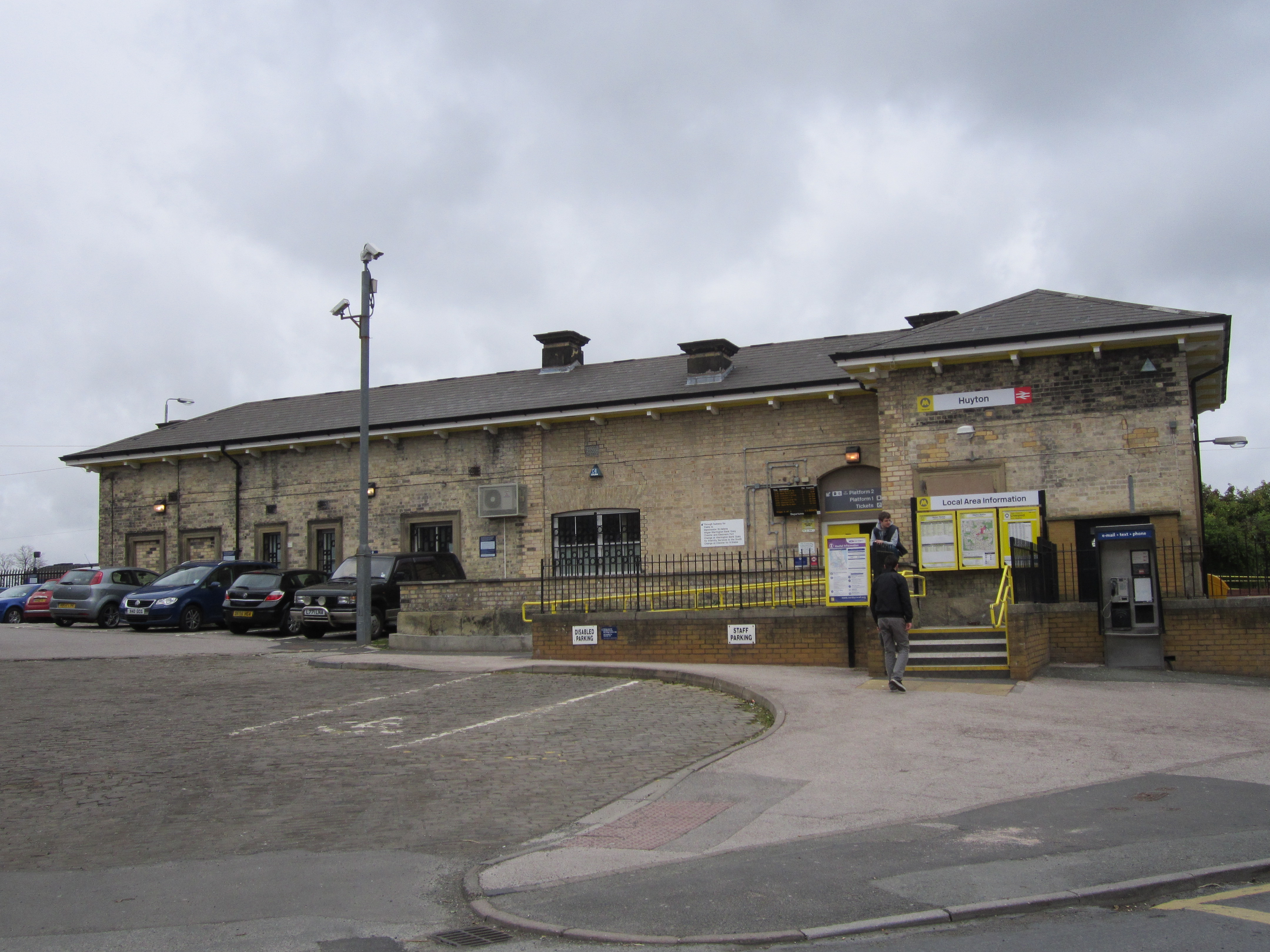
The station building, viewed from the road.

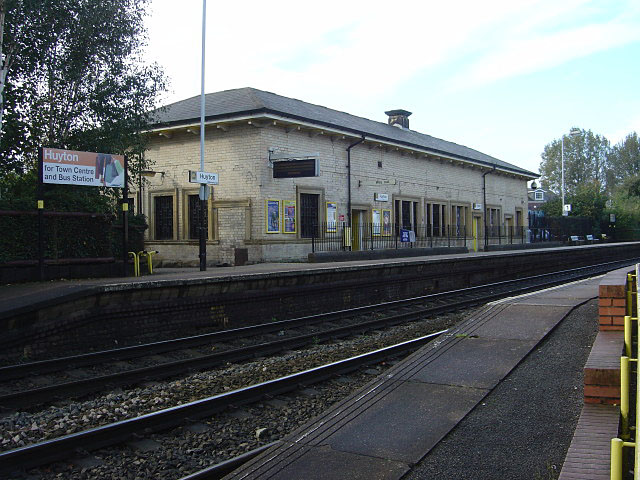
The station building, viewed from the platform.

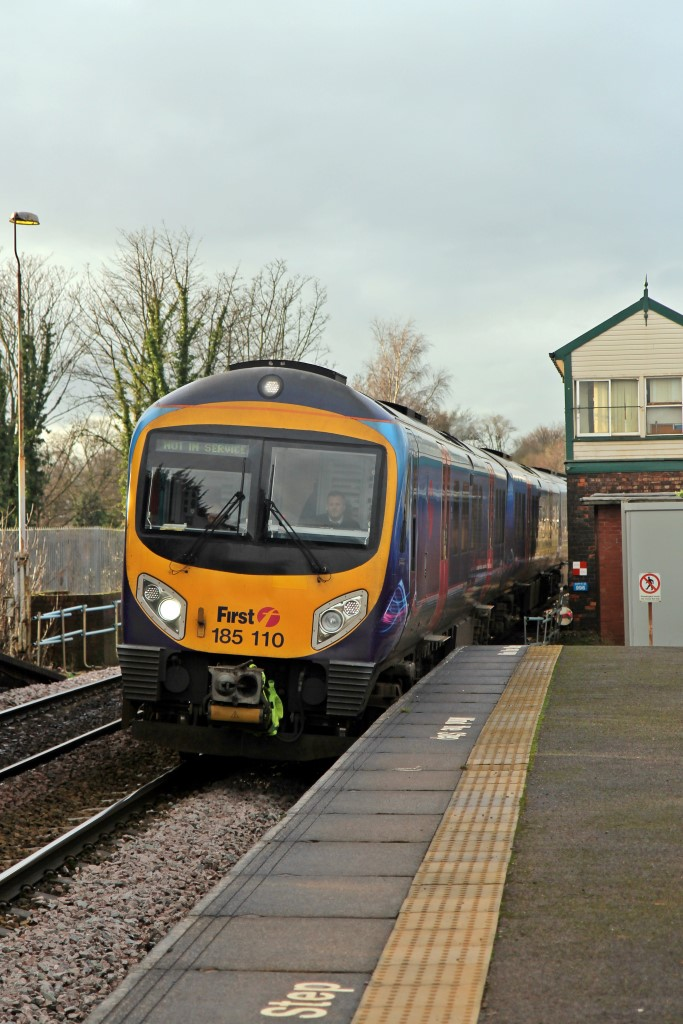
A First TransPennine Class 185 passes the signal box.

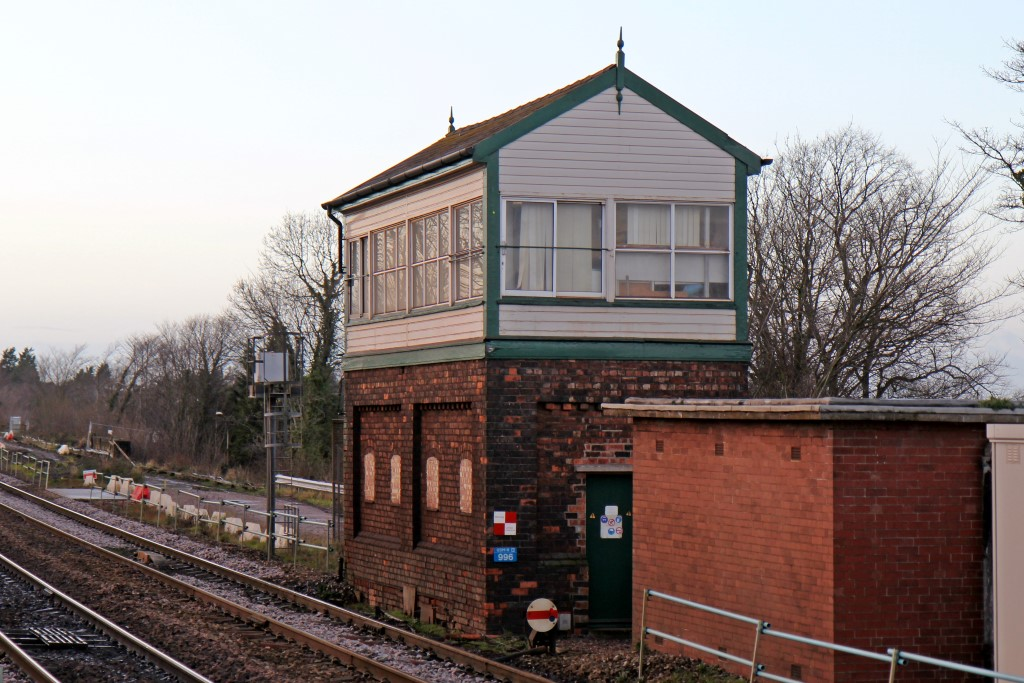
The former signal box at the end of platform 2, demolished in 2014.

Preceding station	National Rail	Following station
Liverpool Lime Street	Northern Trains; Liverpool to Wigan line	St Helens Central
Roby	Northern Trains; Liverpool to Wigan line	Prescot
Roby	Northern Trains; Liverpool to Manchester line	Whiston
	Historical railways	
Roby	Liverpool and Manchester Railway	Huyton Quarry
