= Bowring Park, Merseyside =

Coordinates: 53.404°N 2.870°W

Bowring Park
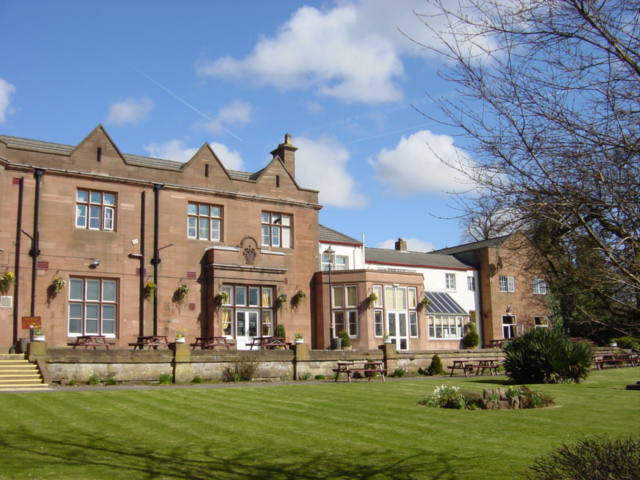
- The rear of Derby Lodge Hotel, Bowring Park

- Location within Merseyside
- OS grid reference: SJ4178890431
- Metropolitan borough: Knowsley
- Metropolitan county: Merseyside
- Region: North West
- Country: England
- Sovereign state: United Kingdom
- Post town: LIVERPOOL
- Postcode district: L16
- Dialling code: 0151
- Police: Merseyside
- Fire: Merseyside
- Ambulance: North West
- UK Parliament: Knowsley

Bowring Park is a small suburb of Liverpool in the borough of Knowsley, Merseyside, England.

It lies between the Childwall and Roby districts and is adjacent to the M62 motorway.

Court Hey Park (home of the National Wildflower Centre between 2001 and 2017) is in the Bowring Park area. Bowring Park Golf Course is split in two by the motorway.
