= Roby railway station =

Railway station in Roby, Merseyside, England

Coordinates: 53.410°N 2.856°W

Roby
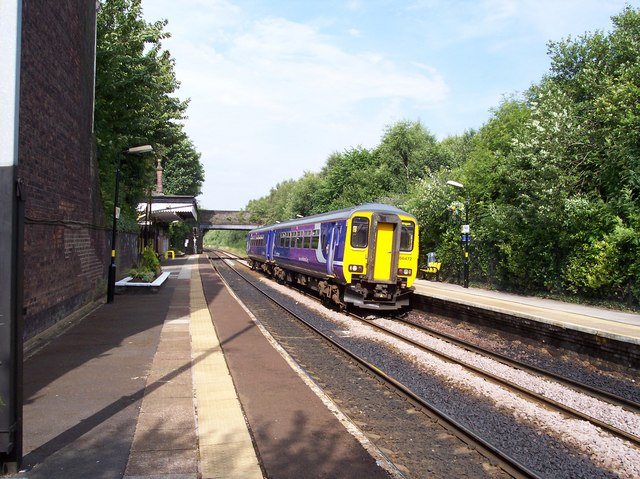
- A Northern Rail Class 156 at Roby in 2008

General information
- Location: Roby, Knowsley; England
- Grid reference: SJ432906
- Manager: Northern Trains
- Transit authority: Merseytravel
- Platforms: 4

Other information
- Station code: ROB
- Fare zone: C1
- Classification: DfT category E

Passengers
- 2021/22: ▲0.153 million
- 2022/23: ▲0.163 million
- 2023/24: ▲0.182 million
- 2024/25: ▲0.201 million
- 2025/26: ▲0.213 million
Location
Notes
- Passenger statistics from the Office of Rail and Road

Roby railway station serves the village of Roby, Merseyside, England. It is located 5 miles (8 km) east of Liverpool Lime Street on the former Liverpool and Manchester Railway, and 1/2 mile (800 m) west of Huyton. It is operated by Northern Trains, as part of Merseytravel's electrified City Line to Manchester and Wigan North Western.

== History ==
Roby station was opened in 1830 as part of the Liverpool and Manchester Railway, and is one of the oldest passenger railway stations in the world. These early intermediate stations were often little more than halts, usually positioned where the railway was crossed by a road or turnpike. This probably accounts for variations in the names of these stopping places; Roby station was originally known as Roby Lane Gate, or just Roby Gate before finally becoming Roby at an unknown date. Originally Roby station had four platforms, but the two platforms on the northern side of the station (Platforms 3 and 4) were closed in the 1970s, and the track was lifted. As part of the electrification of the Liverpool-Manchester Line, Platforms 3 and 4 have been re-instated. The station has also received new customer information screens and a P.A system as part of this work.

== Facilities ==
It is staffed throughout the day (as is the norm for Merseytravel-sponsored stations), with the ticket office (located in the main building on platform one) open from 05:30 until 00:10 Mondays to Saturdays and 09:45 to 17:45 on Sundays. Shelters are available on the other three platforms, along with digital information screens, timetable poster boards, automatic train announcements and customer help points. Full step-free access is offered to the platforms (to 2, 3 and 4 via lifts).

== Services ==
During the daytime, Monday to Saturday, the station is served by three trains per hour in each direction. All Westbound trains run to Liverpool Lime Street, calling at all stations.

Eastbound trains serve Huyton, then continue to Wigan North Western (two trains per hour) or Manchester Piccadilly and Manchester Airport (one train per hour). There is currently no direct service to Warrington Bank Quay - the hourly service that ran prior to the pandemic was withdrawn in spring 2020 and has not been reinstated.

For many years, Roby was closed on Sundays. However, from December 2006, the station gained a Sunday service, with two trains per hour to Liverpool, one train per hour to Manchester and one train per hour to Blackpool North via Wigan. A second hourly stopping service to and from Wigan began at the spring 2018 timetable change, but has since ceased.

== Gallery ==
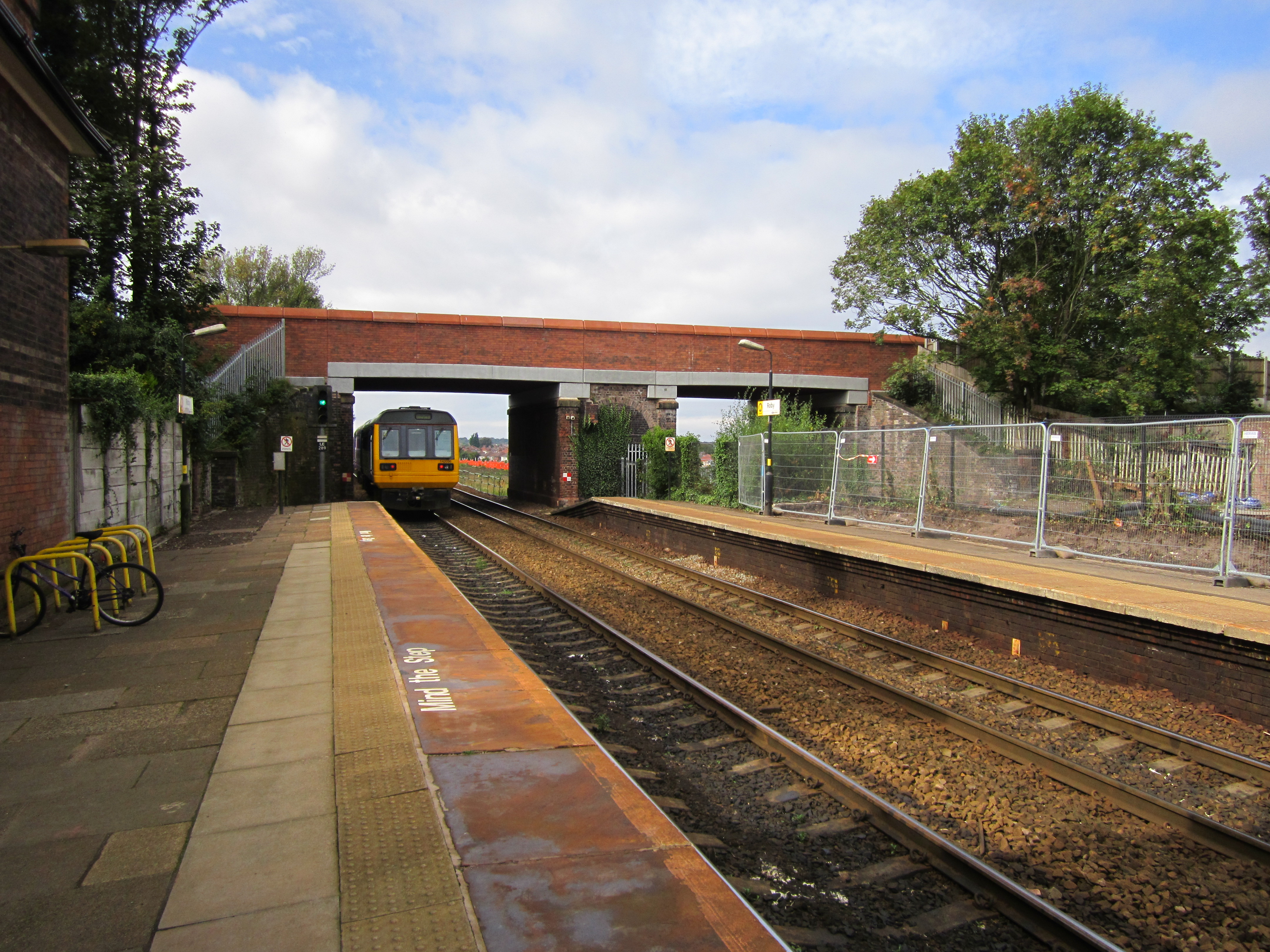
A Northern Rail Class 142 departs towards Liverpool. Engineering work for the reinstatment of platforms is visible.

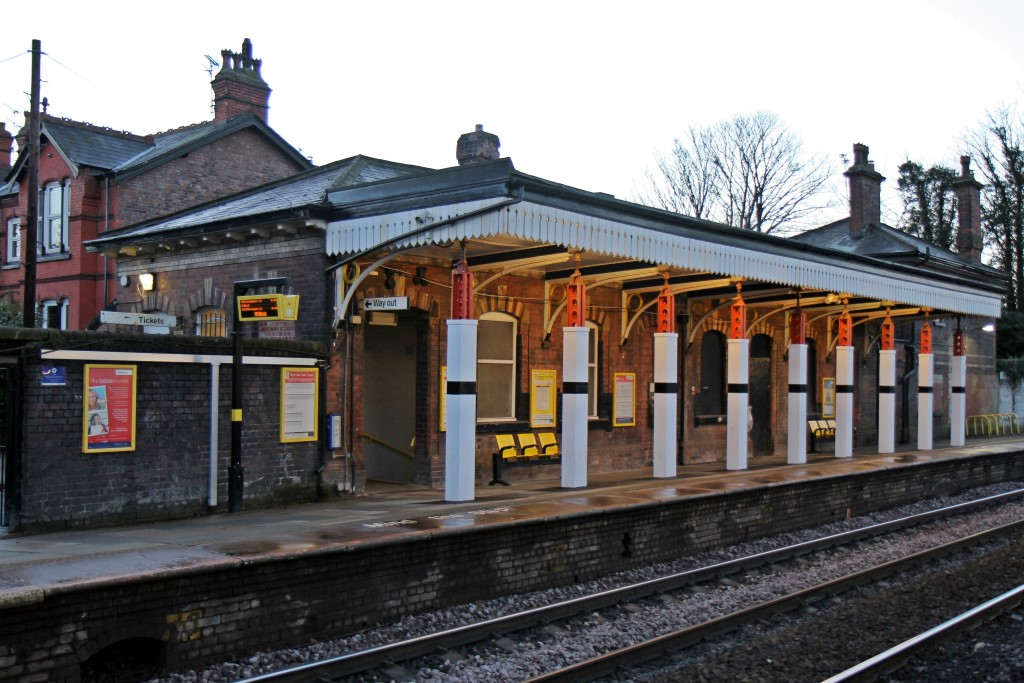
The station booking office, from the platform.

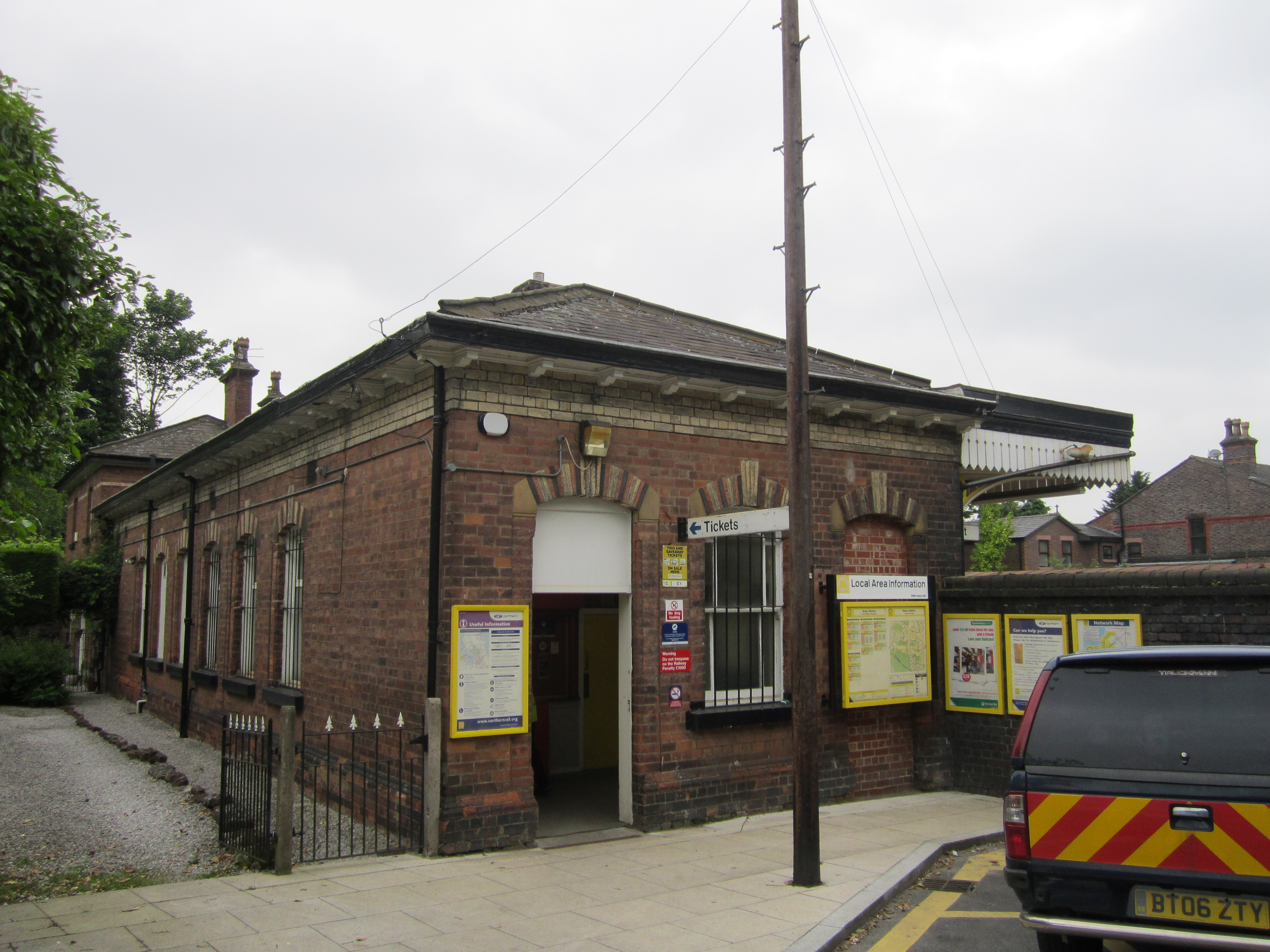
The station booking office, from the street.

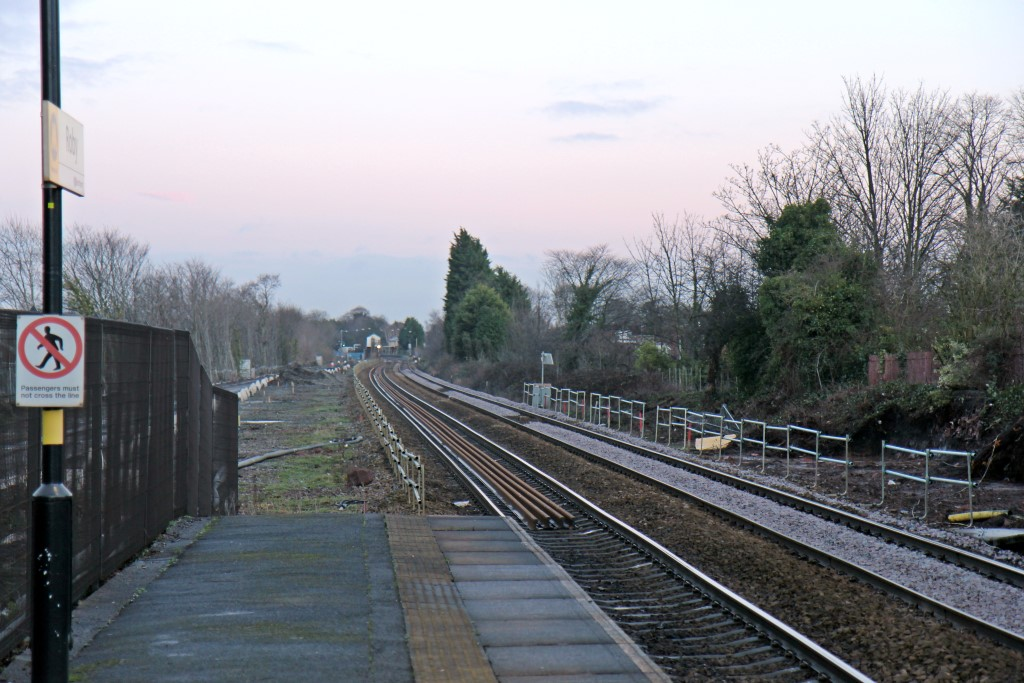
The engineering work for the reinstatement of track between Roby and Huyton.

Preceding station	National Rail	Following station
Broad Green	Northern Trains; Liverpool-Manchester Line	Huyton
Broad Green	Northern Trains; Liverpool-Wigan Line	Huyton
