= Thingwall Hall =

Country house in Liverpool, England

Coordinates: 53.413°N 2.889°W

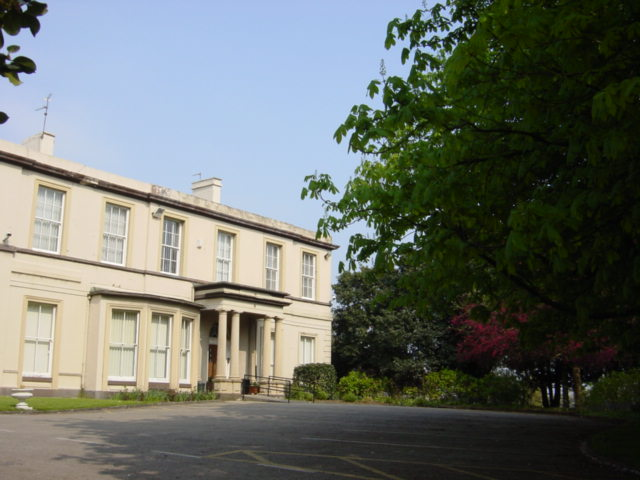
- Thingwall Hall
- Interactive map of the Thingwall Hall area

General information
- Location: Liverpool, England

Thingwall Hall is a former stately home situated in the Knotty Ash district of Liverpool, England. The grade II listed building was built early in the 19th century and was originally set in 60 acres (240,000 m^{2}) of grounds. It can upon occasion be mistaken for the nearby Thingwall House.

== History ==
According to Stephen Harding's Viking Mersey, Thingwall Hall is on the site of a Thing which, like Thingwall on the Wirral and the Tynwald on the Isle of Man (and Dingwall and Tingwall in Scotland), was one of the local Scandinavian parliaments in the Norse-occupied areas of the British Isles.

A Liverpool merchant Thomas Crowther lived there in 1824 and at this time the hall was known as Summerhill. Thomas Case of the prominent Case family and also Mayor of Liverpool in 1817 lived there for a time. In 1845 the property was purchased from the executors of Thomas Case by Samuel Thompson. It eventually descended through the important Thompson family, to his son and grandson, Samuel Henry Thompson and Henry Yates Thompson before being sold by Annie Thompson to Sir David Radcliffe at the beginning of 1899, who in turn sold the property to a land company in 1903.

The mansion house and 10 acres (40,000 m^{2}) of the surrounding estate were subsequently purchased by a Belgian religious institute, the Brothers of Charity and it became known as St. Edward's Home, a poor law school and eventually a residential care home and sheltered accommodation for vulnerable adults. Beyond the hall there is a small "village" of housing for the residents, along with a garden centre which provides some employment and activity for many of them.

In most recent years the land was purchased by a housing developer with the intent to construct up to 550 homes upon the site.

== See also ==
- Listed buildings in Huyton with Roby
