= Reginald Moss (cricketer) =

English cricketer

Reginald Heber Moss (24 February 1868 – 19 March 1956) was an English first-class cricketer: a right-handed batsman and a right-arm bowler of both fast and medium pace. He is the oldest cricketer to appear in the County Championship.

Born in Huyton, Liverpool, Moss played most of his first-class cricket for Oxford University, appearing 13 times between 1887 and 1890; he won a blue in 1889. His first match in 1887 was against Lancashire, for whom he had played a handful of minor games before going up to Keble College, Oxford, while his best bowling performance came in his final university game, when he took 4–9 against Sussex.

His interest in athletics prevented Moss from appearing more often; he came third against Cambridge in the shot put. After leaving Oxford, Moss played two matches in the 1893 season: an ineffective performance against Lancashire for Marylebone Cricket Club (MCC) at Lord's (he scored 3 and 4 and did not bowl or take a catch), and an only marginally more productive appearance for Liverpool and District against the touring Australians, in which he took 0-23 and made 13 in an innings defeat.

Moss was to make only one further appearance, for Worcestershire, but extraordinarily this came in the 1925 County Championship, nearly 32 years after his previous first-class game when Moss was 57. Batting at number 9 in the first innings and number 11 in the second, he made 2 and 0 and, coming in with just 19 needed for Worcestershire to win the match, he was "an easy victim for Hammond" according to The Times. But he fared better in the field, picking up the wicket of Gloucestershire opener Michael Green and holding two catches. He is identified on the scorecard of this match as "The Rev R. H. Moss": he was Rector of Icomb, Gloucestershire.

He died at the age of 88 in Bridport, Dorset.
