= Court Hey Park =

Park in Merseyside, England

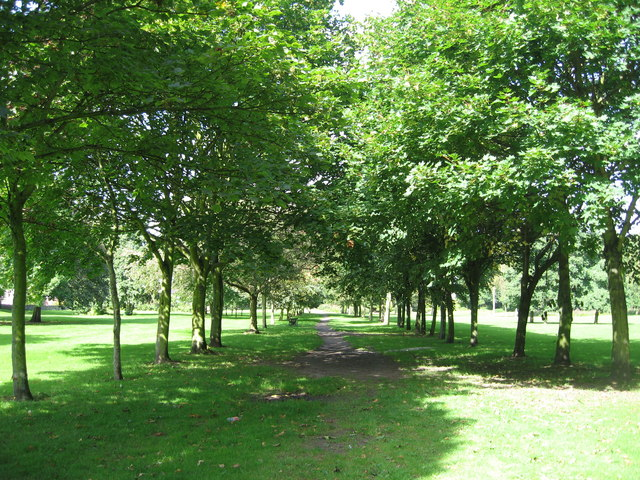
- Interactive map of Court Hey Park
- Type: Public
- Location: Liverpool, Merseyside
- Coordinates: 53.405253°N 2.876370°W
- Area: 14 hectares
- Operator: Knowsley Council

Court Hey Park is a park in the Bowring Park suburb of Knowsley borough in Merseyside, England. It lies about 4 1/2 miles (7 km) east of Liverpool city centre.

== History ==
Court Hey Park can be traced back to 1783 when it was a farmer's field forming part of the estate of Lord Derby. The grounds were acquired by Robertson Gladstone (1805–1875) who was elder brother to the four times Prime Minister, William Gladstone.

Robertson Gladstone married Mary Ellen Heywood-Jones in January 1836 and the mansion house, Court Hey Hall, was built the same year in the 60-acre (240,000 m^{2}) walled estate.

Gladstone acquired the original sandstone railway sleepers once traversed by George Stephenson's world famous locomotive Rocket, most likely when the railway was converted to wooden sleepers in 1836-9. These were used to edge the main drives of the park and are still prominent today.

The hall remained in the Gladstone family until the death of one of Robertson Gladstone's sons in 1919. In the same year it was bought by J. Bibby and Sons, a cattle food manufacturer. They established an experimental poultry and cattle feed farm and developed the park as a centre for sport and recreation.

Recreation continued alongside a printing business, which was established in the grounds in 1923. Football, tennis, bowls and cricket were played in the park, while the hall was used for ballroom dances, billiards and other social activities.

During the Second World War, part of the estate including the stable block was requisitioned by the Ministry of Agriculture Fisheries and Foods and used as a quarantine station.

From the late 1940s Liverpool Pembroke, an athletic and cycling club, also used the park as a base until redevelopment forced them to move in the 1960s.

The hall and grounds fell into disrepair and in 1951 the company sold the estate to Huyton-with-Roby Council. The hall was demolished in 1956 and part of the land sold to Vernons Pools. A housing estate was established, now called the Grangewood/High Beeches Estate. The original entrance to the Vernons factory runs alongside the eastern side of the estate.

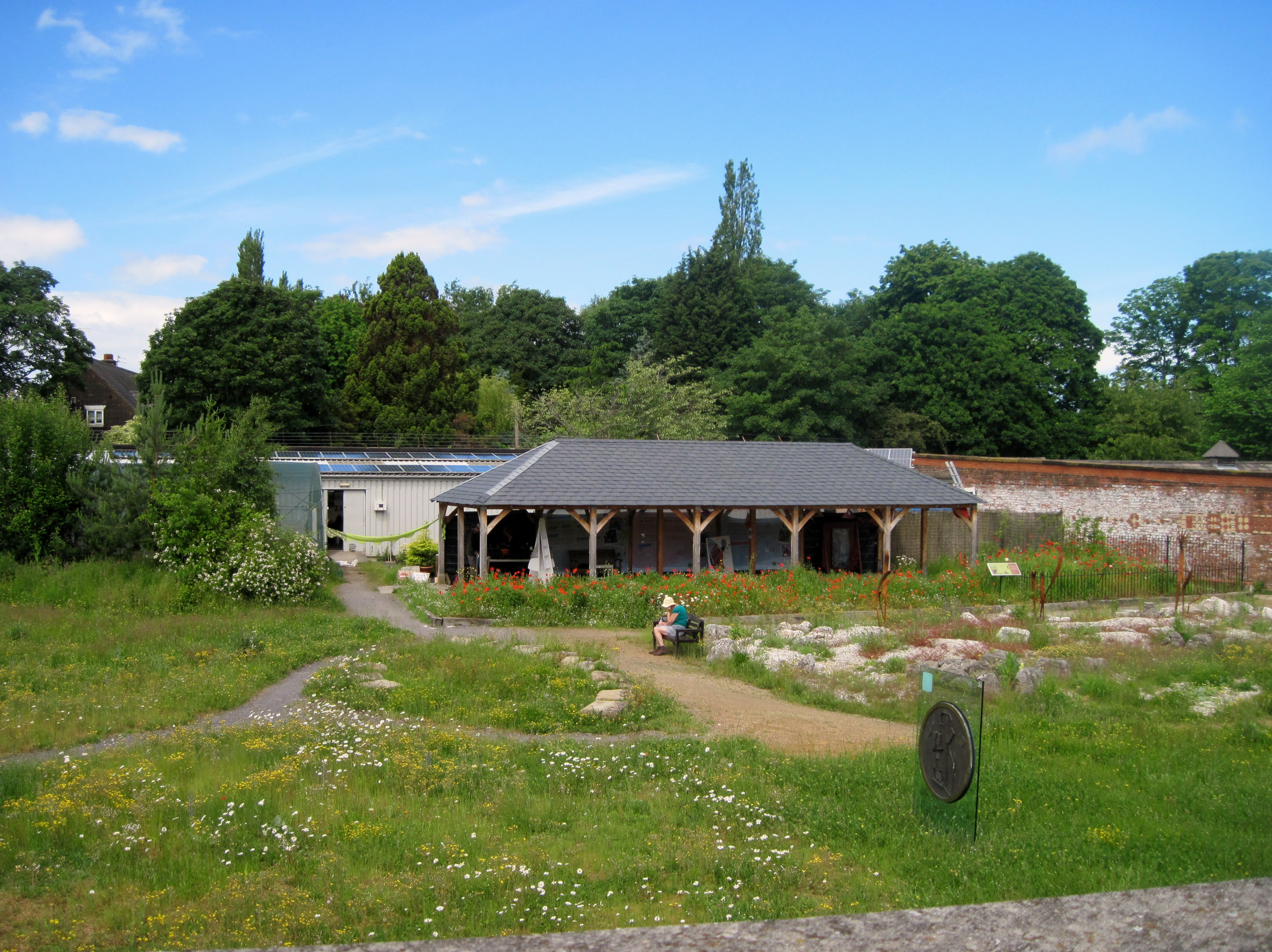
The National Wildflower Centre in 2012

The stable buildings and sections of the original walled garden were the home of the National Wildflower Centre between 2000 and 2017.
