= Whiston railway station =

Railway station in Whiston, Merseyside, England

Coordinates: 53.414°N 2.796°W

Whiston
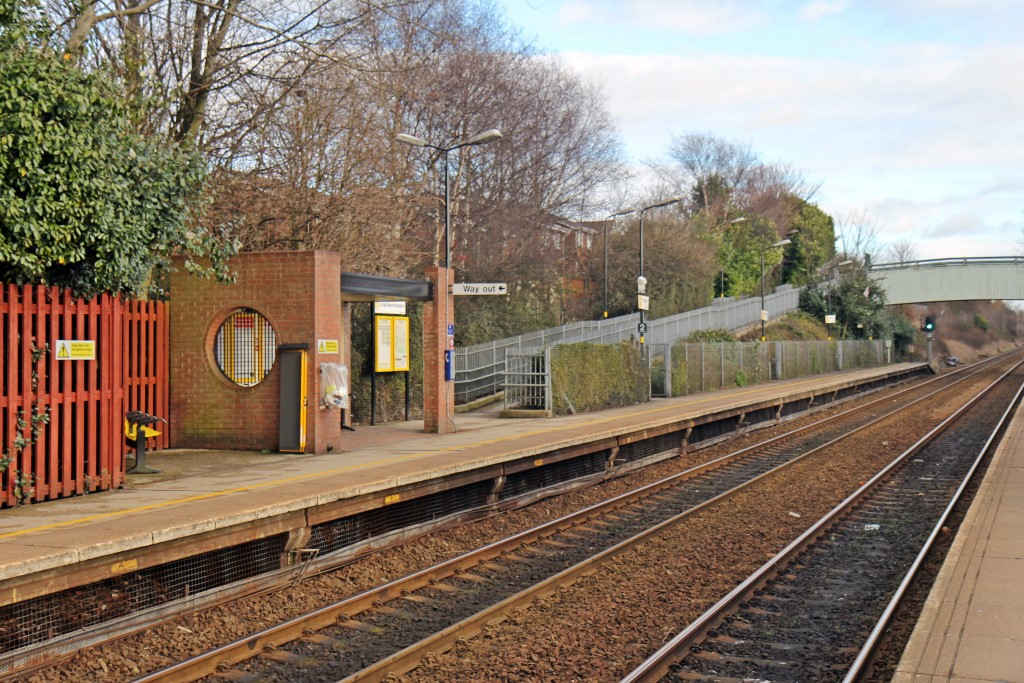
- The station in 2014 prior to electrification

General information
- Location: Whiston, Knowsley; England
- Grid reference: SJ471910
- Manager: Northern Trains
- Transit authority: Merseytravel
- Platforms: 2

Other information
- Station code: WHN
- Fare zone: A3/C2/C3
- Classification: DfT category E

Key dates
- 10 September 1990: Opened

Passengers
- 2021/22: ▲0.165 million
- 2022/23: ▲0.203 million
- 2023/24: ▲0.207 million
- 2024/25: ▼0.178 million
- 2025/26: ▲0.181 million
Location
Notes
- Passenger statistics from the Office of Rail and Road

Whiston railway station serves the village of Whiston in Merseyside, England. The station, and all trains serving it, are operated by Northern Trains. It lies on the electrified northern route of the Liverpool to Manchester Line, the original Liverpool and Manchester Railway 7 1/2 miles (12 km) east of Liverpool Lime Street. It was opened on 10 September 1990 by British Rail, at a cost of £420,000.

== Facilities ==
The station is staffed throughout the day, from 06:00 to 23:55 Mondays through to Saturdays and 08:40 to midnight on Sundays. The ticket office is on the Liverpool-bound platform. There are also waiting shelters, help points, timetable poster boards and digital information screens on each platform. Both platforms have step-free access, as has the connecting bridge between them.

== Services ==
Whiston is served by Northern.

The station receives an hourly service to Liverpool Lime Street and an hourly service to Manchester Airport. There is a daily train to Wigan North Western, and some peak hour services to Manchester Victoria.

On Sundays, trains run once per hour between Liverpool Lime Street and Wilmslow via Manchester Airport.

Services are operated mainly using Class 323s & Class 331s.

== Gallery ==
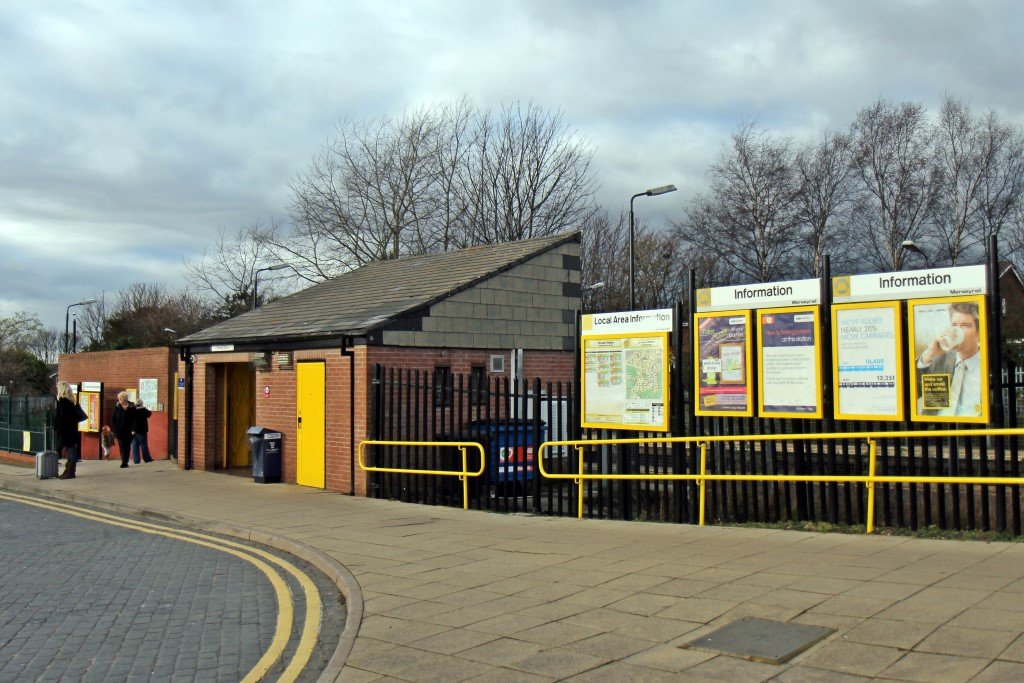
The station booking office and entrance.

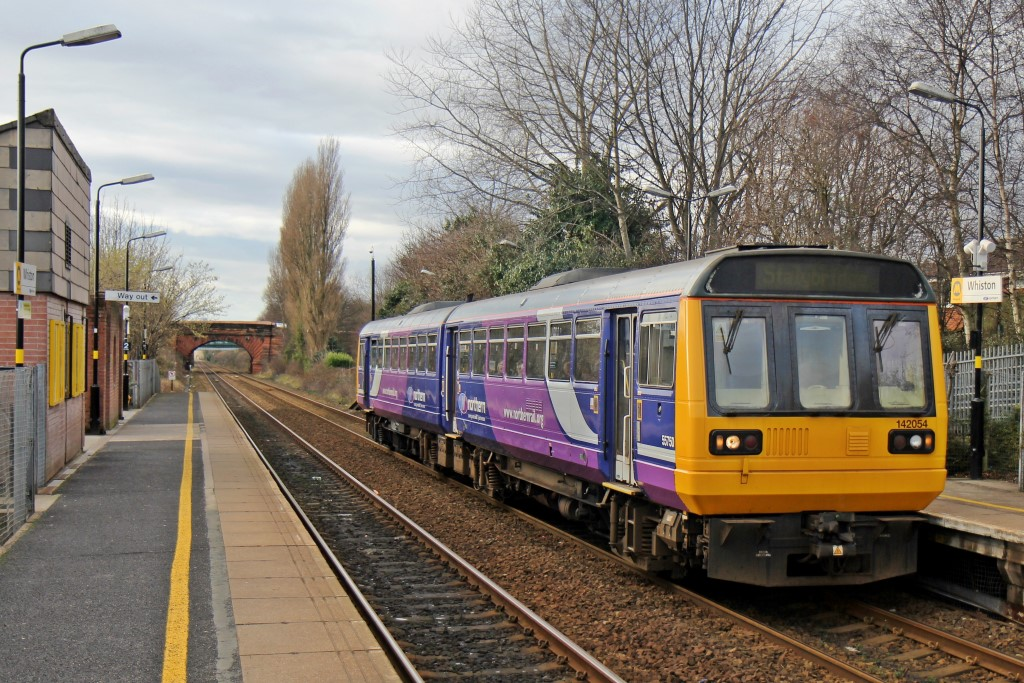
A Northern Rail Class 142 waits at the station.

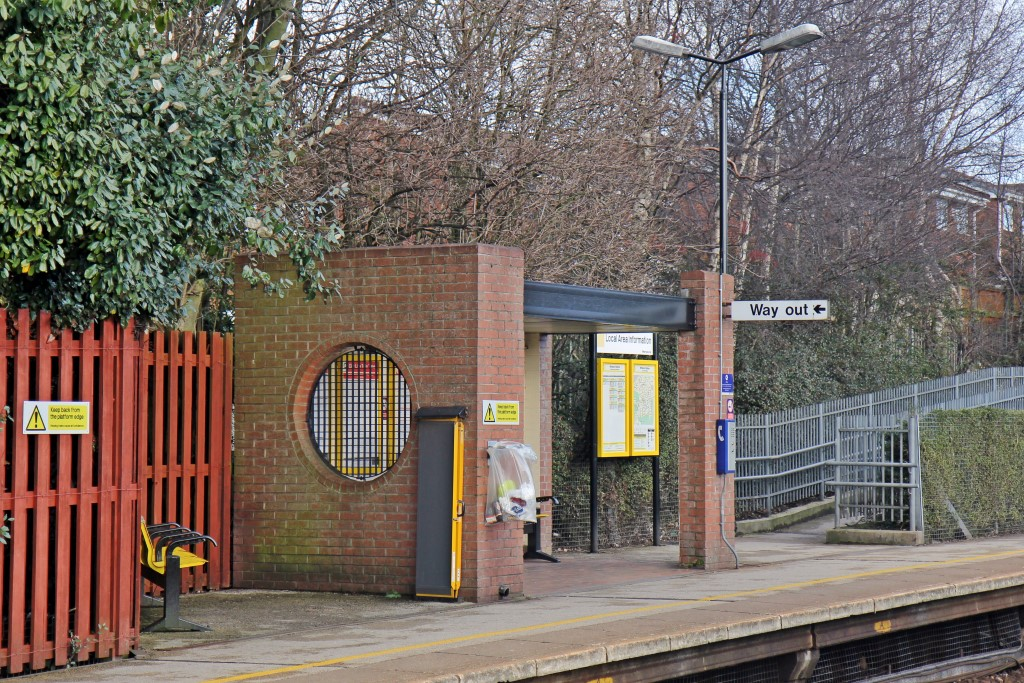
One of the platform waiting shelters.

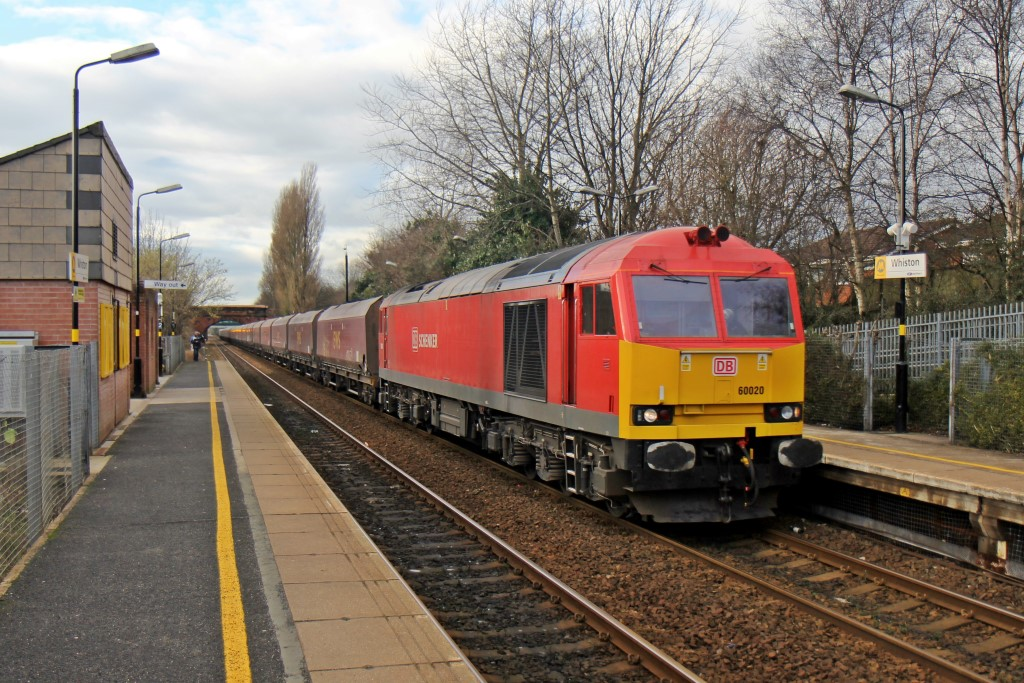
A DB Schenker Class 60 passes through the station with a freight train.

Preceding station	National Rail	Following station
Huyton	Northern Trains; Liverpool to Manchester Line	Rainhill
