= List of oratorios =

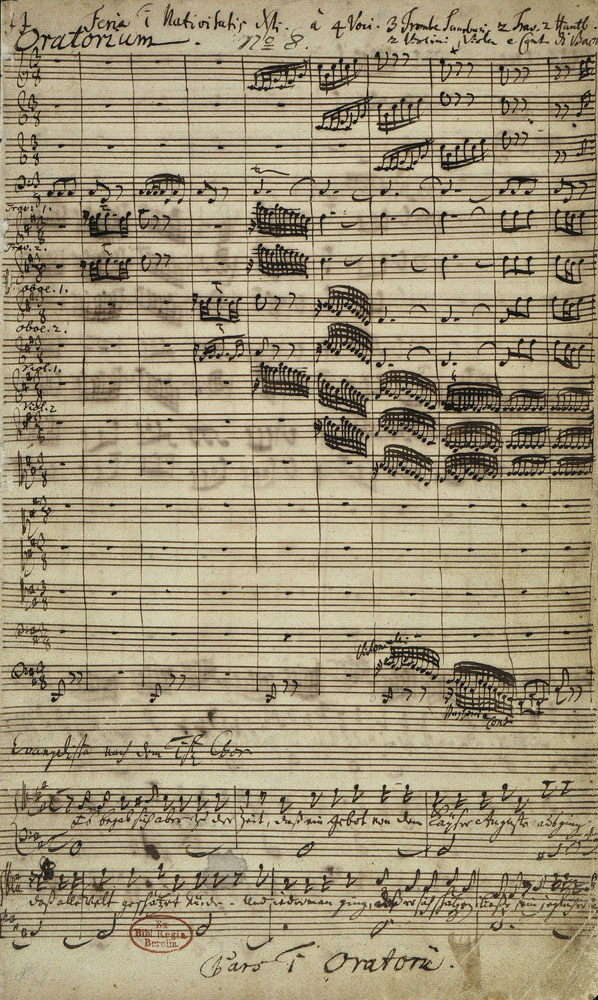
First page of the first part of Bach's Christmas Oratorio (1734)

This is a chronological list of oratorios from the 16th century to the present. Unless otherwise indicated, all dates are those when the work was first performed. In some cases only the date of composition is known. In others, the oratorio has only been heard on a recording.

There is considerable overlap between the oratorio and the cantata, especially during the 19th century. The works listed below are those that have most often been referred to as oratorios.

== 16th century ==
- Emilio de' Cavalieri – Rappresentatione di Anima, et di Corpo (1600)

== 17th century ==
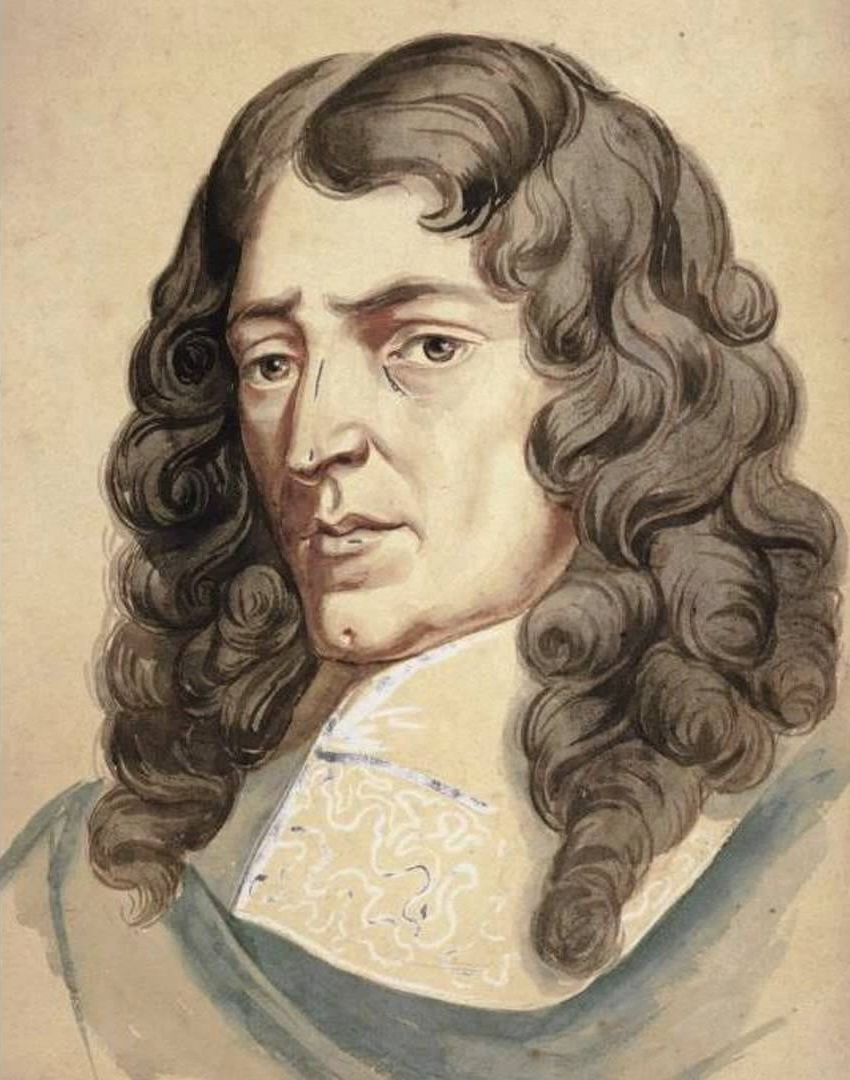
A recently discovered portrait, inscribed by the artist as representing Charpentier, but dating circa 1750, about 40 years after his death.

- Pietro della Valle – Oratorio della Purificatione (1640, the earliest documented use of the word "oratorio" to describe a musical composition)
- Cornelis Thymenszoon Padbrué – De tranen Petri ende Pauli (published 1647, only partial score survives)
- Giacomo Carissimi
  - Jephte (before 16 June 1648)
  - Baltazar (mid-17th century)
  - Diluvium universale (mid-17th century)
  - Dives malus (mid-17th century)
  - Ezechias (mid-17th century)
  - Jonas (mid-17th century)
  - Abramo e Isacco (mid-17th century)
  - Job (mid-17th century)
  - Judicium extremum (mid-17th century)
  - Judicium Salomonis (before 1669)
- Marc-Antoine Charpentier
  - Judith sive liberata H.391 (mid 1670s)
  - Canticum pro pace H.392 (mid 1670s)
  - Canticum in nativitatem Domini H.393 (mid 1670s)
  - In honorem Caecilliae, Valeriani et Tiburij canticum H.394 (mid 1670s)
  - Pour la fête de l'Epiphanie H.395 (mid 1670s)
  - Historia Esther H.396 (mid 1670s)
  - Cacillia virgo et martyr Octobre vocibus H.397 (mid 1670s)
  - Pestis Mediolanensis H.398 (mid 1670s)
  - Prélude pour Horrenda pastis H.398 a (1679)
  - Filius prodigus H.399 (1680)
  - Prélude pour l'enfant prodigue H.399 a (1681–82)
  - L'enfant prodigue H/399 b (date unknown)
  - L'enfant prodigue H.399 c (date unknown)
  - Canticum in honorem Beatae Virginis Mariae... H.400 (1680)
  - Extremum Dei judicium H.401 (early 1680s)
  - Sacrificium Abrahae H.402
  - Symphonies ajustées au sacrifice d'Abraham H.402 a (date unknown)
  - Le sacrifice d'Abraham H.402 b (date unknown)
  - Mors Saülis et Jonathae H.403 (early 1680s)
  - Josue prélude H.404 a (1679)
  - Josue H.404 (early 1680s)
  - In resurrectione Domini Nostri Jesu Christi H.405 (1681–82)
  - In circumcisione Domini / Dialogus inter angelum et pastores H.406 (1682–83)
  - Dialogus inter esurientem, sitientem et Christum H.407 (1682–83)
  - Elévation H.408 (1683)
  - In obitum augustissimae nec non piissime Gallorum regina lamentum H.409 (1683)
  - Praelium Michaelis Archangeli factum in cocho cum dracone H.410 (1683)
  - Caedes sanctorum innocentium H.411 (1683–85)
  - Nuptiae sacrae H.412 (1683–85)
  - Caecilia virgo et martyr H.413 (1683–85)
  - In nativitatem Domini Nostri Jesu Christi canticum H.414 (1683–85)
  - Caecilia virgo et martyr H.415 (1686)
  - Prologue de la Ste Cécile après l'ouverture : Harmonia coelistis H.415 a (1686–87)
  - In nativitatem Domini canticum H.416 (late 1680s)
  - Dialogus inter Christum et homines H.417 (early 1690s)
  - In honorem Sancti Ludovici regis Galliae H.418 (early 1690s)
  - Pour Saint Augustin mourant H.419 (late 1690s)
  - Dialogus inter angelos et pastores Judae in nativitatem Domini H.420 (late 1690s)
  - In nativitatem Domini Nostri Jesu Christi canticum H.421 (1698–99)
  - Judicium Salomonis H.422 & H.422 a (1702)
  - Dialogus inter Magdalena et Jesu 2 vocibus Canto e Alto cum organo H.423 (date unknown)
  - Le reniement de St Pierre H.424 (date unknown)
  - Dialogus inter Christum et peccatores H.425 & H.425 a date unknown)
- Louis-Nicolas Clérambault – L'histoire de la femme adultère (1699 ?) C.191
- Sébastien de Brossard – Dialogus poenitentis animae cum Deo (1699 ?) SdB.55

== 18th century ==
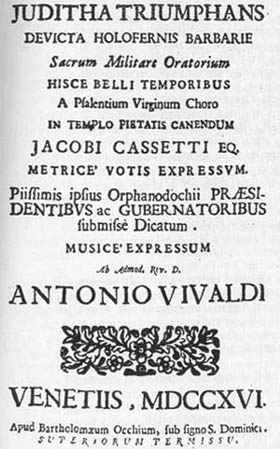
First edition of Vivaldi's Juditha triumphans, the only one of his four oratorios to have survived

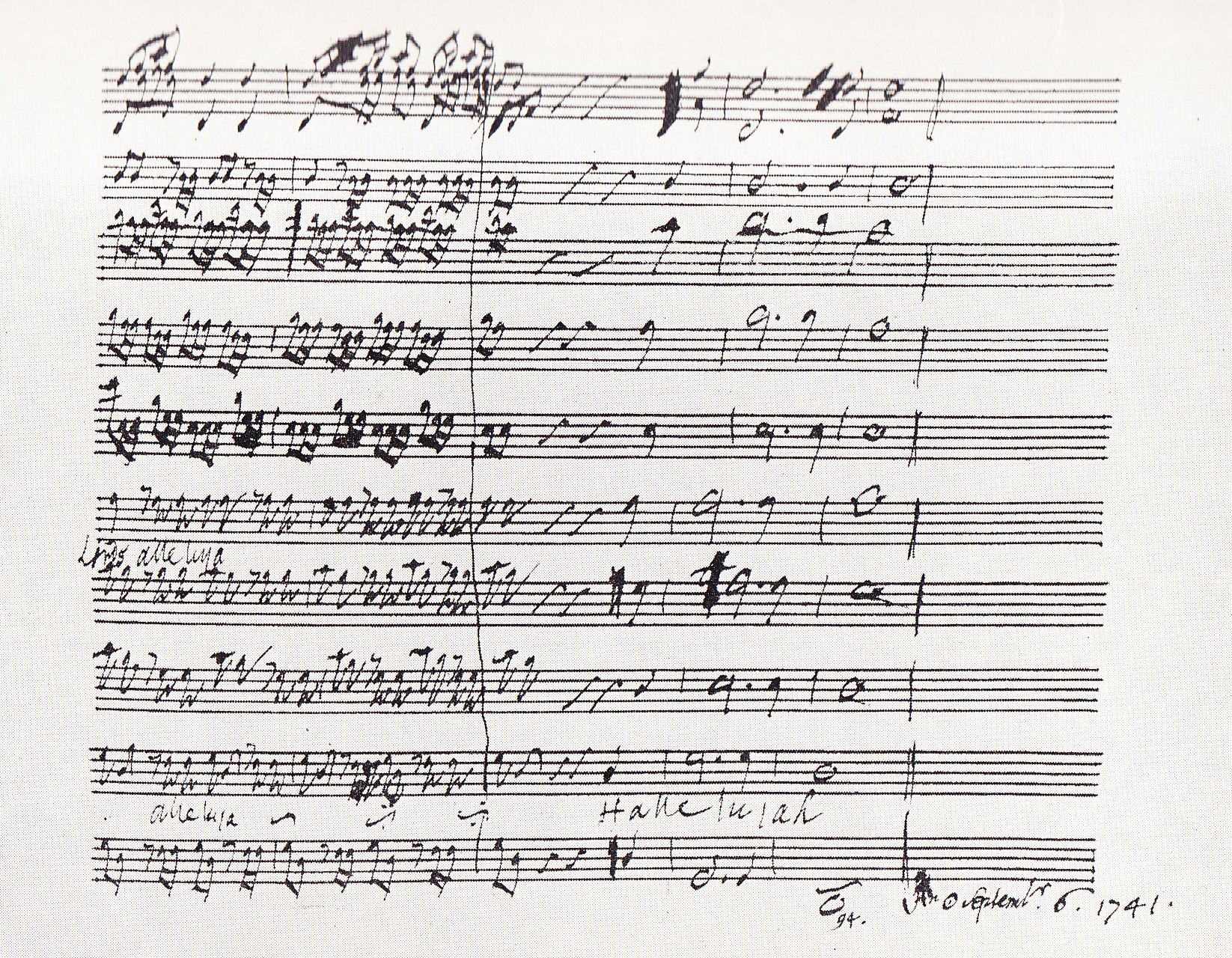
The final bars of the "Hallelujah" chorus, from Handel's Messiah, original manuscript

- Antonio Maria Bononcini – Il trionfo della grazia (Vienna 1707)
- George Frideric Handel – Il trionfo del Tempo e del Disinganno (1707)
- George Frideric Handel – La resurrezione (1708)
- Francesco Maria Veracini – Il trionfo della innocenza da S Niccolò (?1712)
- Sébastien de Brossard – Oratorio sopra l'immaculata conceptione della B Virgine (1702–1713) SdB.56
- George Frideric Handel – Brockes Passion (1715)
- Francesco Maria Veracini – Mosè al mar rosso, ovvero Il naufragio di Faraone (?1715; revised as La liberazione del popolo ebreo nel naufragio di Faraone, 1723)
- Antonio Vivaldi – Juditha triumphans (1716)
- Francesco Maria Veracini – L'incoronazione di Davidde (1717)
- Gottfried Heinrich Stölzel – Ein Lämmlein geht und trägt die Schuld, Passion Oratorio (1720)
- Francesco Maria Veracini – La caduta del savio nell'idoltria di Salomone (1720)
- Jan Dismas Zelenka – Sub olea pacis et palma virtutis (1723)
- Johann Sebastian Bach – St John Passion (1724)
- Francesco Bartolomeo Conti – David (1724)
- Johann David Heinichen – L'aride tempie ignude, passion oratorio (1724?)
- Francesco Maria Veracini – L'empietà distrutta nella caduta di Gerico (1724)
- Johann Sebastian Bach – Easter Oratorio (1725)
- Johann Sebastian Bach – St Matthew Passion (1727)
- Johann David Heinichen – Come? S'imbruna il cieli Occhi piangete (1728), passion oratorio (1724?)
- Gottfried Heinrich Stölzel – Christmas Oratorio (1728)
- Jan Dismas Zelenka – Il Serpente di Bronzo (1730)
- Willem de Fesch – Judith (1732)
- Maurice Greene – The Song of Deborah and Barak (1732)
- George Frideric Handel – Esther (1732)
- George Frideric Handel – Athalia (1733)
- George Frideric Handel – Deborah (1733)
- Johann Sebastian Bach – Christmas Oratorio (1734)
- Johann Adolph Hasse – Il cantico de' tre fanciulli (1734)
- Nicola Porpora – Davide e Bersabea (London, 1734)
- Johann Sebastian Bach – Ascension Oratorio (1735)
- Johann Georg Reutter – Gioas re di Giuda (1735)
- William Boyce – David's Lamentation over Saul and Jonathan (1736)
- George Frideric Handel – Alexander's Feast (1736)
- Jan Dismas Zelenka – I penitenti al sepolcro del redentore (1736)
- Maurice Greene – Jephtha (1737)
- George Frideric Handel – Il trionfo del Tempo e della Verità (1737)
- Johann Adolph Hasse – Le virtù appiè della croce (1737)
- Nicola Porpora – Il Gedeone (Vienna, 1737)
- George Frideric Handel – Israel in Egypt (1738)
- George Frideric Handel – Saul (1739)
- Giuseppe Bonno – Eleazaro (1739)
- Gregor Joseph Werner – Der Gute Hirt (1739)
- Giuseppe Bonno – San Paolo in Athene (1740)
- George Frideric Handel – L'Allegro, il Penseroso ed il Moderato (1740)
- Johann Adolph Hasse – Serpentes ignei in deserto (1740)
- John Christopher Smith – David's Lamentation over Saul and Jonathan (Hickman's Rooms, 1740)
- George Frideric Handel – Messiah (1741)
- George Frideric Handel – Samson (1741)
- Johann Adolph Hasse – Giuseppe riconosciuto (1741)
- Johann Adolph Hasse – I pellegrini al sepolcro di Nostro Signore (1742)
- George Frideric Handel – Joseph and his Brethren (1743)
- George Frideric Handel – Semele (1743)
- Thomas Arne – The Death of Abel (1744, lost except for 'Hymn of Eve')
- Thomas Arne – Judith (1744)
- Maurice Greene – The Force of Truth (1744)
- George Frideric Handel – Hercules (1744)
- Johann Adolph Hasse – Ci'l un parantê und parsol scelopgrini (1744)
- Francesco Maria Veracini – L'errore di Salomone (1744)
- Thomas Arne – Alfred (1745, oratorio version, later an opera)
- George Frideric Handel – Belshazzar (1745)
- Johann Adolph Hasse – La Caduta di Gerico (1745)
- Willem de Fesch – Joseph (1746)
- George Frideric Handel – Judas Maccabaeus (1746)
- George Frideric Handel – Occasional Oratorio (1746)
- George Frideric Handel – Joshua (1747)
- Johann Adolph Hasse – Santa Elena al Calvario (1747)
- George Frideric Handel – Alexander Balus (1748)
- George Frideric Handel – Solomon (1748)
- George Frideric Handel – Susanna (1748)
- Nicola Porpora – Il Verbo in carne (Dresden, 1748)
- Franz Xaver Richter – La Deposizione della Croce (1748)
- George Frideric Handel – Theodora (1749)
- George Frideric Handel – The Choice of Hercules (1750)
- William Hayes – The Fall of Jericho (c. 1740–50)
- William Hayes – The Passions. An Ode for Music ('dramatic oratorio', 1750)
- Jean-Joseph de Mondonville – Coeli enarrant gloria (1750)
- Johann Adolph Hasse – La conversione di Sant' Agostino (1750)
- George Frideric Handel – Jephtha (1752)
- Carl Heinrich Graun – Der Tod Jesu (1755)
- George Frideric Handel – The Triumph of Time and Truth (1757)
- John Stanley – Jephthah (1757)
- Johann Adolph Hasse – S. Petrus et S. Maria Magdalena (1759)
- Giuseppe Bonno – Isacco figura del redentore (1759)
- John Christopher Smith – Paradise Lost (1760)
- John Stanley – Zimiri (1760)
- Gregor Joseph Werner – Deborah (1760)
- Thomas Arne – Judith (1761)
- John Christopher Smith – Rebecca (1761, reworking of music by Handel)
- John Stanley – Arcadia (1762)
- Georg Philipp Telemann – Der Tag des Gerichts (1762)
- Johann Georg Albrechtsberger – La passione di Gesù Cristo (1762)
- George Frideric Handel – Nabal (1764)
- John Christopher Smith – Tobit (1764, reworking of music by Handel)
- John Worgan and Christopher Smart – Hannah (1764)
- Carl Ditters von Dittersdorf – Isacco figura del Redentore (1766)
- John Worgan – Manasseh (1766), performed at the Lock Hospital
- Tommaso Traetta – Rex Salomon (1766, rev. 1776)
- Wolfgang Amadeus Mozart – Die Schuldigkeit des ersten Gebots (1767, only the first part)
- Francesco Maria Veracini – L'Assalone, ovvero L'infedelta punita (before 1768)
- Samuel Arnold – Cure of Saul (1767)
- Samuel Arnold – Abimelech (1768)
- Michael Haydn – Der Kampf der Busse und Bekehrung (1768)
- Michael Haydn – Kaiser Constanstin I. Feldzug und Sieg (1769)
- George Frideric Handel – Gideon (1769)
- Carl Philipp Emanuel Bach – Die Israeliten in der Wüste (1769)
- Josef Mysliveček - Tobia (1769)
- Franz Joseph Aumann – Oratorium De Passione Domini Nostri Jesu Christi (c.1770)
- Johann Christian Bach – Gioas, re di Giuda (London, 1770)
- Carl Ditters von Dittersdorf – Davide penitente (1770)
- Michael Haydn – Der reumütige Petrus (1770)
- Michael Haydn – Der büssende Sünder (1771)
- Josef Mysliveček – Adamo ed Eva (1771)
- Florian Leopold Gassmann – La Betulia Liberata (1772)
- Samuel Arnold – The Prodigal Son (1773)
- Luffman Atterbury – Goliah (5 May 1773, Haymarket Theatre, London)
- Josef Mysliveček - La passione di Gesù Cristo (1773)
- Charles Avison (in collaboration with Felice Giardini) – Ruth (1773)
- Johann Christoph Friedrich Bach – Die Auferweckung des Lazarus (1773)
- Carl Ditters von Dittersdorf – La Liberatrice del Popolo Giudaico nella Persia, o sia l'Esther (1773)
- Samuel Arnold – Omnipotence (1774)
- Giuseppe Bonno – Il Giuseppe riconosciuto (1774)
- John Stanley – The Fall of Egypt (1774)
- Joseph Haydn – Il ritorno di Tobia (1775)
- James Hook – The Ascension, (Covent Garden, 20 March 1776)
- Josef Mysliveček - Isacco, figura del redentore (1776)
- Antonio Salieri – La passione di Gesù Cristo (1776)
- Joseph Martin Kraus – Der Tod Jesu (1776)
- John Abraham Fisher – Providence (Sheldonian Theatre, Oxford, 2 July 1777)
- William Hayes – David (first two acts completed, the rest finished by his son Philip (1777)
- Thomas Linley the younger – The Song of Moses (1777)
- Robert Wainwright – The Fall of Egypt (1780, Liverpool)
- Marianna Martines – Sant'Elena al Calvario (1781)
- Marianna Martines – Isacco figura del redentore (1782)
- Wolfgang Amadeus Mozart – Davide penitente (1785)
- Antonio Rosetti – Der sterbende Jesu (1785)
- Anton Teyber – Gioas re di Giuda (1786)
- Carl Ditters von Dittersdorf – Giobbe (1786)
- Antonio Rosetti – Jesus in Gethsemane (1790)
- Joseph Eybler – Die Hirten bei der krippe zu Bethlehem (1794)
- Antonio Casimir Cartellieri – Gioas re di Giuda (1795)
- Joseph Haydn – The Seven Last Words of Christ (1796)
- Joseph Haydn – The Creation (1798)

== 19th century ==
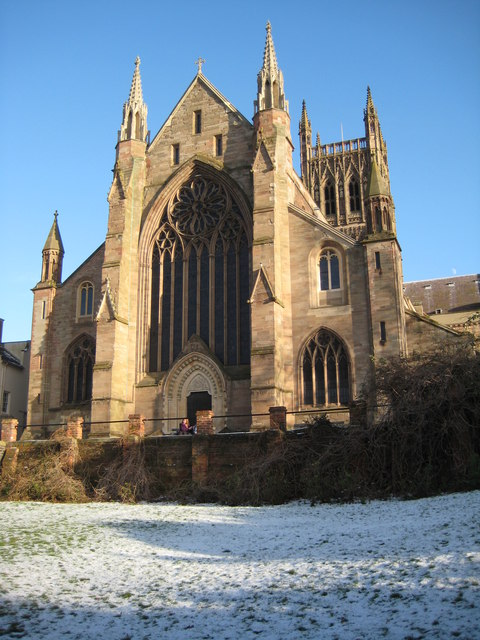
Worcester Cathedral, where Sullivan's The Prodigal Son premiered in 1869

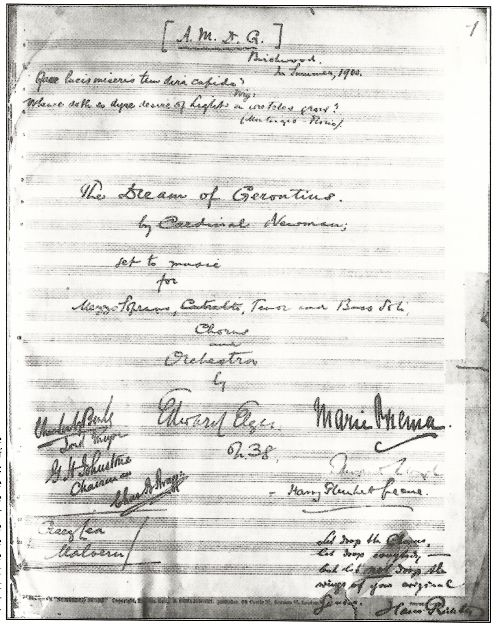
Manuscript score of Elgar's The Dream of Gerontius, signed by Elgar and the performers of the premiere in 1900

- Joseph Haydn – The Seasons (1801)
- Christian Ernst Graf – Der Tod Jesu (1802)
- Friedrich Witt – Der leidende Heiland (1802)
- Ludwig van Beethoven – Christ on the Mount of Olives (1803, rev. 1804, 1811)
- Ferdinando Paer – Il Santo Sepolcro (1803)
- Antonio Casimir Cartellieri – La celebre Nativita del Redentore (1806)
- Antonio Casimir Cartellieri – La purificatione di Maria Virgine (1807)
- Ferdinando Paer – La Passione di Gesu Cristo (1810)
- Joseph Eybler – Die vier letzten Dinge (1810)
- Giacomo Meyerbeer – Gott und die Natur (1811, Berlin)
- William Crotch – Palestine (1812)
- Maximilian Stadler Die Befreyung von Jerusalem (1813)
- George Perry – Elijah and the Priests of Baal (1818)
- Friedrich Schneider – Das Weltgericht (1819)
- Franz Schubert – Lazarus (composed 1820, unfinished)
- Simon Mayr – Gioas (1823)
- Friedrich Schneider – Verlorne Paradies (1824)
- Louis Spohr – Die letzten Dinge (1826, translated as The Last Judgement 1830)
- Pietro Raimondi – Giuditta (premiered 1827, Naples)
- Bernhard Klein – Jephtha (1828, Cologne)
- Friedrich Schneider – Pharao (1828)
- Peter Josef von Lindpaintner – Der Jüngling von Nain (1829, English version The Widow of Nain, 1850s)
- Friedrich Schneider – Christus das Kind (1829)
- Friedrich Schneider – Gideon (1829)
- Philip Trajetta – Jerusalem in Affliction (1828, Philadelphia)
- Philip Trajetta – Daughter of Zion (1829, Philadelphia)
- Bernhard Klein – David (1830, Halle)
- Sigismund von Neukomm – Mount Sinai (1832)
- Mary Linwood – David’s First Victory (1833, St. Paul's Chapel, Birmingham)
- Pietro Raimondi – Rut (premiered 1833)
- Henry Bishop – The Seventh Day (1834)
- William Crotch – The Captivity of Judah (1834)
- Sigismund von Neukomm – David (Birmingham Festival, 1834)
- Louis Spohr – Des Heilands letzte Stunden (Calvary) (1834–35)
- Felix Mendelssohn – St. Paul (1836)
- Friedrich Schneider – Getsemane und Golgotha (1838)
- Henry Bishop – The Fallen Angel (1839)
- Ferdinand Hiller – Die Zerstörung Jerusalems (1840)
- Louis Spohr – Der Fall Babylons (The Fall of Babylon) (1842, Norwich Festival)
- Pietro Raimondi – Il Giudizio universale (composed 1842/43, premiered 1843)
- Robert Schumann – Das Paradies und die Peri (1843)
- William Jackson – The Deliverance of Israel from Babylon, (c 1845)
- Hector Berlioz – La damnation de Faust (1846)
- Félicien David – Moïse au Sinaï ('Moses on Sinai') (1846)
- Pietro Raimondi – Mosè al Sinai (1846)
- César Franck – Ruth (1846)
- Felix Mendelssohn – Elijah (1846)
- George Perry – Hezekiah (1847)
- Felix Mendelssohn – Christus (composed 1847, unfinished (premiered posthumously 1852)
- Pietro Raimondi – Giuseppe (Triplo Oratorio) (composed 1847/48, premiered 1852)
- Félicien David – Eden (1848)
- Charles Edward Horsley – David, Op.30 (1850)
- William Richard Bexfield – Israel Restored (composed 1851, premiered Norwich Festival, 1852)
- William Jackson – Isaiah (1851)
- Robert Schumann – Der Rose Pilgerfahrt (1851)
- Henry Hugh Pierson – Jerusalem, (1852, Norwich Festival)
- Charles Edward Horsley – Joseph, Op.39 (1853)
- Robert Schumann – Scenes from Goethe's Faust (composed 1853, premiered posthumously 1862)
- Hector Berlioz – L'enfance du Christ (1854)
- Charles Gounod – Tobie (1854)
- John Griesbach – Daniel (Sacred Harmonic Society, 30 June 1854)
- Henry Leslie – Immanuel (1854)
- Frederick Ouseley – The Martyrdom of St Polycarp (1854)
- Ann Mounsey Bartholomew – The Nativity, Op. 29, pastoral oratorio (1855)
- Michael Costa – Eli (1855)
- Charles Gounod – Les Sept Paroles de Notre Seigneur Jésus-Christ sur la Croix (1855)
- George William Torrance – Abraham (1855)
- Henry Leslie – Judith 1858)
- Camille Saint-Saëns – Oratorio de Noël (1858)
- Anton Rubinstein – Paradise Lost (1859), "sacred opera")
- Henry Hiles – David (1860)
- Charles Edward Horsley – Gideon (1860, Glasgow Music Festival)
- Bernhard Molique – Abraham, op. 65 (1860)
- Alfred Gaul – Hezekiah(1861)
- Charles Sandys Packer – Crown of Thorns (1863)
- Michael Costa – Naaman (1864)
- George William Torrance – The Captivity (1864)
- Cesar Franck – La Tour de Babel (1865)
- Franz Liszt – Die Legende von der heiligen Elisabeth (1865)
- John Stainer – Gideon (1865)
- Peter Benoit – Lucifer (1866)
- Henry Hiles – The Patriarchs (1866)
- Théodore Dubois – Les Sept Paroles du Christ (1867)
- William Sterndale Bennett – The Woman of Samaria (1867, Birmingham Festival)
- Peter Benoit – De Schelde (1868)
- Henry Litolff – Ruth et Boaz (1869)
- Arthur Sullivan – The Prodigal Son (1869)
- Otto Goldschmidt – Ruth (1870)
- Anton Rubinstein – The Tower of Babel (1870, "sacred opera")
- Julius Benedict – St Peter (1870, Birmingham Festival)
- Edmund Chipp – Naomi: A Sacred Idyll (1870)
- William Cusins – Gideon (1871, Gloucester)
- William Carter – Placida, the Christian Martyr (1872)
- John Knowles Paine – St Peter (1872 - "America's first oratorio")
- Peter Benoit – De oorlog (1869–73)
- John Francis Barnett – The Raising of Lazarus (New Philharmonic Society, London, 18 June 1873)
- Franz Liszt – Christus (1873)
- George Alexander Macfarren – St John the Baptist (1873, Bristol Festival)
- Jules Massenet – Marie-Magdeleine (1873)
- Frederick Ouseley – Hagar (1873, Hereford Festival)
- Edouard Silas – Joash (1873, Norwich Festival)
- Henry Smart – Jacob (1873, Glasgow Festival)
- Arthur Sullivan – The Light of the World (1873)
- Max Bruch – Odysseus (1873)
- Frederick Bridge – Mount Moriah (1874)
- César Franck – Rédemption (1874)
- Edmund Chipp – Job (1875)
- Jules Massenet – Ève (1875)
- Charles Swinnerton Heap – The Captivity (1875, Birmingham Town Hall)
- Charles Villiers Stanford – The Resurrection (1875)
- Henry Gadsby – Alcestis (1876)
- George Alexander Macfarren – The Resurrection (1876, Birmingham Festival)
- Camille Saint-Saëns – Le Déluge (1876)
- Max Bruch – Arminius (1877)
- John Liptrot Hatton – Hezekiah (1877, Crystal Palace)
- George Alexander Macfarren – Joseph (1877, Leeds Festival)
- Philip Armes – Hezekiah (1878)
- Frederic Hymen Cowen – The Deluge, (1878, Brighton Festival)
- Théodore Dubois – Le Paradis Perdu, (1878)
- John Stainer – The Daughter of Jairus (1878)
- César Franck – Les Béatitudes (composed 1879, premiered posthumously 1893)
- Benjamin Godard – Diane, Op.52 (1880)
- Arthur Sullivan – The Martyr of Antioch (1880)
- Jules Massenet – La Vierge (1880)
- Philip Armes – St. John the Evangelist (1881)
- Alfred Gaul – The Holy City (1882)
- Charles Gounod – La rédemption (1882)
- Joachim Raff – Welt-Ende – Gericht – Neue Welt, op. 212 (1882)
- George William Torrance – The Revelation (1882, Melbourne)
- Joseph Barnby – Rebekah (1883)
- George Alexander Macfarren – King David (1883, Leeds Festival)
- John Stainer – Mary Magdalen (1883)
- Alexander Mackenzie – The Rose of Sharon (1884, Norwich Festival)
- Charles Gounod – Mors et vita (1885)
- Dudley Buck – The Light of Asia (composed 1886 (premiered 1887)
- Antonín Dvořák – Saint Ludmila (1886, Leeds Festival)
- W. S. Rockstro – The Good Shepherd (1886, Three Choirs Festival)
- Marie Emmanuel Augustin Savard – La Vision de Saül (1886)
- Charles Villiers Stanford – The Three Holy Children (1886, Birmingham Festival)
- Charles Vincent – Ruth (December 1886, Hampstead)
- Giovanni Bottesini – The Garden of Olivet (1887, Norwich Festival)
- Frederic Hymen Cowen – Ruth (1887, Three Choirs Festival)
- Luigi Mancinelli – Isaias (1887, Norwich Festival)
- John Stainer – The Crucifixion (1887)
- Hubert Parry – Judith (1888, Birmingham Festival)
- William Spark – Immanuel (1889)
- Frederick Bridge – The Repentance of Nineveh (1890, Worcester Festival)
- Edgar Tinel – St Francis (1890)
- Philip Armes – St Barnabas (1891, Durham Cathedral)
- Charles Gounod – Saint Francois d'Assise (1891)
- Emma Mundella – The Victory of Song (1891)
- Charles Villiers Stanford – Eden (1891, dramatic oratorio)
- Paul Gilson – Francesca da Rimini (1892)
- Alexander Mackenzie – Bethlehem (1892)
- Percy Hilder Miles – Joseph (1892)
- Hubert Parry – Job (1892, Gloucester Festival)
- Horatio Parker – Hora Novissima (1893)
- Heinrich von Herzogenberg – Die Geburt Christi, op. 90 (1894)
- Hubert Parry – King Saul (1894, Birmingham Festival)
- Max Bruch – Moses (1895)
- Edward Elgar – The Light of Life (Lux Christi) (1896)
- Willard Patton (1853–1924) – Isaiah (1897)
- Lorenzo Perosi – La Passione di Cristo (1897)
- Henry Walford Davies – Days of Man (1897)
- Lorenzo Perosi – La Trasfigurazione di Cristo (1898)
- Lorenzo Perosi – La Risurrezione di Lazzaro (1898)
- Lorenzo Perosi – La Risurrezione di Cristo (1898)
- Lorenzo Perosi – Il Natale del Redentore (1899)
- Felix Draeseke – Christus. Mysterium in a Prelude and Three Oratorios (1899)
- Frederic Hymen Cowen – Jephthah (1900, unfinished)
- Horatio-Parker – A Wanderer's Psalm (1900, Hereford Festival)
- Lorenzo Perosi – L'entrata di Cristo in Gerusalemme (1900)
- Lorenzo Perosi – La Strage degli Innocenti (1900)
- Lorenzo Perosi – Mosè (1900)
- Jules Massenet – La Terre Promise (1900)
- Edward Elgar – The Dream of Gerontius (1900)

== 20th century ==
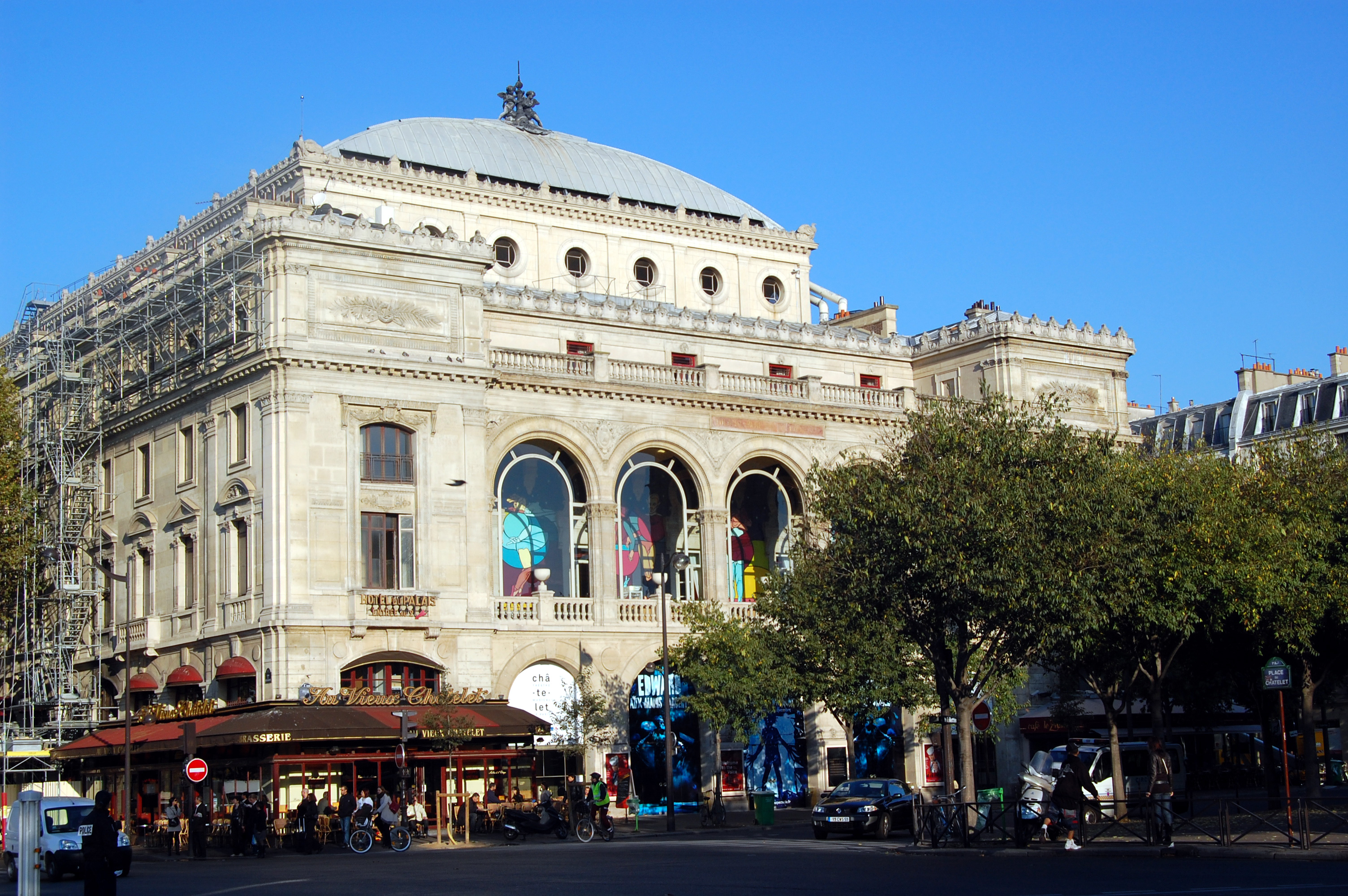
The Théâtre du Châtelet in Paris, where John Adams's El Niño premiered in 2000

- Horatio Parker – Legend of St Christopher (1902, Worcester Festival)
- Henry Walford Davies – The Temple, (1902, Worcester Festival)
- Edward Elgar – The Apostles (1903)
- Samuel Coleridge-Taylor – The Atonement (1903, Hereford Festival, rev. 1905)
- Lorenzo Perosi – Stabat Mater (1904)
- Lorenzo Perosi – Il Giudizio Universale (1904)
- Lorenzo Perosi – Dies Iste (1904)
- Henry Walford Davies – Everyman (1904)
- Edward Elgar – The Kingdom (1906)
- David Evans – Llawenhewch yn yr Iôr (1906, Caernarfon Festival)
- Lorenzo Perosi – Transitus Animae (1907)
- Granville Bantock – Christ in the Wilderness (1907, Gloucester Festival)
- Gabriel Pierné – Les enfants à Bethléem (1907)
- Granville Bantock – Omar Khayyám (1906–09)
- Alick Maclean – The Annunciation (1909), performed Scarborough, 1920
- Lorenzo Perosi – In Patris Memoriam (1909)
- Granville Bantock – Gethsemane (1910, Gloucester Festival)
- Frederic Hymen Cowen – The Veil (Cardiff Festival, 20 September 1910)
- Lorenzo Perosi – Vespertina Oratio (1912)
- Carlo Diacono – St Paul (1913)
- Lorenzo Perosi – Le Sette Parole di Nostro Signore Gesu' Cristo sulla Croce (1913)
- Lorenzo Perosi – La Samaritana (1913)
- Camille Saint-Saëns – The Promised Land (1913)
- Arthur Somervell – The Passion of Christ (1914)
- Granville Bantock – Song of Songs (1912–15)
- George Enescu – Strigoii (Ghosts) (1916)
- Lorenzo Perosi – In Diebus Tribolationis (1916)
- Edgar Stillman Kelley – The Pilgrim's Progress (Cincinnati, 1918)
- Erik Satie – Socrate (1920)
- Arthur Honegger – Le roi David (1921)
- Arnold Schoenberg – Die Jakobsleiter (composed 1922, revised 1944, unfinished)
- Zoltan Kodaly: Psalmus Hungaricus (1923)
- Hermann Suter – Le Laudi (1924)
- Ralph Vaughan Williams – Sancta Civitas (The Holy City) (1926)
- Lucien Haudebert – Dieu vainqueur (1927, Mannheim)
- Igor Stravinsky – Oedipus rex (1927)
- Lorenzo Perosi – Il Sogno Interpretato (1928)
- Robin Milford – A Prophet in the Land (1929, Three Choirs Festival 1931)
- Johanna Müller-Hermann – Lied der Erinnerung: In Memoriam (1930)
- Lorenzo Perosi – In Fratris Memoriam (1930)
- George Dyson – The Canterbury Pilgrims (1931)
- Paul Hindemith – Das Unaufhörliche (1931)
- William Walton – Belshazzar's Feast (1931)
- Paul Ben-Haim – Joram (1931–33)
- Arthur Honegger – Jeanne d'Arc au bûcher (1935)
- William Alwyn – The Marriage of Heaven and Hell (1936, fp. 18 February 2023, King's College London Chapel)
- Lennox Berkeley – Jonah 1936, Leeds Festival (1937)
- Robert Nathaniel Dett – The Ordering of Moses (1937, revived 2014, Cincinnati)
- Lorenzo Perosi – In Transitu Sancti Patris Nostri Francisci (1937)
- Lorenzo Perosi – Natalitia (1937)
- Herbert Howells – Hymnus Paradisi (composed 1936–38, premiered 1950)
- Franz Schmidt – The Book with Seven Seals (1938)
- Jean Françaix – L’Apocalypse selon Saint-Jean – Oratorio fantastique (1939–42)
- Ahmed Adnan Saygun – Yunus Emre (1942)
- Frank Martin – Le Vin herbé (1942)
- Martin Shaw – The Redeemer (1944)
- Michael Tippett – A Child of Our Time (1944)
- William Wordsworth – Dies Domini (1944)
- Frank Martin – In terra pax (1945)
- Francis de Bourguignon – La Nuit (1945)
- Paul Hindemith – When Lilacs Last in the Dooryard Bloom'd (1946)
- Karl Schiske - Vom Tode (1946)
- William Lloyd Webber – St. Francis of Assisi (1948)
- Frank Martin – Golgotha (1949)
- Dmitri Shostakovich – Song of the Forests (1949)
- Ernst Hermann Meyer – Mansfeld Oratorio (1950)
- Lorenzo Perosi – Il Nazareno (1950)
- Sergei Prokofiev – On Guard for Peace (1950)
- Arwel Hughes – Dewi Sant (1951), commissioned for the Festival of Britain
- Heitor Villa-Lobos – Symphony No. 10, Sumé pater patrium: Sinfonia ameríndia com coros (Oratorio) (1952–53)
- Léo Ferré – La Chanson du mal-aimé (1954, revised 1972)
- Alfred Uhl - Gilgamesch (1954/56, revised 1967/68)
- Hans Vogt – Die Stadt hinter dem Strom (opera-oratorio) (1955)
- Vadim Salmanov – The Twelve (1957)
- Bohuslav Martinů – The Epic of Gilgamesh (1958)
- Alfred Schnittke – Nagasaki (1958)
- Frank Martin – Le Mystère de la Nativité (1960)
- Benjamin Britten – War Requiem (1961-2)
- Daniel Jones – St Peter (1962)
- Raymond Warren – The Passion (1962)
- Mordecai Seter – Midnight Vigil (1963, revised 1984)
- Arwel Hughes – Pantycelyn (1964), National Eisteddfod, Swansea
- Herman D. Koppel – Moses (1963–64)
- Federico Mompou – Los Improperios (1964, expanded 1966-8)
- Ron Nelson – What is Man? (1964)
- Mikis Theodorakis – Axion Esti (1964)
- Thérèse Brenet – Clamavit (1965)
- Herman D. Koppel – Requiem (1966)
- Krzysztof Penderecki – St Luke Passion (1966)
- Dave Brubeck – The Light in the Wilderness (University of North Carolina, 1968)
- Hans Werner Henze – Das Floß der Medusa (1968)
- Raymond Warren – Songs of Unity (1968)
- Mikis Theodorakis – The March of the Spirit (1969)
- James Furman – I Have a Dream (1970)
- John Golland – The Word Made Flesh, (Christmas oratorio), op. 24 (fp Hyde, Cheshire, 14 December 1970)
- George Newson – Arena, a 'staged oratorio', (fp Roundhouse, 6 September 1971)
- Dmitry Kabalevsky – A Letter to the 30th Century, Op. 93, (1972)
- Darius Milhaud – Saint-Louis, roi de France (1972)
- Herman D. Koppel – Lovsange (1973)
- Patric Standford – Christus Requiem (1973)
- Mikis Theodorakis – Canto General (1974)
- Michael Hurd – Hip Hip Horatio (1975)
- Joseph Horovitz – Samson, for baritone, mixed chorus and brass band (1977)
- Inglis Gundry – The Daytime of Christ (1978)
- Anthony Hedges – The Temple of Solomon, Op. 78 (1979, fp. Huddersfield Choral Society, 1982)
- Howard Blake – Benedictus (Song of Zechariah) (1980)
- Undine Smith Moore – Scenes from the Life of a Martyr (1981, Pulitzer Prize nominated)
- Charles Wuorinen – The Celestial Sphere (1981)
- Olle Elgenmark – Ordet vart kött (The Word was made Flesh) (1982)
- Roger Marsh – Samson, a dramatic oratorio (1984)
- Charles Camilleri – Pawlu ta' Malta (1985)
- Mauricio Kagel – Sankt-Bach-Passion (1985)
- Peter Schickele – Oedipus Tex (composed 1985, premiered 1986)
- Samuel Adler – The Binding (1986)
- Ronald Senator – Holocaust Requiem (1986, Canterbury)
- Somei Satoh – Stabat Mater (1987)
- Colin Touchin – Hilarion (1987)
- Raymond Warren – Continuing Cities (1989)
- Samuel Adler – Choose Life (1991)
- Naji Hakim – Saul de Tarse (1991)
- Paul McCartney – Liverpool Oratorio (1991)
- Richard Shephard – There Was Such Beauty (1991, Gloucester Cathedral)
- Mikis Theodorakis- Canto Olympico (1991)
- René Clemencic – Kabbala (1992)
- Michael Garrick – Bovingdon Poppies for chorus, soloists, jazz sextet and strings (1993)
- Geoffrey Poole – Blackbird (1993)
- Mona Lyn Reese – Choose Life, Uvacharta Bachayim (1994)
- Richard Einhorn – Voices of Light (1994)
- Kay Gardner – Ouroboros: Seasons of Life (1994)
- Bob Farrell and Greg Nelson – Saviour (1994)
- Elliot Goldenthal – Fire Water Paper: A Vietnam Oratorio (1995)
- Samuel Jones – The Temptation of Jesus (Text, Holy Scriptures/Thomas Merton) (1995)
- Will Todd – Saint Cuthbert (1995)
- Michael McLean – The Garden (1995)
- Antonio Braga – San Domenico di Guzman (1997)
- Anders Eliasson - Dante Anarca (1998)
- Matthew King – Gethsemane (1998)
- Francis Pott – A Song on the End of World (Three Choirs Festival, 1999, revived 2023)
- Raymond Warren – St. John Passion (Were You There?), passion setting with spirituals (1999)
- John Adams – El Niño (2000)
- Steve Elcock – Spei Cantus, op.9 (2000)
- Osvaldo Golijov – 'La Pasión según San Marcos (2000)
- Paul Spicer – Easter Oratorio (2000)

== 21st century ==
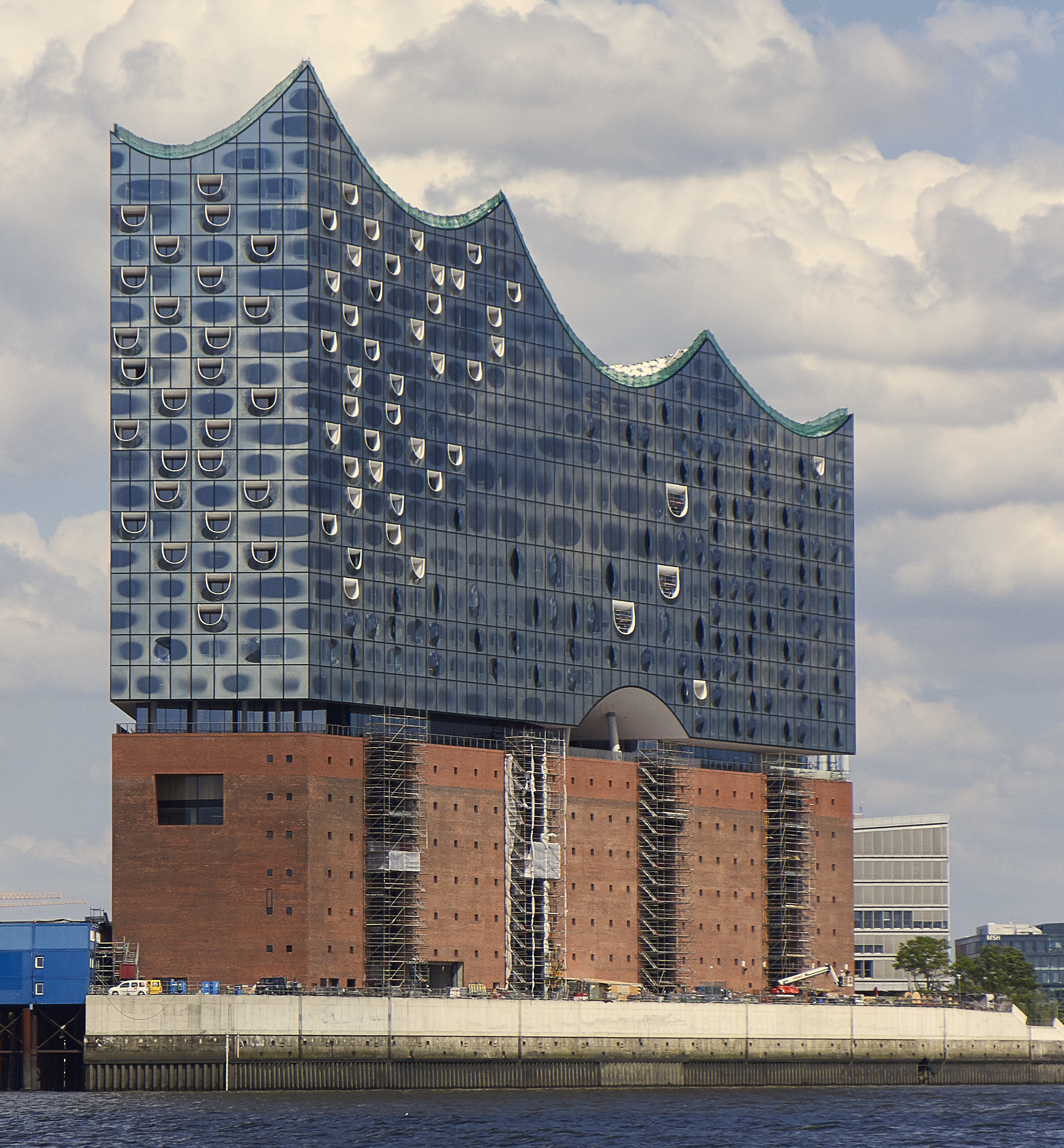
Elbphilharmonie in Hamburg, where Jörg Widmann's Arche premiered in 2017

- Nigel Butterley – Spell of Creation (2001, text Kathleen Raine)
- Jacob ter Veldhuis – Paradiso Oratorio (2001)
- Anthony Davis – Restless Mourning (2002), commemorating the 9/11 attacks
- Nathan Currier – Gaian Variations (2004)
- Piotr Rubik – Oratorium Świętokrzyska Golgota (2004)
- Fredrik Sixten – A Swedish St Mark Passion (2004)
- Nicholas Simpson – Recreation (2004)
- Sally Lutyens – First Light: An Oratorio (2005)
- Ilaiyaraaja – Thiruvasakam (2005)
- Piotr Rubik – Tu Es Petrus (2005)
- Julian Anderson – Heaven is Shy of Earth (2006, BBC Proms)
- Howard Blake – The Passion of Mary (2006)
- Paul McCartney – Ecce Cor Meum (2006)
- Francis Pott – The Cloud of Unknowing (2006)
- Piotr Rubik – Oratorium Psałterz Wrześniowy (2006)
- Kaija Saariaho – La Passion de Simone (2006)
- Eric Idle and John Du Prez – Not the Messiah (He's a Very Naughty Boy) (2007)
- Ted Hearne – Katrina Ballads (2007)
- Fredrik Sixten – Requiem (2007)
- Paul Moravec – The Blizzard Voices (2008)
- Antony Pitts – Jerusalem-Yerushalayim (2008)
- Steven Stucky and Gene Scheer – 4 August 1964 (2008)
- Jonathan Dove – There was a child (2009)
- Richard Einhorn – The Origin (2009)
- Fredrik Sixten – A Swedish Christmas Oratorio (2009)
- Paul Spicer – Advent Oratorio (2009)
- Donald Reid Womack – Voices of Kalaupapa (2009)
- Kitty Brazelton – Ecclesiastes: A Modern Oratorio (2010)
- Rob Gardner – Lamb of God (2010)
- Dinesh Subasinghe – Karuna Nadee (2010)
- Jonathan Harvey, Hans Küng (libretto) – Weltethos; (premiered 2011)
- John Adams – The Gospel According to the Other Mary (2012)
- Colin Touchin – Choose the Light (2012, Coventry Mysteries Festival)
- Philip Wilby – The Holy Face (2013, first performance 2017)
- Neil Hannon – To our Fathers' in Distress (2014)
- Ted Hearne – The Source (2014)
- Julia Wolfe – Anthracite Fields (2014)
- Stacy Garrop – Terra Nostra (2015)
- Jóhann Jóhannsson – Drone Mass (2015, "a contemporary oratorio")
- Nico Muhly – Sentences (2015)
- Mark Simpson – The Immortal (Bridgewater Hall, Manchester, 2015)
- Fredrik Sixten – St John Passion (2015)
- Jonathan Dove – A Brief History of Creation (2016)
- Craig Hella Johnson – Considering Matthew Shepard (2016)
- Peter Reulein and Helmut Schlegel – Laudato si' (2016)
- Anthony Ritchie – Gallipoli to the Somme (2016)
- Thomas Gabriel – Bruder Martin (2017)
- Jörg Widmann – Arche (2017)
- Artur Cieślak – Niepodległa (2018)
- Paul Moravec – Sanctuary Road (2018)
- Roxanna Panufnik – Faithful Journey, a Mass for Poland (2018, fp. Katowice, 9/11/18)
- Philip Sawyers – Mayflower on the Sea of Time (2018)
- Julia Wolfe – Fire in my mouth (2018)
- Bob Chilcott – Christmas Oratorio (Three Choirs Festival, 2019)
- Simon Franglen – The Birth of Skies and Earth (2019)
- James MacMillan – A Christmas Oratorio (2019, fp. Amsterdam, 2021)
- Caroline Shaw – The Listeners (2019)
- Wadada Leo Smith – Rosa Parks: Pure Love. An Oratorio of Seven Songs (2019)
- Malcolm Dedman – Nine-Pointed Star (2019/20)
- Karin Rehnqvist – Silent Earth (2020, fp. 29 January 2022, Amsterdam)
- Daniel Knaggs – Two Streams/Dwa Zdroje, (Houston, TX September 9, 2021; Polish version: Torun, Poland October 16, 2021)
- Peter Reulein and Bernhard Kießig – Eins (2021)
- Dwight Bigler – Mosaic for Earth (April 2022)
- Fredrik Sixten – St Matthew Passion (2022)
- Luke Styles – Voices of Power (Three Choirs Festival, fp 28 July 2022)
- Kate Whitley – Our Future In Your Hands (Buxton Festival, fp 10 July 2022)
- Julia Wolfe – Her Story (Nashville, 15 September 2022)
- Stefan Klaverdal – Vid Porten (At the Gate), (fp. Lund Cathedral, 16 October 2023)
- Sean Shepherd – On a Clear Day (An einem Klaren Tag), oratorio for orchestra, cello & choirs (2023)
- Julia Wolfe – unEarth (fp. New York City, June 1, 2023; London premiere 23/1/26, Barbican)
- Aaron Zigman – Émigré (Shanghai, 17 November 2023)
- Fredrik Sixten – Stabat Mater (2024)
- Patrick Hawes – The Son of Man (Houston, 21 September 2024)
- Jocelyn Hagen and Timothy C. Takach – Rose Ever Blooming (2025)

== See also ==
- La passione di Gesù Cristo for a list of composers who have set oratorios to this libretto by Metastasio, originally written in 1730
- Betulia liberata for a list of composers who have set oratorios to this libretto by Metastasio, originally written in 1734
- Der Tod Jesu for a list of composers who have set oratorios to this libretto by Karl Wilhelm Ramler, originally written in 1755
- La Giuditta for a list of composers who have written oratorios based on the Book of Judith
- List of oratorios at IMSLP
