= Fredrik Sixten =

Swedish musician (born 1962)

Sven Fredrik Johannes Sixten (born 21 October 1962) is a Swedish composer, cathedral organist and conductor. Sixten was born in Skövde, Sweden. He earned his Bachelor of Arts (1986) at the Royal College of Music, Stockholm. He studied composition with Professor Sven-David Sandström and is now recognized as one of Sweden's best-known composers of church music. He is published at all major publishing houses in Sweden.

He was the conductor of Gothenburg's boys choir between 1997 and 2001. Today he is the cathedral organist of Härnösand's Cathedral. His music is represented on several CD recordings and as a conductor one of his five CDs went gold. His music has been performed on Swedish Radio, e.g. his En svensk Markuspassion for two choirs, chamber orchestra and soloists (2004). The Jazz mass was performed 1999 on Swedish television.

== Partial list of works ==
- 5 hymns for the Church of Sweden's Hymnal
- Jazz Mass
- Stabat Mater for cello solo and choir (SSAA)
- Ave verum corpus
- O magnum mysterium
- Laudate Dominum
- O sacrum convivium
- Credo
- Pie Jesu
- Mariahymn
- Ropa ut din glädje, dotter Sion! (Daughter of Zion, rejoice!)
- Döden tänkte jag mig så
- Vår Fader (Our Father)
- Bana väg för Herren (Prepare the way of the Lord)
- Var inte rädd för mörkret (Be not afraid of the dark)
- Marias vaggvisa
- Requiem for string orchestra, 2 horns and timpani, choir and two soloists (soprano and bass) – also published in an English version.
- Cantata for the St. Lucia for choir, soprano solo and string orchestra (1984)
- Sonatas for violin and piano, and cello and piano (1985)
- String Quartet (1985)
- Prelude et Fugue (1986)
- Messa Misteriosa (2002) for solo organ
- Triptyk (2004)
- En svensk Markuspassion (A Swedish St. Mark Passion) for two choirs, chamber orchestra and soloists (2004)
- Sonata for organ (2006)
- Chaconne for string quartet (2007)
- Three sacred Dances for choir (SSAA), string quartet and piano (2007)
