= Jephte (Carissimi) =

Plorate filii Israel

Jephte or Historia di Jephte is an important exemplar of the mid-17th-century Historia Sacra form composed by Giacomo Carissimi around 1650 (probably 1648), based on the story of Jephtha in the Old Testament Book of Judges. The work follows what is considered the classic early Baroque oratorio form with a Biblical text related by soloists and a chorus linked by a narrator. The only known contemporaneous score is for organ continuo alone though this is sometimes augmented in performance by violins and string bass, for which some support exists in other works by the composer.

A 1976 version exists arranged by Hans Werner Henze for 7 solo voices, 6 part chorus, flutes, percussion and plucked strings.

== See also ==
- Jephtha (Handel)
