= Olle Elgenmark =

Swedish organist and composer

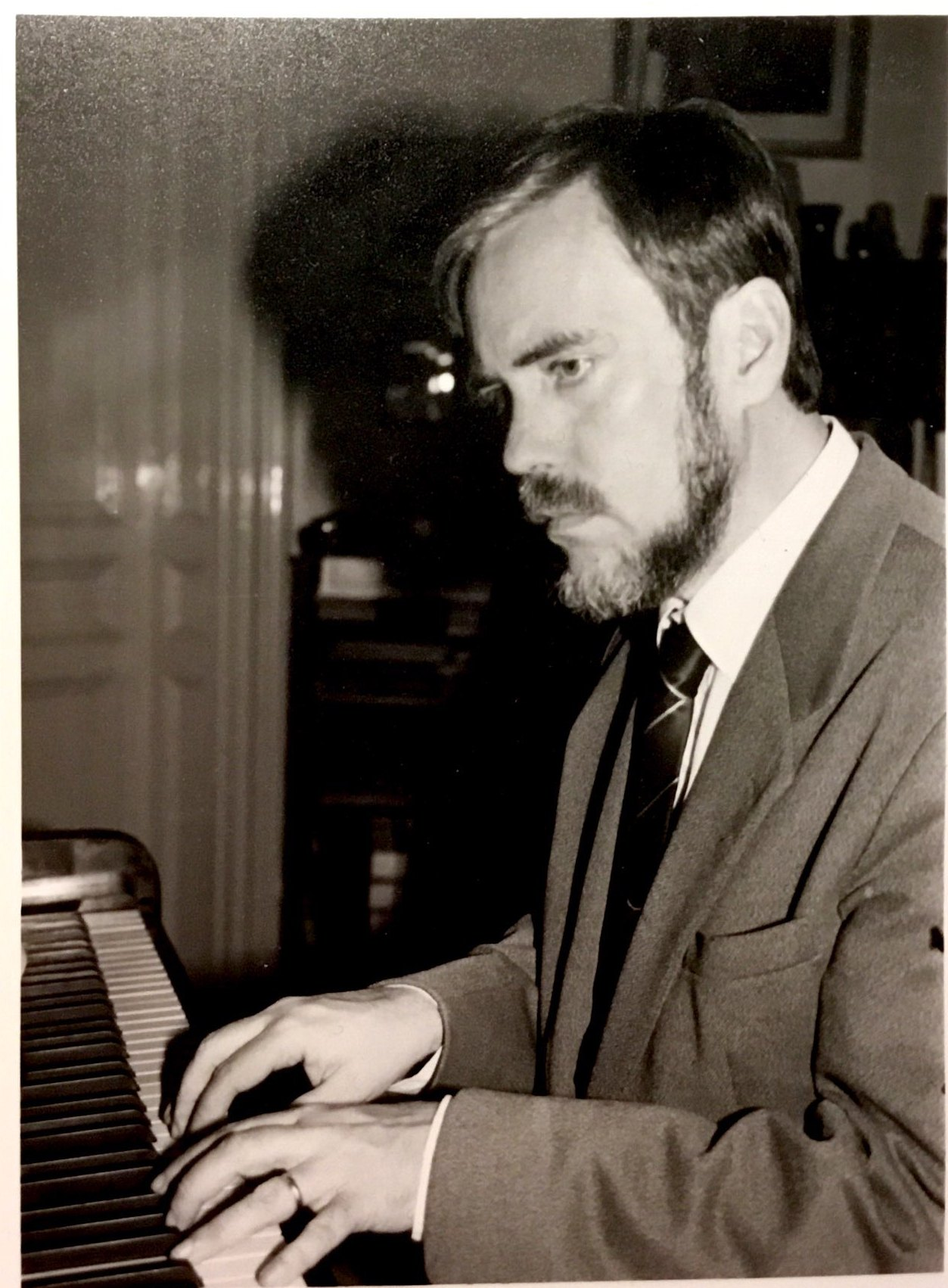
- Born: Olle Elgenmark; 22 February 1936; Stockholm, Sweden
- Died: 24 December 2016 (aged 80); Norrköping, Sweden
- Occupations: Organist, composer

Olle Elgenmark (22 February 1936 – 24 December 2016) was a Swedish organist and composer.

== Early years ==
Elgenmark was born on Södermalm in Stockholm, the son of the paediatrician, Olof Alfred Elgenmark, M. D. (1908–1972) and Elsa Judith Elgenmark, MA, (née Hellsing) (1908–1937).

As his mother died when Elgenmark was only one year old, his father left him to be raised by his maternal grandparents, Hanna Hellsing, (née Hempel, 1873–1957) and the mechanical engineer at Bolinders, Karl Gustaf Fridolf Hellsing (1873–1946). Olle Elgenmark's parents were both very musically talented, and in the grandparents' home, music was always present. In 1958 Elgenmark married Agneta Ström (b. 1937) with whom he subsequently had three children.

When Elgenmark was a young boy he was given piano lessons, but it wasn't until the age of 15 that he became interested in the church organ and wanted to take organ lessons. As a student at Östra Real upper secondary school he got the opportunity to play the grand school organ for 15 minutes a week. In an interview Elgenmark told the following story: When he was 17 years old, he had private lessons in organ for the music director and organist Henry Lindroth. The latter asked after the first lesson: "Well, what are your plans for the future?" "I'm going to be an engineer", the boy said. "No, you're not! You are going to be an organist, nothing else!" the musical director said with emphasis. Elgenmark graduated from Royal Swedish Academy of Music (current Royal College of Music in Stockholm), where he studied Organ for Alf Linder and Harmony for Henry Lindroth from 1955 with the education equivalent of Master of Fine Arts in Church Music 1959, 1965 and 1966.

== Organist in Stockholm ==
Elgenmark was 1959–1964 musician in Solna Church and 1965–1968 organist in the parish of Engelbrekt (Hjorthagen) where he conducted his own compositions for organ, choir, solo voices and orchestra. He also served in other churches and held organ recitals. In one of his early recitals before the age of 20, Elgenmark played works of Frescobaldi, Scheidt, Buxtehude and Bach. Elgenmark often visited the various churches in Stockholm to study the great organists of the 1950s, such as Oskar Lindberg, Otto Olsson and Waldemar Åhlén. As a young student he got access to the organ loft to see when professor Otto Olsson played the organ in Gustav Vasa Church. Otto Olsson made a great impression on the young Elgenmark. In 1963 Elgenmark was a substitute for the successor to Otto Olsson and noticed the powerful handwriting of the professor. Elgenmark himself had a recognised beautiful fountain pen calligraphy in his handwritten music.

== Compositions and inspiration ==
Elgenmarks compositions consist of hundreds of major and minor works: chorale bound works for organ, solo and choir songs, cantatas, arrangements and more. During his time as an organist in Stockholm and Norrköping, he also served for almost 20 years as a choirmaster. At that time, he wrote choir music adapted to his choirs in many musical settings. And "with his six extremely well-written and extensive organ symphonies Elgenmark appears as our [Sweden's] most prominent composer of organ symphonies" according to Ralph Gustafsson, professor in organ at Royal College of Music in Stockholm. "As a composer Elgenmark stands out from his Swedish peer's. His music's tonality is a development of Otto Olsson's romantic organ tonal idiom and thus diverges from the tonal language his colleagues use", the colleague Henric de Koster wrote in an article in Norrköping's Newspapers 1996.

=== Organ symphonies ===
The first of Elgenmark's organ symphonies, A Carillon Symphony in E♭ major, was written on commission from the organist in Stockholm City Hall, Åke Levén (a.k.a. Ralph Davier) (1930 –2015), for a planned inauguration in August 1973 of the restored organ in the Blue Hall in Stockholm City Hall. The symphony was written 1972 –1973 and the premiere of the symphony was planned to take place on that inauguration. But the organ suffered from major water damage and the concert was cancelled. Instead, Åke Levén premiered the Adagio from the symphony at a concert in Royal Albert Hall in London in September 1973. The symphony is 45 minutes long. The Adagio from A Carillon Symphony has been played on Sweden's Radio P2.

In an interview, Elgenmark talked about the process of composing. "It often starts with an idea, or a notion. Then you see what you can do about it," he says and talks about "seeing a subjects inherent possibilities". Bach is a musical model. The subject of the Second organ symphony, Sinfonia Breve (1975) in D minor, came to Elgenmark when he was waiting at a railway station in London 1973. There had been a bomb attack there, and the passengers were delayed because they were body searched. The symphony was reviewed as "a piece of good quality" during the Swedish organ festival 1995 in Stockholm. "Elgenmark's music is high-romantic and orchestral and, sure, the composer sometimes flirts with impressionist sounds that even has an air of jazz." "Overall, one can experience a certain mysterious timeless melancholy in this music" the music director and critic Michael Bruze wrote after Nils Larsson, organist at the Högalid Church in Stockholm, performed the Second organ symphony in 2014. The symphony is 18 minutes long and has been played on Swedish radio. Organ symphony No. 2 is represented at Svensk Musik, Swedish Music.

The introduction motif for the Third organ symphony, Symphonie élégiaque in E minor, came to Elgenmark's mind in 1972, but it took until 1990 before the work was completed. Here, the second movement Sarabande stands out "with light and dark color tones", "music with intimacy and warmth without a trace of sentimentality". The symphony is about 35 minutes long and has been played on the radio. Organ symphony No. 3 is represented at Svensk Musik, Swedish Music.

The Fourth organ symphony, A Festival Symphony in A major, was written for the inauguration of St. Matthew's Church organ after the renovation 1990–1992 by organ builder Kenneth James & Son after the design of Elgenmark himself. Elgenmark applied for the position as organist in St. Matthew's Church, Norrköping in 1968, because it had a "top notch instrument" that a student friend had recommended, but it was in need of renovation. So, when the new organ was inaugurated in 1992 at the same time as the 100th anniversary of St. Matthew's Church, it would be showcased in all its splendor with a newly written symphony. Professor Hans Fagius played a shortened Festival Toccata from the Fourth symphony during the music festival The Sound of Norrköping (Norrköpingsljud) 2015 and described the music as follows: "The movement begins as a typical French organ toccata with figurations in the hands over a pedal theme that is subject to an extensive variation. In contrast, in the middle comes a more quiet section with clear features of Swedish national romantic music. The main theme emerges in different polyphonic ways, then the initial toccata returns, now followed by a short canon between the pedal and the manual before the piece ends with a lavish tutti" The symphony is 45 minutes long and has also been played on radio. Organ symphony No. 4 is represented at Svensk Musik, Swedish Music.

The Fifth organ symphony is called Retrospecition (in G minor) and the name alludes on a compilation of English organ music from the 50s, especially the first piece in that collection written by Harold E. Darke. The three movements are an ouverture in sonata-form, a passagcaglia and one grand fugue, and it all emanates from the classic fugue subject. The Fifth symphony is monothematic, like the Sixth symphony, called Enigma (in C major).

Elgenmark wrote six organ symphonies and he began the Seventh organ symphony the last few years of his life and wrote one complete movement with a quadruple fugue in B♭ minor (one fugue on four subjects). The movement, probably intended as the Final, was premiered after Elgenmark's death by the organist Mark Falsjö in St. John's Church in Norrköping on 26 February 2017.

=== Christmas oratorio ===
One of the compositions that stands out in Elgenmark's oeuvre is his magnum opus the Christmas Oratorio Ordet vart kött (The Word was made Flesh ) that he wrote between 1974 and 1982. The oratorio is written for choir, solo voices, recitative, congregational (assembly) song and symphony orchestra. The finale is a quadruple fugue. Many triple fugues are known, but it's rare with quadruple fugues in the music literature. The premiere was in St. Matthew's Church in Norrköping on 10 January 1982 and the conductor was the music director Hans Zimmergren.

In a radio interview Elgenmark mentioned the following sources of inspiration for his oratorio: "As far as I know myself, I have been inspired a lot by English choral music, the Anglican tradition and a certain impressionist coloured church music particularly in the English field. I can mention a composer like Herbert Howells /.../ who has meant a lot to me."

A highlight from the oratorio is the choir song O, sunrise, (O soluppgång) based on medieval antiphones. Elgenmark's Christmas Oratorio was last performed 2013 in St. Olai Church in Norrköping, conducted by the organist and music director David Löfgren.

== Music style ==
What distinguishes Elgenmark's style is "an exquisite use of counter point, colorful harmony, a clear musical idiom and confident instrumentation". Always sticking to his romantic music ideals, regardless of the prevailing isms within organ music of the day made him an outsider as he was playing composers of romantic music, such as Guilmant and Widor, who were seen as decadent and impossible to play in Sweden in the 1960s due to the Organ Movement. Today he appears to have been a pioneer in the field of new romantic music and has many followers.

On the question of what characterizes his style, Elgenmark answered in an interview at his retirement that "it is probably the harmony, that there is an extended chord thinking, something beyond the triad, an extension" and that he has been influenced by his "house gods" César Franck, Oskar Lindberg and Sigfrid Karg–Elert and a mix of Church mode, late romantic music and cautious impressionism".

== Repertoire and improvisation ==
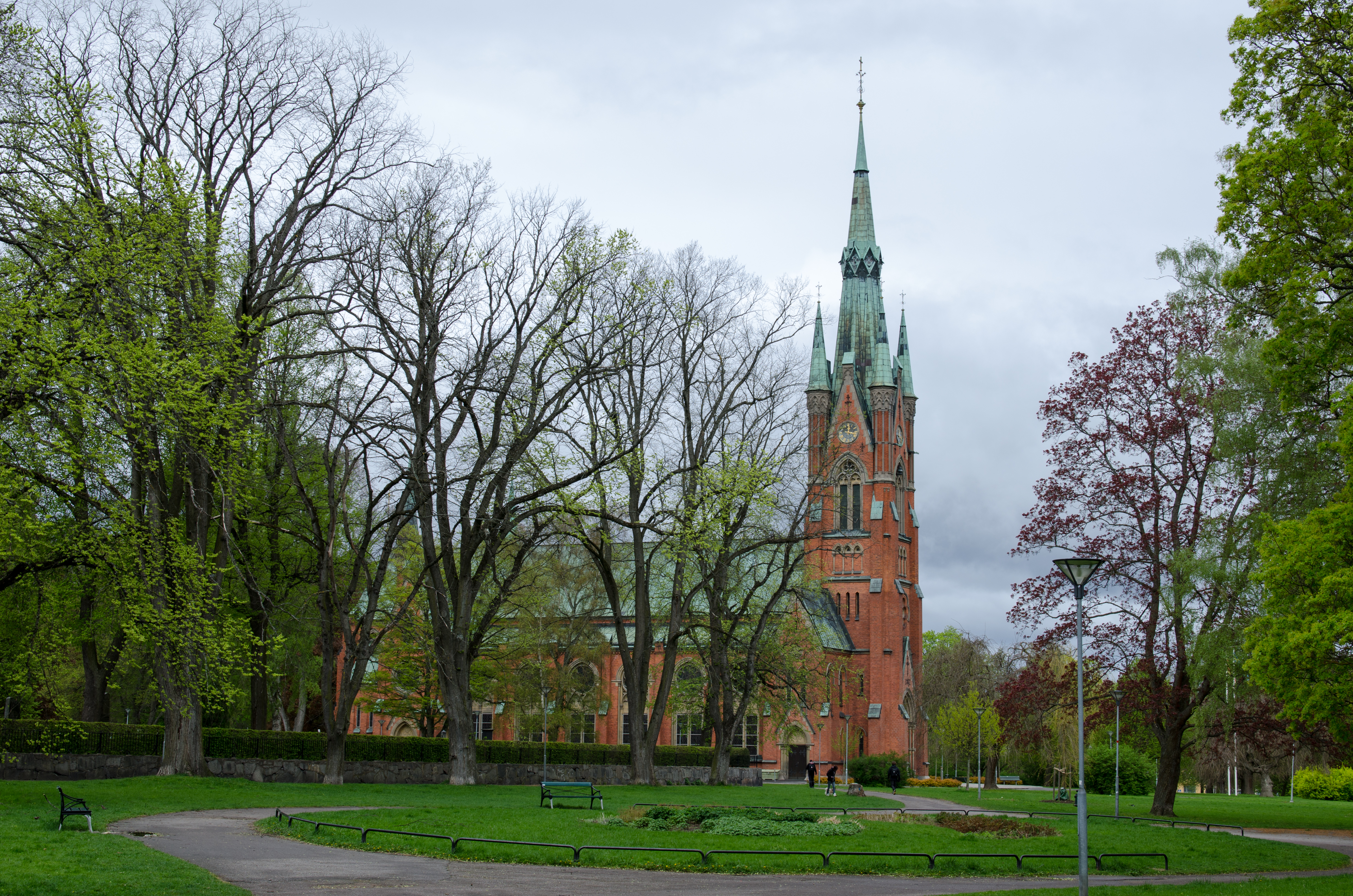
St. Matthew's Church 2012

Elgenmark played his own and other composers' organ works on Sweden's Radio P2 in the 80's and 90's. On the cathedral organ in St. Matthew's Church (Matteus kyrka) in Norrköping, where Elgenmark served from 1968 until his retirement, he held organ recitals every week for 27 years where he performed a broad organ repertoire. He played the great Bach works, sonatas of Rheinberger, symphonies of Widor, Otto Olsson's giant Credo symphony, music of Swedish romantics and his own works. Elgenmark's improvisation art was particularly great, especially his chorale preludes were greatly appreciated. In the end of his life he composed and completed organ music over 72 chorales. Elgenmark had reached Opus number 47 by his 80th birthday. He died in Norrköping, where he is buried at St. Matthew's Cemetery.

== Compositions by genre ==
=== Organ symphonies ===
- Organ Symphony No. 1, E♭ major, A Carillon Symphony (1971–1972) Dedicated to Ralph Davier, Op. 19
- Organ Symphony No. 2, D minor, Sinfonia breve (1973–1975) Dedicated to Ralph Gustafsson, Op. 26
- Organ Symphony No. 3, E minor, Symphonie Élégiaque (1973–1990) Op. 35
- Organ Symphony No. 4, A major, A Festival Symphony, composed to the inauguration of the renovated organ in St. Matthew's church, Norrköping 1992 (1990–1992) Dedicated to Kenneth James in memoriam, Op. 38
- Organ Symphony No. 5, G minor, Retrospection (1977–2002) Op. 40
- Organ Symphony No. 6, C major, Enigma (1995–2001) Dedicated to Märtha Hellsing–Olsson, Op. 41
- Organ Symphony No. 7, in B♭ minor, (unfinished) with one complete movement: a quadruple fugue

=== Other works for organ solo ===
- Choral variations for organ on Gud ej sitt tryckta barn förgäter (1953–1954) Op. 1
- Choral variations (in neoclassicistic spirit) for organ on Befall i Herrens händer (1956–1958) Op. 3
- Two wedding pieces for organ: Andante solenne (1958) Bröllopsmusik (1960) Op. 4 No. 1
- Three organ chorals: Vad ljus över griften, När världens hopp förtvinat stod, Härlig är jorden (1957, 1961) Op. 4 No. 2
- Choral Variations for organ on I denna ljuva sommartid (1961) Op. 5 No. 1
- Choral Variations for organ on Sorgen och glädjen, de vandra tillsammans (1961) Op. 5 No. 2
- Choral Variations for organ on En herrdag i höjden (1961) Op. 6 No. 1
- Choral Variations for organ on Den blomstertid nu kommer (1953, 1964) Op. 6 No. 2
- Fantasy and double fugue on the Swedish hymn with two melodies I himmelen, i himmelen (1962–1963) Op. 7
- Choral fantasy, introduction and double fugue for organ on Lova vill jag Herran, Herran (1963) Op. 8
- Festal Voluntary in E major (Festal prelude) (1970) Op. 17
- Fugue in D minor over a theme from Rossini's Cat Duet
- Four Voluntaries for organ: (1986–1990) Dedicated to Dag Nilsson, Gavotte in the style of E.H. Thiman Op. 33 No. 1; Pastorale Op. 33 No. 2; Adagio Op. 33 No. 3; Allegro Energico Op. 33 No. 4
- Trois Marches: Marche de fête (1987) Marche religieuse, Marche pontificale (unfinished) Op. 34
- The Knobs and Pipes forever, Festival March for Organ, Suite Humoresque (1990-1992) Op. 36
- Six Preludes, Intrada (Festival Polonaise) Andante in F, Gavotte No. 2, Pastorale, Scherzetto, Finale (unfinished) Op. 37
- A Christmas Rhapsody, Julrapsodi, for organ on well known hymns and songs (1994) Op. 39
- Nostalgic fantasy for organ: Gustaf Adolfsdagen, Erik Erling in memoriam (1996, 1999) Op. 42
- Nostalgic fantasy for organ: Om sommaren sköna (with carillon) Variations on a song from Dalarna (2000) Op. 43
- 72 Choral Improvisations: Choral fantasies and choral variations in the spirit of Karg–Elert, in different styles, forms and techniques: classical organ chorales, toccatas, passacaglias, symphonic pieces and concert fantasies (2000–2011) Op. 45–47
- Luther, six meditations for organ in Otto Malling's spirit and following, a counterpart to his suite Paulus, an organ mass with Kyrie, Gloria, Credo, Sanctus, Agnus Dei, with chorales written by Luther and with chorales from his time
- Organ suite: Six Sketches from the Lake of One, Suite Humoresque, homage to Karg–Elert: Morning Meditation, The Soul of the Cottage, Midsummer Melancholy, Cat's Fugue, St. Lambert's Hymn to the Moon, The rising water (unfinished)

=== Works for voice and organ ===
- Two hymns for solo voice and organ: David's 121st Psalm: Jag lyfter mina ögon, David's 23rd Psalm: Herren är min herde (The lord is my shepherd (1966) Dedicated to Agneta Elgenmark, Op. 11
- David's 42nd Psalm for soprano and cathedral organ (1975) Op. 24
- David's 84th Psalm: Huru ljuvliga äro icke dina boningar Herre Sebaoth, symphonic meditation for soprano and cathedral organ (1975) Op. 25
- Songs about the Eternity for solo voice and organ: Din boning, Herre, är ett ljuvligt hem, Högt i himlens sälla boning (both texts from the Finland Swedish Hymn Book) Jag kommer av ett brusand' hav, Bortom tidens dunkla vågor, I himmelen sjunger kring Lammets tron (1977) Op. 29
- Songs for one voice and organ: Ett har jag begärt av Herren and Hur dyrbar är icke din nåd (2000) Op. 44

=== Works for voice, choral and organ ===
- Cantata for soli, choir and organ, New Years Day 1957 (1956) Op. 2 No. 1
- Choral cantata for soli, choir, symphonic cathedral organ: Min själ, du måste nu glömma (1972) Op. 18
- Two hymns: Lovad vare Herren (Psalt. 68) and Veni Sancte Spiritus for soprano solo, mixed choir and organ (1973) op. 23
- Two Anthems for solo voices, choir and organ: Jag vill lova Gud med sång and Sanningen, i den vi fria göras, Text from the Finland Swedish Hymn Book (1975) op. 27
- Gläd er i Herren alltid (Olle's Bell Anthem) for solo, choir and organ (1981) Op. 31

=== Choral and organ ===
- Anthem for mixed choir and organ: Veni Sancte Spiritus (1963) Op. 9 No. 1
- Three choral works for mixed choir and organ: Oändlige, o du vars hand (soprano solo), Lovsjungen Herren (soprano), Ett barn är fött på denna dag (choir) (1965) Op. 9 No. 2
- Five choral works for female voices (children's choir) and organ: Denna är den stora dagen (original melody 1965); Så skön en väg ej finns på jord; Omkring ditt Ord, o Jesu; I stilla Fastetider; Du bar ditt kors (1969) Op. 16
- Four songs for children's choir and organ: Nu strålar söndagssol från sky, Till templet Jesusbarnet kom, Herren är min herde god and Lovsjungen, alla länder, Gud (1969–71) Op. 21 No. 1

=== Choral ===
- Two songs for mixed choir En dunkel örtagård jag vet, I denna signade juletid, Text: C.G. Hellsing (1956) Op. 2 No. 2
- Five songs a cappella (1966) Op. 12
- Five hymns for mixed choir a capella: Dig kläd i helighetens skrud; Upp Sion, att prisa och lova din Gud; Om icke vetekornet dör; När ingen dager ögat skådar; Så Gud all världen älskat har (1969–1972) Op. 22
- Choir suite over a choral from Dalarna: Himmelriket liknas vid tio jungfrur (1972) Op. 21 No. 2
- Latin hymns for choir a capella: Tantum ergo Sacramentum; O Esca viatorum (1976, later rev. ) Op. 32

=== Works for voice, choral, organ and orchestra ===
- Cantata for Advent for baritone, choir, orchestra, harp and organ (1965, 1967,1970) Op. 10
- Hymnus ad Sanctam Trinitatem, composition for choir, organ, orchestra and harp (1967) Op. 13
- Aria for basso with orchestra Ur djupen ropar jag (text: Psalt 130) Aria for soprano and orchestra: Marias begrundan, Triple fugue for choir with soli and orchestra: Stå upp, var ljus, Extra material from the Christmas Oratorio (1973–1981) Op. 30 No. 2
- Missa Brevis for choir and orchestra: Kyrie – Gloria – Sanctus – Agnus Dei, Extra material from the Christmas Oratorio (1973–1981) Op. 30 No. 3

=== Works for voice, choral, violin or trumpet ===
- Two choral cantatas for soli, choir, organ and viola: Den kärlek du till världen bar, Gud är här tillstädes (1966–1967) Op. 14
- Easter hymn, for mixed choir, trumpet and organ (1967) Op. 15
- Gradual hymns for the Church Year: choir, congregational song, organ and other instruments (1969–1972) Op. 20

=== Oratorio ===
- A Christmas Oratorio Ordet vart kött (The Word was made Flesh) for choir, solo voices, recitative, congregational song and symphony orchestra (1973–1981, rev. 2003) Op. 30 No. 1

== Compositions by opus number ==
- Choral variations for organ on Gud ej sitt tryckta barn förgäter (1953–1954) Op. 1
- Cantata for soli, choir and organ, New Years Day 1957 (1956) Op. 2 No. 1
- Two songs for mixed choir En dunkel örtagård jag vet, I denna signade juletid, Text: C.G. Hellsing (1956) Op. 2 No. 2
- Choral variations (in neoclassicistic spirit) for organ on Befall i Herrens händer (1956–1958) Op. 3
- Two wedding pieces for organ: Andante solenne (1958) Bröllopsmusik (1960) Op. 4 No. 1
- Three organ chorals: Vad ljus över griften, När världens hopp förtvinat stod, Härlig är jorden (1957, 1961) Op. 4 No. 2
- Choral Variations for organ on I denna ljuva sommartid (1961) Op. 5 No. 1
- Choral Variations for organ on Sorgen och glädjen, de vandra tillsammans (1961) Op. 5 No. 2
- Choral Variations for organ on En herrdag i höjden (1961) Op. 6 No. 1
- Choral Variations for organ on Den blomstertid nu kommer (1953, 1964) Op. 6 No. 2
- Fantasy and double fugue on the Swedish hymn with two melodies I himmelen, i himmelen (1962–1963) Op. 7
- Choral fantasy, introduction and double fugue for organ on Lova vill jag Herran, Herran (1963) Op. 8
- Anthem for mixed choir and organ Veni Sancte Spiritus (1963) Op. 9 No. 1
- Three choral works for mixed choir and organ: Oändlige, o du vars hand (soprano solo), Lovsjungen Herren (soprano), Ett barn är fött på denna dag (choir) (1965) Op. 9 No. 2
- Cantata for Advent for baritono, choir, orchestra, harp and organ (1965, 1967,1970) Op. 10
- Two hymns for solo voice and organ: David's 121st psalm: Jag lyfter mina ögon, David's 23rd psalm: Herren är min herde (The lord is my shepherd (1966) Dedicated to Agneta Elgenmark, Op. 11
- Five songs a cappella (1966) Op. 12
- Hymnus ad Sanctam Trinitatem, composition for choir, organ, orchestra and harp (1967) Op. 13
- Two choral cantatas for soli, choir, organ and viola: Den kärlek du till världen bar, Gud är här tillstädes (1966–1967) Op. 14
- Easter hymn, for mixed choir, trumpet and organ (1967) Op. 15
- Five choral works for female voices (children's choir) and organ: Denna är den stora dagen (original melody 1965); Så skön en väg ej finns på jord; Omkring ditt Ord, o Jesu; I stilla Fastetider; Du bar ditt kors (1969) Op. 16
- Festal Voluntary in E major (Festal prelude) (1970) Op. 17
- Choral cantata for soli, choir, symphonic cathedral organ: Min själ, du måste nu glömma (1972) Op. 18
- Organ Symphony No. 1, E♭ major, A Carillon Symphony (1971–1972) Dedicated to Ralph Davier, Op. 19
- Fugue in D minor over a theme from Rossini's Cat Duet
- Gradual hymns for the Church Year: choir, congregational song, organ and other instruments (1969–1972) Op. 20
- Four songs for children's choir and organ: Nu strålar söndagssol från sky, Till templet Jesusbarnet kom, Herren är min herde god and Lovsjungen, alla länder, Gud (1969–71) Op. 21 No. 1
- Choir suite over a choral from Dalarna: Himmelriket liknas vid tio jungfrur (1972) Op. 21 No. 2
- Five hymns for mixed choir a capella: Dig kläd i helighetens skrud; Upp Sion, att prisa och lova din Gud; Om icke vetekornet dör; När ingen dager ögat skådar; Så Gud all världen älskat har (1969–1972) Op. 22
- Two hymns: Lovad vare Herren (Psalt. 68) and Veni Sancte Spiritus for soprano solo, mixed choir and organ (1973) op. 23
- David's 42nd Psalm for soprano and cathedral organ (1975) Op. 24
- David's 84th Psalm: Huru ljuvliga äro icke dina boningar Herre Sebaoth, symphonic meditation for soprano and cathedral organ (1975) Op. 25
- Organ Symphony No. 2, D minor, Sinfonia breve (1973–1975) Dedicated to Ralph Gustafsson, Op. 26
- Two Anthems for solo voices, choir and organ: Jag vill lova Gud med sång and Sanningen, i den vi fria göras, Text from the Finland Swedish Hymn Book (1975) op. 27
- Songs about the Eternity for solo voice and organ: Din boning, Herre, är ett ljuvligt hem, Högt i himlens sälla boning (both texts from the Finland Swedish Hymn Book) Jag kommer av ett brusand' hav, Bortom tidens dunkla vågor, I himmelen sjunger kring Lammets tron (1977) Op. 29
- A Christmas Oratorio Ordet vart kött (The Word was made Flesh) for choir, solo voices, recitative, congregational song and symphony orchestra (1973–1981, rev. 2003) Op. 30 No. 1
- Aria for basso with orchestra Ur djupen ropar jag (text: Psalt 130) Aria for soprano and orchestra: Marias begrundan, Triple fugue for choir with soli and orchestra: Stå upp, var ljus, Extra material from the Christmas Oratorio (1973–1981) Op. 30 No. 2
- Missa Brevis for choir and orchestra: Kyrie – Gloria – Sanctus – Agnus Dei, Extra material from the Christmas Oratorio (1973–1981) Op. 30 No. 3
- Gläd er i Herren alltid (Olle's Bell Anthem) for solo, choir and organ (1981) Op. 31
- Latin hymns for choir a capella: Tantum ergo Sacramentum; O Esca viatorum (1976, later rev. ) Op. 32
- Four Voluntaries for organ: (1986–1990) Dedicated to Dag Nilsson, Gavotte in the style of E.H. Thiman Op. 33 No. 1
- Pastorale Op. 33 No. 2
- Adagio Op. 33 No. 3
- Allegro Energico Op. 33 No. 4
- Trois Marches: Marche de fête (1987) Marche religieuse, Marche pontificale (unfinished) Op. 34
- Organ Symphony No. 3, E minor, Symphonie Élégiaque (1973–1990) Op. 35
- The Knobs and Pipes forever, Festival March for Organ, Suite Humoresque (1990-1992) Op. 36
- Six Preludes, Intrada (Festival polonaise) Andante in F, Gavotte No. 2, Pastorale, Scherzetto, Finale (unfinished) Op. 37
- Organ Symphony No. 4, A major, A Festival Symphony, composed to the inauguration of the renovated organ in St. Matthews church, Norrköping 1992 (1990–1992) Dedicated to Kenneth James in memoriam, Op. 38
- A Christmas Rhapsody, Julrapsodi, for organ over well known hymns and songs (1994) Op. 39
- Organ Symphony No. 5, G minor, Retrospection (1977–2002) Op. 40
- Organ Symphony No. 6, C major, Enigma (1995–2001) Dedicated to Märtha Hellsing–Olsson, Op. 41
- Nostalgic fantasy for organ: Gustaf Adolfsdagen, Erik Erling in memoriam (1996, 1999) Op. 42
- Nostalgic fantasy for organ: Om sommaren sköna (with carillon) Variations on a song from Dalarna (2000) Op. 43
- Songs for one voice and organ: Ett har jag begärt av Herren and Hur dyrbar är icke din nåd (2000) Op. 44
- 72 Choral Improvisations: Choral fantasies and choral variations in the spirit of Karg–Elert, in different styles, forms and techniques: classical organ chorales, toccatas, passacaglias, symphonic pieces and concert fantasies (2000–2011) Op. 45–47
- Luther, six meditations for organ in Otto Malling's spirit and following, a counterpart to his suite Paulus, an organ mass with Kyrie, Gloria, Credo, Sanctus, Agnus Dei, with chorales written by Luther and with chorales from his time
- Organ suite: Six Sketches from the Lake of One, Suite Humoresque, homage to Karg–Elert: Morning Meditation, The Soul of the Cottage, Midsummer Melancholy, Cat's Fugue, St. Lambert's Hymn to the Moon, The rising water (unfinished)
- Fuga Quadruplicis in B♭ minor, a quadruple fugue, intended as one movement of Elgenmark's unfinished 7th Organ Symphony

== Discography ==
- Henrik Cervin: Organ in Gustavi Dome in Gothenburg, Opus 3 Records – 8307 (1983) | Elgenmark's I denna ljuva sommartid included
- Three organists in Norrköping | Olle Elgenmark, Bengt-Göran Sköld and Hans Zimmergren. Kyrkonämnden, Norrköping (2000)
- Ralph Gustafsson - Orgeln i Sofia kyrka, Stockholm (Ictus Music Production 2017 –2018 IMP1821) | Elgenmark's Organ Symphony No. 2, Sinfonia Breve included
