= I penitenti al sepolcro del redentore, ZWV 63 =

1736 musical work by Jan Dismas Zelenka

I penitenti al sepolcro del redentore (The penitents at the tomb of the redeemer), ZWV 63, is an oratorio by Jan Dismas Zelenka, commissioned and first composed for a performance on Good Friday, March 30 1736, for his employer Augustus III, in Dresden. The work departing from the usual canon of a setting of the text of one of the Gospels, being instead a poem focusing on the meaning of Christ's sacrifice, is unusual in this aspect.

The work was well received, a contemporary diary from the Dresden Jesuits reporting that on the date in question, "at 8 pm a very elegant new oratorio composed by Zelenka titled I Penitenti al Sepolchro was heard, and for this, candles were placed in the choir." It is also possible that the oratorio was repeated three years later, when the Jesuits again write that Zelenka was the composer of oratorios heard on Good Friday and on Holy Saturday, although there is more certainty that it was again played in Prague in 1738, a performance made possible through the intervention of Zelenka's patron, Jan Hubert Hartig.

The work survives as a manuscript in the Saxon State Library in Dresden, and has been recorded by various modern artists.

== Text ==
The text, written by Stefano Benedetto Pallavicini, combines the Old and New Testaments, by depicting an imaginary meeting between King David, Mary Magdalene and Peter at Christ's tomb.

== Music ==
The work begins with a sinfonia which bears semblance to a French overture, the long, intensely dramatic and chromatic central fugato being surrounded by slow sections featuring 3-against-4 rhythmic conflicts. In addition to a few recitatives, it features a short, fiery aria for Peter (Lingua perfida), and four long da capo arias (averaging more than 10 minutes each), two each for David and Mary Magdalene. A chorus closes the whole.

The music features a lot of pizzicato and strumming effects. The work bears the usual fingerprints of the composer, which make him "one of the few of his era with a true personal style": from a rhythmic point of view, the work is most remarkable for its polyrhythmic opposition of duple and triple meters, which is combined with nearly constant syncopation and asymmetrical phrases. Melodically and harmonically, odd-looking fugue subjects are coupled with coloured harmonies and long, abruptly-ending ritornellos. The orchestral writing, along with expressive solos, bears a theatricality close to that of a secular opera.

1. Adagio – Andante – Adagio [Sinfonia]
2. Aria (King David) – Squarcia le chiome
3. Recitativo secco (King David) – Tramontata è la Stella
4. Recitativo accompagnato (Mary Magdalene) – Oimè, quasi nel campo
5. Aria (Mary Magdalene) – Del mio amor, divini sguardi
6. Recitativo secco (Peter) – Quai la dispersa greggia
7. Aria (Peter) – Lingua perfida
8. Recitativo secco (Mary Magdalene) – Per la traccia del sangue
9. Aria (Mary Magdalene) – Da vivo tronco aperto
10. Recitativo accompagnato (King David) – Questa che fu possente
11. Aria (King David) – Le tue corde, arpe sonora
12. Recitativo secco (Peter) – Tributo accetto più, più grato dono/ Recitativo secco Maddalena
13. Coro e Aria (King David) – Miserere mio Dio
