= Giacomo Carissimi =

Italian composer (1605–1674)

(Gian) Giacomo Carissimi (Italian pronunciation: [ˈʒaːkomo kaˈrissimi]; baptized 18 April 1605 – 12 January 1674) was an Italian composer and music teacher. He is one of the most celebrated masters of the early Baroque or, more accurately, the Roman School of music. Carissimi established the characteristic features of the Latin oratorio and was a prolific composer of masses, motets, and cantatas. He was highly influential in musical developments in northern European countries through his pupils, like Kerll in Germany and Charpentier in France, and the wide dissemination of his music.

== Biography ==
Carissimi's exact birthdate is not known, but it was probably in 1604 or 1605 in Marino near Rome, Italy. Of his early, life almost nothing is known. Giacomo's parents, Amico (1548–1633, a cooper by trade) and Livia (1565–1622), were married on 14 May 1595 and had four daughters and two sons; Giacomo was the youngest.

Nothing is known of his early musical training. His first known appointments were at Tivoli Cathedral, under the maestri di cappella Aurelio Briganti Colonna, Alessandro Capece and Francesco Manelli; from October 1623, he sang in the choir, and from October 1624 to October 1627 he was the organist. In 1628, Carissimi moved north to Assisi, as maestro di cappella (chapel master) at the Cathedral of San Rufino. In 1628, he obtained the same position at the church of Sant'Apollinare belonging to the Collegium Germanicum in Rome, which he held until his death. This was despite his receiving several offers to work in very prominent establishments, including an offer to take over from Claudio Monteverdi at San Marco di Venezia in Venice. In 1637, he was ordained a priest.

In 1656 Christina of Sweden, who was then living in Rome, appointed Carissimi as her maestro di cappella del concerto di camera. Lars Englund of Uppsala University has hypothesized that Christina’s early involvement with Carissimi's music, and other church music from Rome, "was part of a deliberate self-transformation, from a ruling Lutheran regent to a Catholic Queen without a land."

Carissimi seems to have never left Italy at all during his entire lifetime. He died in 1674 in Rome.

Carissimi's successor as maestro di cappella at the Collegium Germanicum in 1686 described him as tall, thin, very frugal in his domestic affairs, with very noble manners towards his friends and acquaintances, and prone to melancholy.

== Music ==
The great achievements generally ascribed to Carissimi are the further development of the recitative, introduced by Monteverdi, which is highly important to the history of dramatic music; the further development of the chamber cantata, by which Carissimi superseded the concertato madrigals which had themselves replaced the madrigals of the late Renaissance; and the development of the oratorio, of which he was the first significant composer.

Carissimi's position in the history of church, vocal and chamber music is somewhat similar to that of Francesco Cavalli in the history of opera. While Luigi Rossi was his predecessor in developing the chamber cantata, Carissimi was the composer who first made this form the vehicle for the most intellectual style of chamber music, a function which it continued to perform until the death of Alessandro Scarlatti, Emanuele d'Astorga and Benedetto Marcello.

Carissimi is also noted as one of the first composers of oratorios, with Jephte as probably his best-known work, along with Jonas. These works and others are important for establishing the form of oratorio unaccompanied by dramatic action, which maintained its hold for 200 years. The name comes from their presentation at the Oratory of Santissimo Crocifisso in Rome. He may also be credited for having given greater variety and interest to the instrumental accompaniments of vocal compositions. Charles Burney and John Hawkins both published specimens of his compositions in their works on the history of music, while Henry Aldrich collected an almost complete set of his compositions, which are currently housed at the library of Christ Church, Oxford. The British Museum also possesses numerous works by Carissimi. Most of his oratorios are in the Bibliothèque Nationale in Paris.

Carissimi was active at the time when secular music was about to usurp the dominance of sacred music in Italy. The change was decisive and permanent. When Carissimi began composing, the influence of the previous generations of Roman composers was still heavy (for instance, the style of Palestrina) and when his career came to a close the operatic forms, as well as the instrumental secular forms, were predominant. In addition, Carissimi was important as a teacher, and his influence spread far into Germany and France. Much of the musical style of Johann Caspar Kerll and Marc-Antoine Charpentier, for instance, was influenced by Carissimi.

== Selected works ==
=== Oratorios ===
- Baltazar, oratorio for 5 voices, 2 violons & continuo
- Dives Malus (The wicked rich man) also known as Historia Divitis for 2 sopranos, tenor, bass (c. 1640), about the Rich man and Lazarus.
- Ezechia, oratorio for 5 voices, 2 violons & continuo
- Jephte, oratorio for 6 voices & continuo 1648
- Jonas, oratorio for soloists, SATB double chorus, 2 violins & continuo
- Judicium Extremum, oratorio for soloists, chorus & continuo
- Judicium Salomonis, oratorio for 4 voices, 2 violins & continuo
- Vanitas Vanitatum, oratorio for 5 voices, 2 violins & continuo
- Oratorio Della Santissima Vergine

=== Cantatas ===
- Piangete, aure, piangete, cantata for soprano & continuo
- Così volete, così sarà, cantata for soprano & continuo 1640
- Vittoria, mio core (Amante sciolto d'amore), cantata for soprano & continuo 1646
- Ferma Lascia Ch'Io Parli (Lamento della Regina Maria Stuarda), cantata for soprano & continuo 1650
- Sciolto havean dall'alte sponde (I naviganti), cantata for 2 sopranos, baritone & continuo 1653
- Apritevi inferni (Peccator penitente), cantata for soprano & continuo 1663

=== Motets ===
- Lamentationes Jeremiae Prophetae, motet for mezzo-soprano, soprano & continuo
- Exulta, gaude, filia Sion, motet for 2 sopranos & continuo 1675
- Exurge, cor meum, in cithara, motet for soprano, 2 violins, viole & continuo 1670
- Ardens est cor nostrum [meum], motet for soprano, alto, tenor, bass & continuo 1664
- Desiderata nobis, motet for alto, tenor, bass & continuo 1667

=== Masses ===
- Missa "Sciolto havean dall'alte sponde," mass for 5 voices & continuo

== In popular culture ==
Samuel Pepys was delighted with Carissimi's music. His Diary records that he met "Mr. Hill, and Andrews, and one slovenly and ugly fellow, Seignor Pedro, who sings Italian songs to the theorbo most neatly, and they spent the whole evening in singing the best piece of musique counted of all hands in the world, made by Seignor Charissimi, the famous master in Rome. Fine it was, indeed, and too fine for me to judge of."

Carissimi is the viewpoint character for the "Euterpe" series of short stories by Enrico M. Toro within the 1632 series of books edited by Eric Flint.
