= Organ concertos, Op. 7 (Handel) =

Set of organ concertos by George Frideric Handel

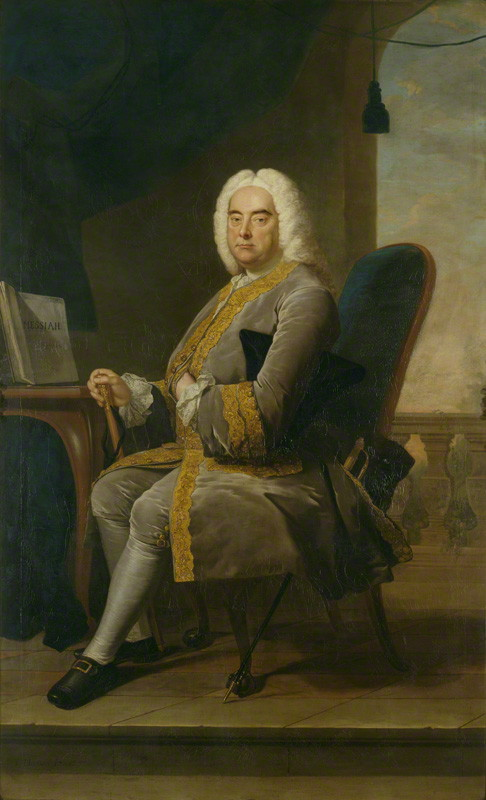
Portrait of George Frideric Handel by Thomas Hudson, 1756

The Handel organ concertos, Op. 7, HWV 306–311, refer to the six organ concertos for organ and orchestra composed by George Frideric Handel in London between 1740 and 1751, published posthumously in 1761 by John Walsh the Younger. They were written for performance during Handel's oratorios, contain almost entirely original material, including some of his most popular and inspired movements.

A fine and delicate touch, a volant finger, and a ready delivery of passages the most difficult, are the praise of inferior artists: they were not noticed in Handel, whose excellencies were of a far superior kind; and his amazing command of the instrument, the fullness of his harmony, the grandeur and dignity of his style, the copiousness of his imagination, and the fertility of his invention were qualities that absorbed every inferior attainment. When he gave a concerto, his method in general was to introduce it with a voluntary movement on the diapasons, which stole on the ear in a slow and solemn progression; the harmony close wrought, and as full as could possibly be expressed; the passages concatenated with stupendous art, the whole at the same time being perfectly intelligible, and carrying the appearance of great simplicity. This kind of prelude was succeeded by the concerto itself, which he executed with a degree of spirit and firmness that no one ever pretended to equal.

— Sir John Hawkins, General History of the Science and Practice of Music. 1776.

== Works ==
HWV	Opus	Key	Composed	Premiere	Venue	Published	Movements	Notes
306	Op. 7, No. 1	B♭ major	17 February 1740	27 February 1740	London, Lincoln's Inn Fields Theatre	1761	Andante – Andante – Largo e piano – Fuga (Allegro)-Organ ad libitum – Bourrée	First movement includes an independent pedal part. Fuga and ad libitum often less played.
307	Op. 7, No. 2	A major	5 February 1743	18 February 1743	London, Covent Garden Theatre	1761	Ouverture – A tempo ordinario – Organo ad libitum – Allegro	Performed with the oratorio Samson (HWV 57)
308	Op. 7, No. 3	B♭ major	1–4 January 1751	1 March 1751	London, Covent Garden Theatre	1761	Allegro – Organo (Adagio e Fuga) ad libitum – Spiritoso – Menuet – Menuet	Two variant autographs of 1st movement. Handel's last orchestral work
309	Op. 7, No. 4	D minor	circa 1744^{?}	14 February 1746^{?}		1761	Adagio – Allegro – Organo ad libitum – Allegro	Performed with premiere of "The Occasional Oratorio" (HWV 62)^{?}
310	Op. 7, No. 5	G minor	31 January 1750	16 March 1750	London, Covent Garden Theatre	1761	Allegro ma non troppo e staccato – Andante larghetto e staccato – Menuet – Gavotte	Performed with Theodora (HWV 68). The second movement is based off Pachelbel's Canon in D's chord progression. Final gavotte in published version probably added later by Smith Jr.
311	Op. 7, No. 6	B♭ major	circa 1748–1749	1749		1761	Pomposo – Organo ad libitum – A tempo ordinario	Assembled by John Christopher Smith after Handel's death for John Walsh the younger's publication

Organ Concerto, Op. 7, No. 1, HWV 306
1. Andante. 2. Andante

3. Largo e piano
Performed by the Advent Chamber Orchestra with David Schrader (organ)

== Borrowings ==
- HWV 306 – Originally composed material. The first movement contains a quotation from the Passacaglia in the Suite in G minor for harpsichord, HWV 432. The less played fuga is borrowed from the second movement of Handel’s Concerto Grosso Op. 6, No. 11.
- HWV 307 – The last movement is based on La Coquette from Suite No.6 of Componimenti musicali by Gottlieb Muffat.
- HWV 308 – The second minuet is by an unidentified composer.
- HWV 309 – The second movement is borrowed from Georg Philipp Telemann's Tafelmusik (1733) and the last from his own Concerto, Op. 3, No. 6.
- HWV 310 – The first movement contains themes derived from the Trio sonatas, Op. 2, No. 1 and No. 8. The second movement uses Pachelbel’s Canon in D, chord progression; this, however, does not necessarily constitute a borrowing. The closing Gavotte is a more elaborate reworking of a movement from the organ concerto, Op. 4, No. 3. The final gavotte is also thematically related to the aria from Agrippina (HWV 6), "Non ho cor che per amarti...".
- HWV 311 – Originally composed material.

== Organo ad libitum ==
Although a complete version of the first set of organ concertos, Op. 4 appeared in Handel's lifetime in 1738, many of the concertos of the posthumous Op. 7 set have missing movements and sections, where Handel would have either used an existing movement solo keyboard from one of his other works or improvised directly. In the case of Op. 7, No.1, HWV 306, Handel actually indicates that parts of the Passacaglia from the Suite in G minor HWV 432 for harpsichord are to be played; the score already contains quotations for this work. It is also reported by contemporaries that Handel would often play a slow and quiet voluntary for organ solo as a prelude to his concertos.

After Handel's death, his amanuensis and personal assistant John Christopher Smith collaborated with the mechanical organ maker John Langshaw (1725–1798) in transcribing a selection of Handel's works for chamber barrel organ. Two mechanical "organ machines", operated by a hand crank, were constructed for John Stuart, 3rd Earl of Bute: the first had 58 barrels, 32 of which were devoted to works by Handel, and was built by the organ-builder John Snetzler and clockmaker Christopher Pinchbeck in 1763, a year after Stuart became Prime Minister; a second had 6 extra barrels and was built by the Bond Street watchmaker Alexander Cumming, who left a detailed inventory for each barrel, including timings in seconds for each movement. One barrel contained the concertos Op. 4, No. 5 and Op. 7, No.3 and another the concerto Op. 7, No.4 with the ad libitum slow movement provided by the sarabande and variations on La Folia from Handel's Suite in D minor for harpsichord HWV 437. Cumming's inventory is all that survives of these organs, one having been destroyed in a fire in 1843. There is an existing set of barrels, however, for the chamber barrel organ made by Henry Holland around 1790, formerly in the Colt Clavier Collection and now at Hammerwood Park in Sussex. These contain two concertos HWV 290 and 294 from Op. 4 with elaborate ornamentation supplied by Smith and have been recorded by Erato.

Two modern performing editions of the concertos by the organists and musicologists Peter Williams and Ton Koopman provide missing movements and give suggestions for the ad libitum passages, possibly too earthbound according to some commentators. The recordings of the organists George Malcolm (1976) and Richard Egarr (2009) give further possibilities, which have so far not appeared in printed editions.

== Characteristics ==
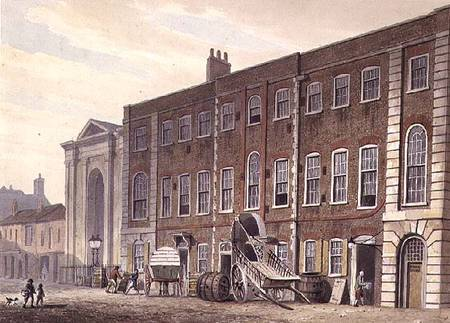
George Shepherd, 1811: Lincoln's Inn Fields Theatre, where Handel moved with his company in November 1739 and where his organ concerto HWV 306 was first performed in 1740

- HWV 306 – First performed on the double manual organ in the theatre in Lincoln's Inn Fields, this is the unique concerto of the series with a pedal part, the pedalboard probably having been coupled to the lower register of one of the keyboards for the occasion. It is on a grander and more majestic scale than the earlier Op. 4 concertos, written for the more intimate single keyboard chamber organ. The first and second movements together form a single chaconne over a ground bass, over which the organ plays a series of simple but arresting variations. There is a chaconne-like bass in the following largo. The next but more often skipped movement is a fuga played in a lively and fast paced tempo with violins and violas starting the movement joined by the basso continuo. The less played fuga gives way to an ad-libitum by the soloist, which leads to the brilliant and tuneful closing bourrée.
- HWV 307 – This concerto is more lyrical and on a smaller scale than the first, with an unscored third movement.
- HWV 308 – Also on a grand scale, this concerto opens with an allegro based on a motive similar to Handel's Hallelujah Chorus. It is followed by a long spiritoso based on a hornpipe. An unscored adagio and fugue leads into the two concluding minuets.
- HWV 309 – The fourth concerto starts with a noble elegiac adagio, with passages alternating between divided cellos and bassoons and the solo organ. It is followed by an energetic and majestic allegro. An unscored slow movement leads into a lively finale in 3/8 time.
- HWV 310 – In the opening movement, vigorous unison tutti passages alternate with more complex chromatic passages for organ alone. An improvised adagio leads into a grand andante larghetto, a series of variations for the organ over an ostinato bass (using Pachelbel's Canon in D's chord progression), marked piano until the forte of the last variation. The concerto concludes with a conventional minuet and gavotte.
- HWV 311 – This concerto, similar in form to a Vivaldi concerto, has three movements, the second unscored and the last containing three ad libitum sections.

== Discography ==
- George Malcolm (organ), Academy of St Martin in the Fields. 1976
- Handel Organ Concertos, Op. 7, Nos. 1–6; Organ Concertos, Op. 4, Nos. 1–6. Herbert Tachezi (organ), Nikolaus Harnoncourt (conductor), Concentus Musicus Wien. Teldec – 8573 87790 2-CD set (originally released on LP, 1982)
- Handel Organ Concertos, Op. 7, The English Concert, Simon Preston (organ), Trevor Pinnock (conductor), Archiv Produktion, 1984
- Peter Hurford (organ), Concertgebouw Chamber Orchestra. Decca 1987
- Handel Organ Concertos. Paul Nicholson (organ), Brandenburg Consort. Recorded on the organ of St Lawrence's Church, Whitchurch. Hyperion 1996
- Handel Organ Concertos, Op. 7, Academy of Ancient Music, Richard Egarr (organ), Harmonia Mundi, HMU807447/48, 2009. Partly recorded on the Handel House Organ in St George's, Hanover Square.

== See also ==
- Organ concertos, Op. 4 (Handel)
- List of concertos by George Frideric Handel

== Notes ==
Sources

- Abraham, Gerald (1954), Handel: A Symposium, Oxford University Press, pp. 229–231, Chapter 7 by Basil Lam (list of self-borrowings)
- Burrows, Donald (1997), The Cambridge Companion to Handel, Cambridge Companions to Music, Cambridge University Press, ISBN 0-521-45613-4
- Burrows, Donald; Dunhill, Rosemary (2002), Music and Theatre in Handel's World: The Family Papers of James Harris, 1732–1780, Oxford University Press, ISBN 0-19-816654-0
- Dean, Winton (2006), Handel Operas 1726–1741, Boydell & Brewer, ISBN 1-84383-268-2
- Derr, Ellwood (1991). "Review of new editions of Handel Organ Concertos, Op. 7 by Peter Williams and Ton Koopman & Jan Kleinbussink". Notes. 47 (3): 953–955. doi:10.2307/941938. JSTOR 941938.
- Malloch, William (1983). "The Earl of Bute's machine organ: A touchstone of taste". Early Music. 11 (2): 172–183. doi:10.1093/earlyj/11.2.172.
