= Langshaw =

Langshaw may refer to:

- Langshaw (surname), a surname
- Langshaw, Queensland, a locality in the Gympie Region, Queensland, Australia
- Langshaw Barrel Organ, an organ in the collections of Lancashire Museums
