= Longshaw (disambiguation) =

Longshaw is an area within on the outskirts of Greater Manchester.

Longshaw may also refer to:

- Longshaw (surname), a family name
- Longshaw Estate, an area within Peak District National Park, in Derbyshire, England
- USS Longshaw, a Fletcher-class destroyer in the United States Navy
- 95882 Longshaw, a minor celestial body
