= Nabal (disambiguation) =

Nabal was a rich Calebite, according to the 1st Book of Samuel Chapter 25.

Nabal may also refer to:

- Nabal (Handel), an oratorio by George Frideric Handel
- Nabal (instrument), a long, straight brass horn
