= Langshaw Barrel Organ =

Home use English organ from c. 1790

The chamber barrel organ by John Langshaw in the collections of Lancashire Museums is currently on display at the Judges' Lodgings museum in the city of Lancaster, England.

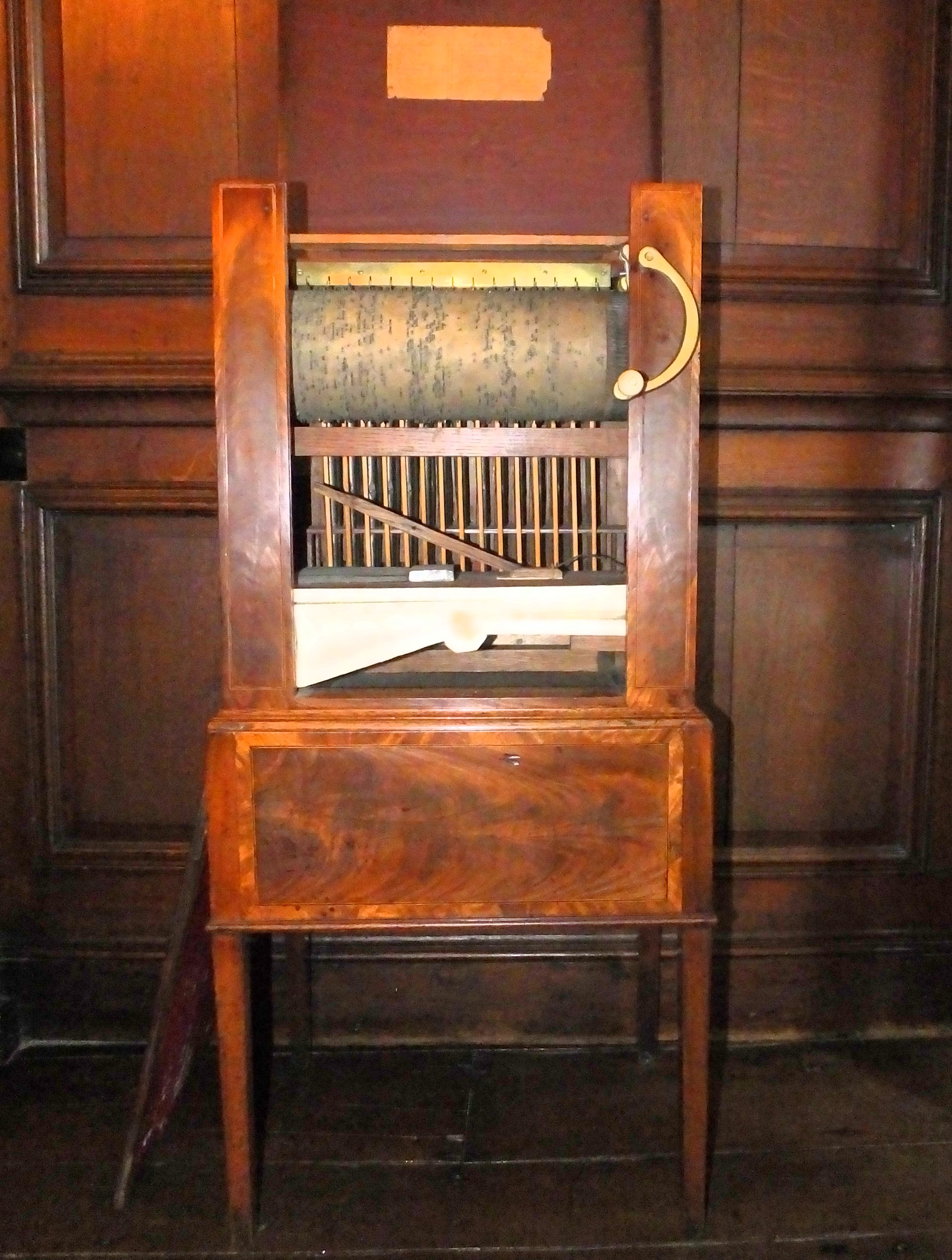
The Langshaw barrel organ in the Judges' Lodgings. Its decorative front has been removed allowing a barrel to be seen.

The organ was built c 1790 and is of a size suitable for use in a middle-class home. It has four ranks of pipes (stops) and three barrels. The barrels are inscribed "John Langshaw / Organ Maker / Lancaster", and are assumed to be the barrels originally housed in the instrument. The mahogany case is attributed to Gillows, a Lancaster furniture making firm with which Langshaw is known to have collaborated.

Each of the three barrels is pinned with 10 airs. The 30 pieces preserved at Lancaster include "See the Conquering Hero Comes", the best-known number from Handel's oratorio Judas Maccabaeus. Langshaw lived in London in the years either side of Handel's death in 1759. While Lancashire Museums suggest that he knew Handel, other sources suggest that his reproductions of Handel's music began after the composer's death.

== Display ==
The organ is currently displayed in a period setting in the Judges' Lodgings.

Visitors are able to hear a recording of the instrument.

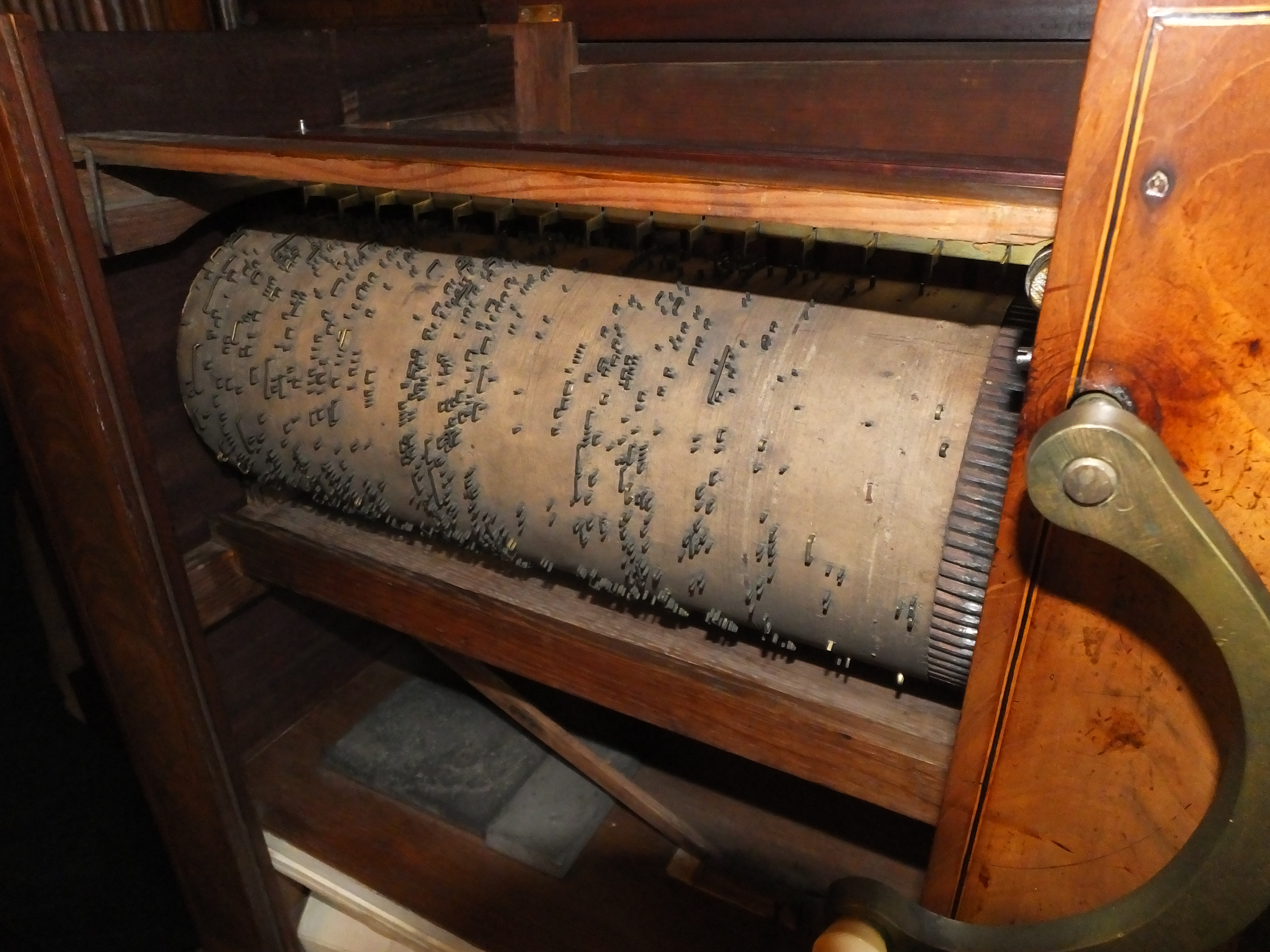
Close up of barrel

== See also ==
- St John the Evangelist's Church, Lancaster
