= Langshaw (surname) =

Langshaw is a locational surname from Dumfriesshire. The name has English origins, meaning "Dweller at the Long Wood", from the Old English words lang and sceaga. Lang- is a common prefix for place names that have become surnames meaning "long", and -shaw is an ending for many such names, meaning "woodland". Langshaw may also be a variant of Longshaw.

Notable people with this surname include:

- John Langshaw (1725–1798), English organist and an organ-builder
- John Langshaw Austin (1911–1960), English philosopher of language
- Maxwell Langshaw (born c. 1941), Australian cyclist
- Phillip Langshaw (born 1938), Australian singer
- Stanley Langshaw (1901–1936), English rugby player
