= List of variations on Pachelbel's Canon =

Pachelbel's Canon
Arranged for violins, harps, and bass by Kevin MacLeod

Johann Pachelbel's Canon in D major, written in the mid-Baroque period and revived from obscurity in the 1960s, has been credited with inspiring pop songs.

Some pop songs borrow its chord progression, bass line, or melodic structure, a phenomenon attributed to the memorability and simplicity of the work. The Canon also shares roots with other, more significant chord progressions that lay the foundations of modern pop music. Its perceived ubiquity is itself an object of cultural discussion.

== History and analysis ==
The bassline and harmonic analysis of Pachelbel's Canon

Pachelbel's Canon was written sometime in the late 17th or early 18th century by Johann Pachelbel. It was not widely appreciated by his contemporaries; in fact, it was largely forgotten by history for hundreds of years. Interest in Pachelbel's work increased in the early 20th century with the revival of Baroque-era compositions, but the Canon remained relatively obscure until the 1960s.

Alexandra S. Levine, writing for The New York Times, said a late-1960s recording by French conductor Jean-François Paillard led to the piece's ubiquity in pop music and at events such as weddings and funerals. Ilario Colli, writing for Limelight, traces Pachelbel's influence on modern pop to the Bee Gees' 1966 single "Spicks and Specks", which has a bass line and sequence of chords nearly identical to the Canon.

"Pachelbel's Howitzer"
Arrangement for piano, adapted to multiple genres

Suzannah Clark, a music professor at Harvard, connected the piece's resurgence in popularity to the harmonic structure, a common pattern similar to the romanesca. The harmonies are complex, but combine into a pattern that is easily understood by the listener with the help of the canon format, a style in which the melody is staggered across multiple voices (as in "Three Blind Mice"). Colli says the bassline and its repetition are the main factor in the Canon's popularity. The repeated use of perfect fourths in the bass line, as well as its repetition, helps the listener understand and latch onto the music, and makes it easily reproducible in a variety of genres. The harmonic structure is also similar to the I–V–vi–IV progression, which is much more common in pop music.

Chorus of "Memories", by Maroon 5

Snippet of Pachelbel's Canon
Maroon 5's "Memories" takes part of its melody, as well as its harmonic structure, from Pachelbel's Canon

Not many pop songs use the Canon's exact chord structure; one is Vitamin C's "Graduation (Friends Forever)". But many use a similar structure, omitting a chord or otherwise modifying the structure of the harmony; examples include Green Day's "Basket Case". Maroon 5's "Memories" takes its harmonic structure from the Canon and the beginning of its hook from a snippet of the Canon's violin melody. Acts like Maroon 5 were able to interpolate the piece because it is in the public domain, no longer covered by copyright protection.

The perceived ubiquity of Pachelbel's Canon is itself an object of notoriety. It has inspired songs such as Rob Paravonian's "Pachelbel Rant" and the Axis of Awesome's "Four Chords", which comment on the number of popular songs borrowing the same tune or harmonic structure. "Four Chords" does not directly focus on the chords from Pachelbel's Canon, instead focusing on the I–V–vi–IV progression.

Producer Pete Waterman of Stock Aitken Waterman, which used the Canon as the inspiration for Kylie Minogue's single "I Should Be So Lucky", referred to it as "almost the godfather of pop music".

== List of songs ==
- "Spicks and Specks", a 1966 single by the Bee Gees
- "Rain and Tears", a 1968 single by Aphrodite's Child
- "Oh Lord, Why Lord", a 1968 single by Pop-Tops
- "One Tin Soldier", a 1969 song by the Original Caste
- "Streets of London", a 1969 song by Ralph McTell
- "Isn't Life Strange", a 1972 single by the Moody Blues
- "No Woman, No Cry", a 1974 single by Bob Marley and the Wailers
- "Three Variations", the B-side of Brian Eno's 1975 album Discreet Music
- "Go West", a 1979 single by Village People
- "Goodbye to Romance", from Ozzy Osbourne's 1980 album Blizzard of Ozz
- "I Dreamed a Dream", from the 1980 Les Misérables soundtrack
- "I Should Be So Lucky", a 1987 single by Kylie Minogue
- "All Together Now", a 1990 single by the Farm
- "Cryin'", a 1993 single by Aerosmith
- "Go West", a 1993 single by Pet Shop Boys
- "Hook", from Blues Traveler's 1994 album Four
- "Basket Case", a 1994 single by Green Day
- "Life Goes On", from 2Pac's 1996 album All Eyez on Me
- "Get Me Away from Here, I'm Dying", from Belle and Sebastian's 1996 album If You're Feeling Sinister
- "C U When U Get There", a 1997 single by Coolio
- "Christmas Canon", from the Trans-Siberian Orchestra's 1998 album The Christmas Attic
- "Ladies and Gentlemen We Are Floating in Space (I Can't Help Falling in Love)", from Spiritualized's 1997 album Ladies and Gentlemen We Are Floating in Space
- "Graduation (Friends Forever)", a 2000 single by Vitamin C
- "Home Town", from Joe Jackson's album Big World
- "Canon in D Major", from the Jacques Loussier Trio's 2001 album Baroque Favorites
- "Paris", from Delerium's 2004 album The Best Of
- "Canon Rock", a 2005 song by JerryC
- "Welcome to the Black Parade", a 2006 single by My Chemical Romance
- "Pachelbel Rant", from Rob Paravonian's 2009 album Songs from the Second Floor
- "We Dance On", a 2010 single by N-Dubz
- "Would You Stay for Tea?", from Hello Venus' 2013 EP of the same name
- "Rockelbel's Canon (Pachelbel Canon in D)", from the Piano Guys' 2013 album The Piano Guys 2
- "Step", a 2013 single by Vampire Weekend
- "Sunday Morning", from Procol Harum's 2017 album Novum
- "Beautiful in White", a 2017 song by Shane Filan
- "Fancy", from Doja Cat's 2018 album Amala
- "Memories", a 2019 single by Maroon 5
- "Full of Life", from Christine and the Queens' 2023 album Paranoia, Angels, True Love

== See also ==
- List of chord progressions
