= Soosiz =

2009 video game

- App icon
- Developer: Touch Foo
- Publisher: Touch Foo
- Platform: iOS
- Release: October 9, 2009
- Genre: Platformer
- Mode: Single-player

Soosiz is a 2009 platformer game developed by the Finnish studio Touch Foo. It was released for iOS on October 9, 2009.

== Gameplay ==
Across 65 levels, the main aim of the game is for the protagonist to find his scattered friends and save the world from a great evil.

== Development and release ==
Soosiz was created by two brothers, Vile and Tuomas Mäkynen. Vile did the programming, basing the game off of an earlier PC title he made for a game design competition in 2006, while Tuomas drew the character designs. The artwork used for the app icon was drawn by a fan.

The music used in the game was composed by Kevin Macleod, a well-known royalty-free musician who allows free use of his music under a Creative Commons copyright license.

Soosiz was released for iOS on October 9, 2009, with a free Lite version on November 21, 2009 and an HD version for iPad on April 3, 2010. In 2018, Soosiz was updated to a universal app for iPhone and iPad, replacing the separate HD version, and became free with in-game ads. Ads do not appear for players who bought the game before it was made free and can be disabled with an in-app purchase.

== Reception ==
Reception

Aggregate score
Aggregator	Score
Metacritic	86/100

Review score
Publication	Score
TouchArcade	5/5

On Metacritic, Soosiz has a "generally favorable" score of 86 based on four critics.

Multiple critics gave positive reviews.
