= Cockin =

Cockin is a surname. Notable people with the surname include:

- Frederic Cockin (1888–1969), Bishop of Bristol
- George Cockin (1908–1996), bishop of Owerri
- John Cockin (1939–2024), English golfer
- William Cockin (1736–1801), English schoolmaster and author
