= The Tempest (Smith) =

Opera by composer John Christopher Smith

The Tempest or The Enchanted Isle is an opera in three acts by composer John Christopher Smith. The work's English-language libretto by David Garrick is based on the 1611 play of the same name by William Shakespeare. The opera premiered on 11 February 1756 in London at the Theatre Royal, Drury Lane.

== Roles ==
Role	Voice type	Premiere cast, 11 February 1756 (Conductor: )
Prospero/Trinculo	tenor	John Beard
Miranda/Ariel	soprano	Vernon
Ferdinand	mezzo-soprano	Rosa Curioni
Calibano	bass	Samuel Champness
