= Royalty Free: The Music of Kevin MacLeod =

2020 US documentary film

- Theatrical release poster
- Directed by: Ryan Camarda
- Produced by: Ryan Camarda; Ari M. Greenberg
- Starring: Kevin MacLeod; Hank Green; Derek Muller; Thomas Ridgewell; Steven Williams; Jack Vale
- Narrated by: Ryan Camarda
- Music by: Kevin MacLeod
- Production companies: West of Worldly Productions; Crazy Basta Productions
- Distributed by: First Run Features
- Release dates: October 17, 2020 (Julien Dubuque International Film Festival); March 29, 2022 (United States)
- Running time: 91 minutes
- Country: United States
- Language: English

Royalty Free: The Music of Kevin MacLeod is a 2020 American documentary film about the composer Kevin MacLeod. The film documents the life of Kevin MacLeod and how he became one of the most-heard composers in the world, with his work ending up in millions of videos and thousands of films. The film deals with the digital audio revolution and the question of its relationship to technological unemployment.

The film premiered at the Julien Dubuque International Film Festival on 17 October 2020. The film was acquired by First Run Features and was released on 29 March 2022.

== Reception ==
=== Critical response ===
On the review aggregator website Rotten Tomatoes, 89% of 9 critics' reviews are positive.

=== Awards and nominations ===
- Best New England Feature Documentary, 2021 Shawna Shea Film Festival
- Best Documentary Feature Nominee, 2021 Beloit International Film Festival
