= Longshaw (surname) =

Longshaw is a habitational surname of Old English origin. It comes from either Longshaw in Greater Manchester, Langshaw Wood in Great Ribston in Yorkshire, or Longshaw in Bradnop. All of these place names come from the Old English words lang and sceaga, meaning "long" and "corpse" respectively. The Middle English word shawe means "a woodland", and comes from the Old English sceaga, giving the Longshaw surname the meaning of a "dweller at the Long Wood".

Notable people with the surname include:

- Ted Longshaw (1926–2011), British businessman
- William Longshaw Jr. (1839–1865), American naval physician

== See also ==
- Langshaw (surname)
