= Johann Christoph Schmidt =

Musician and copyist (b. 1683, d. 1763)

Johann Christoph Schmidt (3 March 1683 – 1763) was a musician and music copyist to Handel. After settling in London, he anglicized his name to John Christopher Smith; to avoid confusion with his son of the same name, he is referred to as John Christopher Smith sr. He may also be referred to as "John Christopher Smith the elder".

Born in Kitzingen, Prince-Bishopric of Würzburg, Schmidt probably studied at Halle, where he met Handel. He moved in 1705 to Nuremberg, and then, a couple of years later, to Ansbach. In Ansbach he was a wool merchant and amateur musician, until about 1716 when Handel visited and convinced him to move and become a professional musician. By 1720, he and his family had settled in London, where he was making a living as a viola player and as Handel's copyist, as Handel's treasurer, and through his music shop in Coventry Street. Smith sr. employed his wife and children as copyists, including his son John Christopher Smith, who became Handel's amanuensis later on.

John Christopher Smith was born in 1712. His father, John Christopher Schmidt ["Schmidt was the German name corresponding with the English appellation Smith."], of Anspach [sic] in Franconia, after receiving a good education in the university of Halle, married a lady with a portion [dowry] of seven thousand crowns, and settled in his native city. He carried on a considerable branch of traffic in the woollen trade, in which he might have acquired a large fortune, had he not been seduced by his passion for music; when Handel arrived at Anspach in 1716, he renewed an acquaintance which had commenced at Halle, and soon became so captivated with that great master's power, that he left his wife and children in Germany, and accompanied Handel to England, where he regulated the expences [sic] of his public performance, and filled the office of treasurer with great exactness and fidelity. On the fourth year of his residence in England, he sent for his wife and family, which consisted of a son and two daughters[.]

— William Coxe (1799)

From Halle, Handel went on to Anspach, where he met Johann Christoph Schmidt,, an old friend of his University days. Schmidt had a large family and not a pfennig with which to keep them. His was precisely the sort of case that appealed to Handel. He could not leave Schmidt to his penury. Schmidt could be useful to him; he would make him useful. So he told Schmidt frankly that he could not afford to transport him and all his belongings to England, but if he had a taste for adventure he might leave the family behind in the care of friends, and return to London with him. Schmidt agreed. He found someone willing to assume responsibility for his family in Anspach—a thing easier done in those days than now—and set out for England with Handel. It was the beginning of a great friendship. Schmidt became plain Mr Smith in London, and soon spoke the King's English quite elegently. A year later he had saved enough to send to Anspach for his family, and soon the whole tribe of Schmidts were nestled under the wing of Handel; including little John Christopher Smith, then five years old.

— Newman Flower (1923)

Smith sr. and Handel worked well together and were close friends until the late 1740s, when Smith sr. tried to persuade Handel to co-operative with the Middlesex Opera Company. Relations between the two men grew worse, and they were estranged for much of the 1750s. John Smith jr. managed to reconcile them shortly before Handel's death.
