= Gideon (Handel) =

1769 oratorio pastiche

George Frideric Handel

Gideon (no HWV number) is an oratorio pastiche compiled largely from the works of George Frideric Handel by John Christopher Smith. It was first performed on 10 February 1769 at Covent Garden, London.

Half of this oratorio is derived from the works of Handel ("75:17 for the Handel elements and 76:36 for those by Smith" in Georg Friedrich Händel and John Christopher Smith – Gideon (Junge Kantorei - Frankfurt Barockorchester - Joachim Carlos Martini - 2004)), but Smith used an overture and six vocal items from his oratorio of 1762 The Feast of Darius.

== Dramatis personae ==
- Gideon (tenor)
- Oreb (soprano)
- Joash (bass)
- Angel (soprano)
- Three Israelites (soprano)
- Messenger (soprano)
- Israelite (countertenor)
- Prophet (bass)
- Priest of Baal (bass)
