= John Langshaw =

English organist and organ builder (1725–1798)

John Langshaw (1725–1798) was an English organist and an organ-builder. Leaving organ cases to others, he specialised in the mechanics, in particular those of chamber barrel organs. He left his native Lancashire to work in London, but returned to Lancashire in 1770.

An example of Langshaw's work is in the Judges' Lodgings museum Lancaster. The mahogany case is almost certainly by Gillows, while the barrels are inscribed "John Langshaw / Organ Maker / Lancaster".

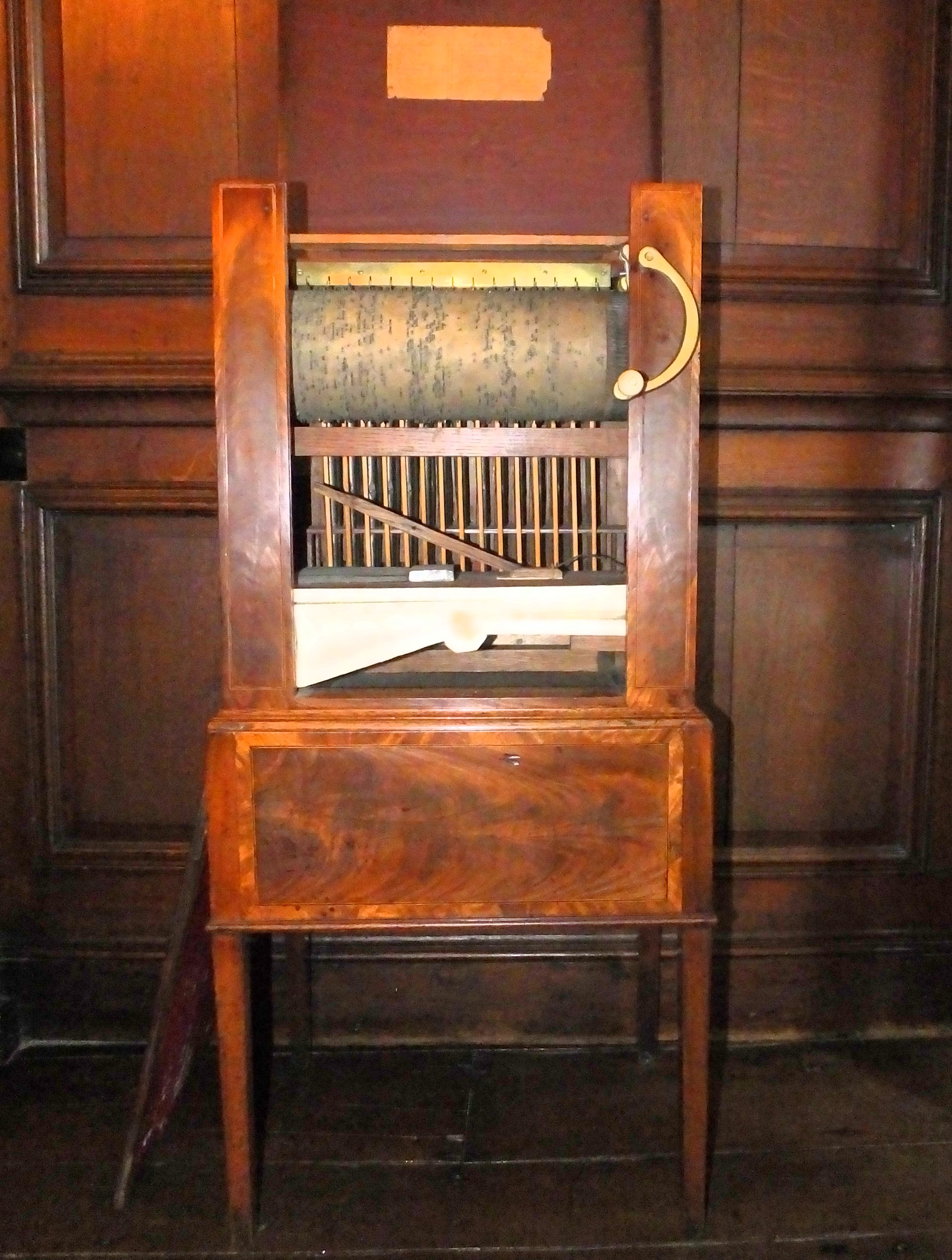
The Judges' Lodgings chamber barrel organ, with its decorative front removed.

Langshaw is not to be confused with his eldest son, also named John Langshaw. Langshaw Jr. assisted his father as an organ-builder, but was more active as an organist and teacher, as well as an agent for the piano manufacturer Broadwood.

== Life ==
John Langshaw was baptised in All Saints', the parish church of Wigan, in 1725. He was the son of John Langshaw of Wigan ( ? –1772), a pewterer and his wife Anne (? –1761), née Ann Aspinall. The Langshaws have been described as coming from Upholland, near Wigan. He suffered a childhood accident that left him lame, and at the age of seventeen on 2 October 1742 he petitioned the court leet for a paid post in the Wigan Waits. The waits performed music on civic occasions; crude though it was, it would be was the only music to be heard outside the church. A year later, a subsequent petition claimed he had mastered the violin. In 1744 he has left. (Note: In London music was Baroque– not so in the provinces where music was learned in the church and from the soldiers in the militias fighting in the Jacobite Wars.) In 1744, there was no stage coach between Wigan and London, and journeys were made on horse back. In 1745, Bonnie Prince Charlie, had marched down through Catholic Lancashire, to his defeat at Derby. (Note: In retreat through Lancaster, an officer had played The King shall have his own again on the Lancaster Priory Organ.)

By 1754 he was in London and had composed two works that were published by John Sadler of Liverpool alongside new works by Handel. John Langshaw was part of a small circle of London musicians, organists and inventors centred round John Christopher Smith, Handel's amanuensis. Langshaw became involved in a project to provide the Earl of Bute with a self playing organ. The Earl went on to commission other instruments. Langshaw pinned barrels for him for 12 years from 1762 to 1774. By the end of this time he had moved back to Lancashire and was sending barrels to London by ship.

He married Mary Haydock (1733–1800) at St James's Church, Piccadilly in May 1762. They had nine children, five of whom were baptised at St James. Jack was the first: born in 1763, and baptised John, a name he would revert to after his father's death. George was born in 1764, Ann and Mary died in infancy, then Elizabeth in 1770. John wished to return to the country for the benefit of his health and was appointed organist at Wigan Parish Church in 1770. This was close to his family. For two years he stayed there playing and repairing the organ, using the London firm Byfield and Green. Accounts show he was paid £20 pa, with an extra £4 for doing a tuning. He moved to a better-paid post as organist at Lancaster Priory in 1772. His duties included playing repaing the organ and playing it 4 days a week, and giving piano lessons to a Miss Parrin. For this he received £100 pa. Here his other four children were born: William, James, Joseph and Benjamin. The Earl of Bute nominated 8 year old George for a 'Poor Scholarship' at Charterhouse School. Jack was sent to the Lancaster Old Grammar School, and was taught the organ by his father. (Note: The curriculum was a diet of classics and latin in one room, in another William Cockin the author of 'Rational and practical treatise on arithmetic (1774)' taught writing and accounts.) John used all his carefully cultivated London connections to secure a place for Jack as pupil to Dr Benjamin Cooke. Befriended by the Charles Wesley, Jack made contacts in the London musical world . He returned to become organist at St John's Church, on an organ he had helped build. Elizabeth was married to Thomas Green, a schoolmaster at Winnwick Grammar School.

On his death, his son Jack succeeded him as organist of Lancaster Priory, and then called himself John. Jack used to act as a 'country friend' (Note: Country Friend: A term used for someone who acted as an agent, often organists selling pianos to their pupils. These were then delivered by Pickfords over the canal network) for Broadwood Pianos.

== Chamber barrel organs ==
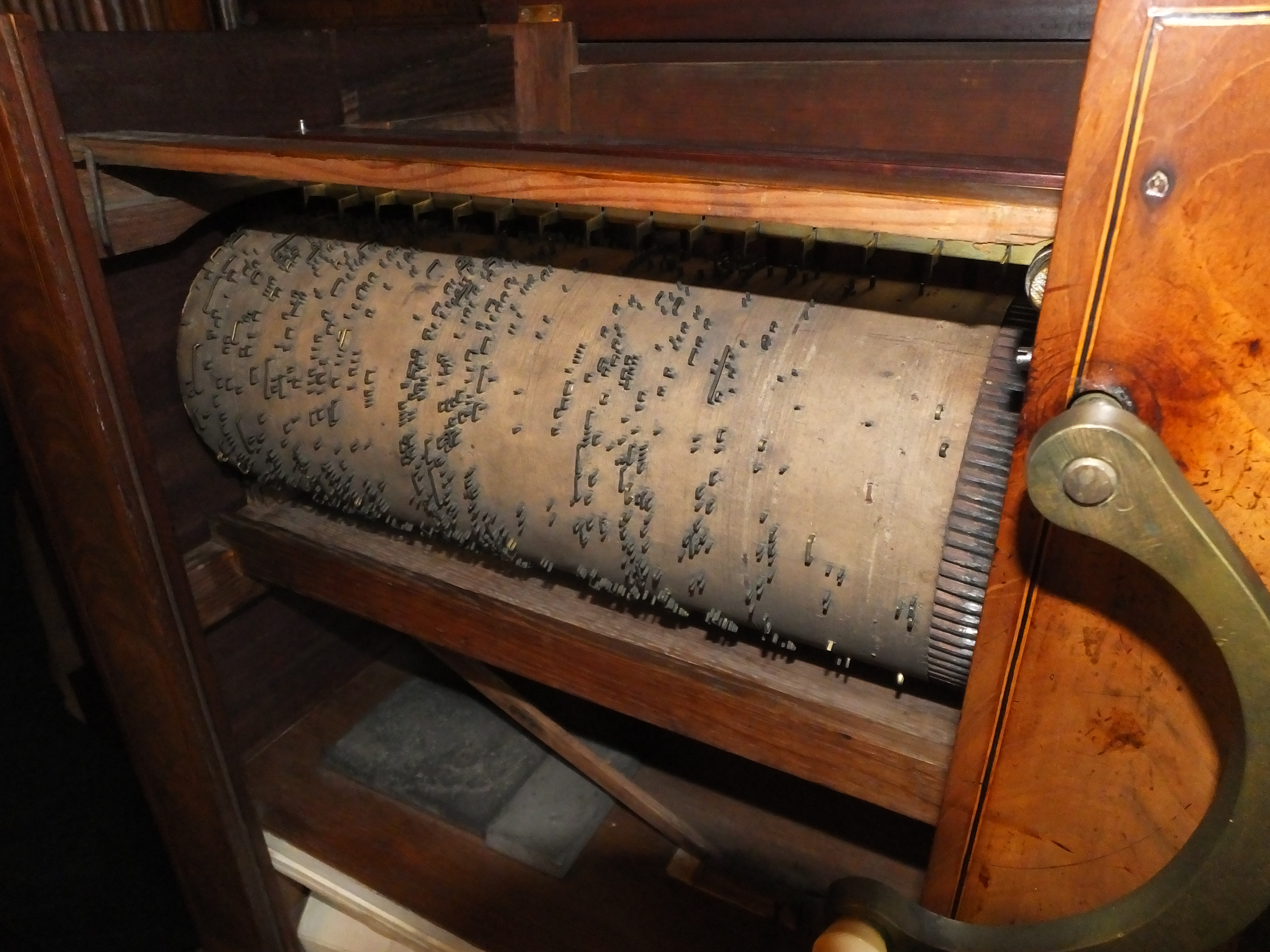
Pins and staples. The 30 pieces preserved at Lancaster include "See the Conquering Hero Comes" from Judas Maccabaeus.

Grove's Dictionary of Music defines a barrel organ as:

A mechanical organ in which a cylinder with protruding pins slowly revolves; the pins raise keys which operate a mechanism that allows wind to enter the required pipes. The wind is provided by bellows pumped by the same rotary motion of a handle that turns the barrel

A chamber barrel organ is one that is designed to play in the salon, and be more refined in its musical rendition than its cousin the hurdy-gurdy. The secret lies in the pinning of the barrel. John Langshaw was renowned for the fineness of his pinning.

=== Langshaw and Handel ===
Handel is known to have been interested in mechanical reproduction of his music. He provided pieces for musical clocks manufactured by Charles Clay who had a shop in the Strand. The nature of the arrangement between composer and clock-maker is not known, but it is assumed to have been a commercial collaboration, as there was a market for musical automata at the time. Like Langshaw, Clay made use of programmed cylinders.

According to one source, Handel respected Langshaw's work. However, Langshaw's main involvement with Handel's music appears to have begun after the composer's death in 1759 when he became involved in a project with John Christopher Smith. Smith, who is best known as the blind composer's amanuensis, collaborated with John Langshaw in transcribing a selection of Handel's works for chamber barrel organ. It is surmised that Langshaw's pinning of Handel's music reflects the actual way the composer played, thus making the barrels subjects of academic study. Long the surviving Handel transcriptions is music from the organ concertos. As the composer (a noted organist) tended to "ad lib" in this repertoire, there is scope for using barrel organs to reconstruct the original ornamentation, something which is not preserved in the printed versions. For example, the organist Richard Egarr, in his recording of the opus 4 set used ornaments preserved on a barrel organ in the Colt collection. This presents a highly ornamented version of Handel's music.

== The organs ==
=== Pipe organs ===
The Langshaws, father and son, built a pipe organ at St John's Church, Lancaster. The instrument, which was dedicated in 1785, has undergone a Victorian rebuild, but retains its original Gillow case made of mahogany in Adam style.

Langshaw is also credited with adding a swell to the Father Smith organ at Kendal Parish Church.

=== Barrel organs ===
==== Lost instruments ====
Among the pieces transcribed by Smith and Langshaw was a selection for a particularly lavish instrument belonging to the Earl of Bute. The Earl, who was evidently fond of Handel's music, commissioned a large number of barrels. The instrument, on which the architect Robert Adam, the watch-maker Christopher Pinchbeck and the organ-builder John Snetzler also collaborated, was installed at his country residence, Luton Hoo (where it was destroyed in a fire in the nineteenth century). The Earl also commissioned an organ for High Cliff, his seaside residence, the barrels being interchangeable between his two organs. This second instrument is believed to be no longer extant, but details of its construction and its barrels were recorded by Alexander Cumming, who was involved in its construction.

In the 1770s an instrument was commissioned for Mary Lowther, the daughter of the Earl of Bute. (Mary later became Countess of Lonsdale when her husband was elevated to the peerage). It is not clear whether this is the same as the undated instrument by Cumming and Snetzler at Lowther Castle, Cumbria, which is documented on the National Pipe Organ Register as having seven barrels.

There was a Langshaw barrel organ at Cartmel Priory.

==== Extant instruments ====
There are three existing Langshaw barrel organs:

- one in an unrevealed location in Southern England with five barrels.
- The Lancaster Organ with three barrels. Built c.1790. Each barrel in pinned with 10 airs. There are four stops
  - a Stopped Diapason (wooden) of 8 ft pitch
  - a Principal (metal) of 4 ft pitch
  - a Twelfth (metal) of 2 2/3 ft pitch
  - a Fifteenth (metal) of 2 ft pitch.
- one in private ownership in Scotland, which is of similar design to the Lancaster organ. It has three barrels: Religious music, Dance Music and Patriotic music.

== See also ==
- Organ concertos, Op. 7 (Handel)
- Lancaster Priory
