= John Christopher Smith =

English composer (1712-1795)

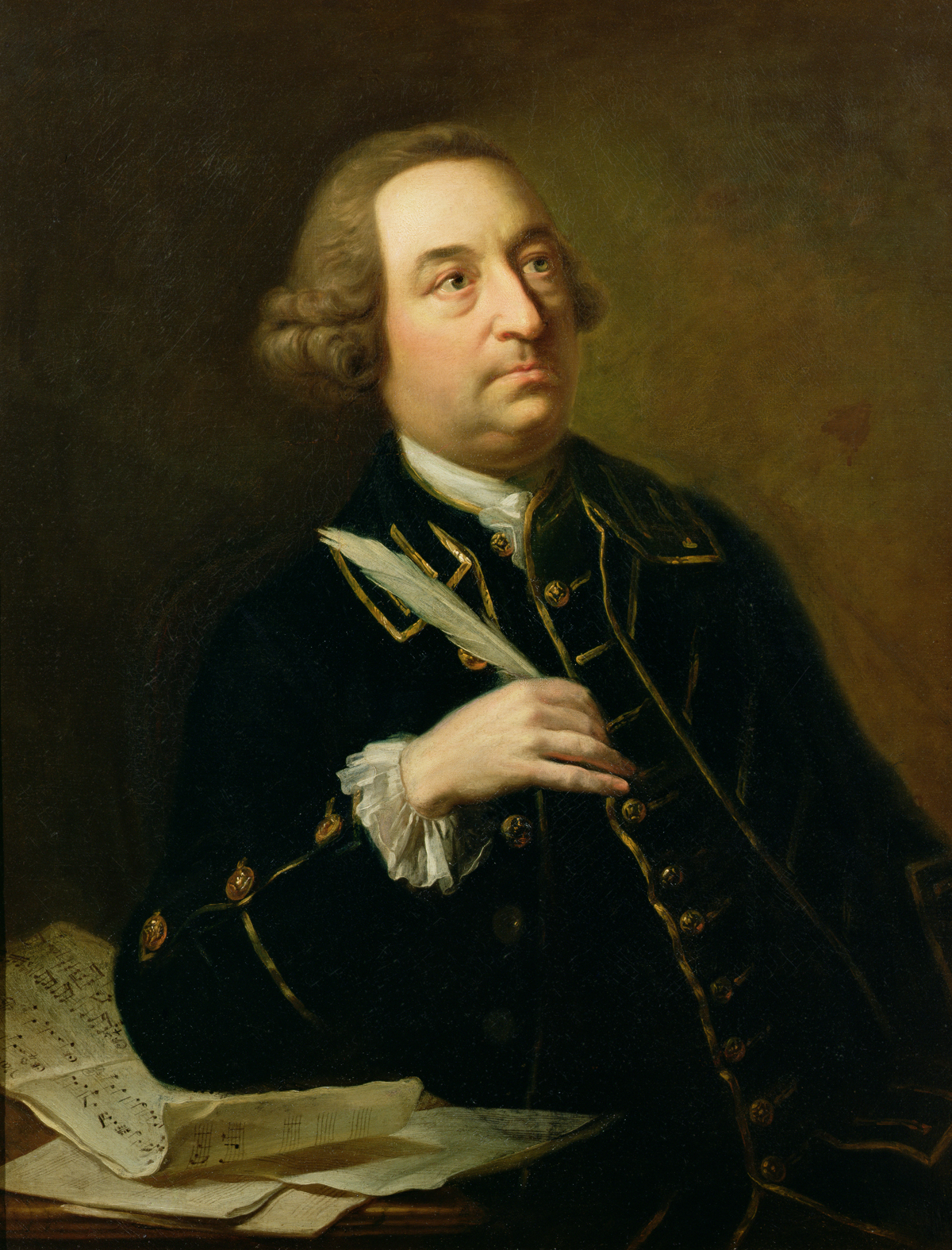
Johan Zoffany: John Christopher Smith, c. 1763.

John Christopher Smith (born Johann Christoph Schmidt; 1712 – 3 October 1795) was an English composer who, following in his father's footsteps, became George Frideric Handel's secretary, student and amanuensis.

== Life ==
John Christopher Smith was the son of Johann Christoph Schmidt (John Christopher Smith Sr.) (died 1763), Handel's first copyist in London. His father, known to Handel from Halle, was summoned from Germany in 1716. He brought his family to London around 1720.

John Christopher Smith Jr. had a few lessons from Handel and Johann Christoph Pepusch but studied mostly with Thomas Roseingrave. He later became Handel's secretary, musical assistant and amanuensis, when blindness prevented Handel from writing or conducting in his later years. The last year when Handel conducted performances of his oratorios was 1752.

Handel fell out with Smith Sr. in the 1750s, but remained on good terms with the son. From 1753 to the composer's death in 1759, Smith conducted Handel's oratorios that were to be performed in those years. Handel bequeathed to Smith the keyboard instruments in his house at 25 Brook Street and his manuscripts.

There was interest in reproducing Handel's music mechanically, using clocks for example. After Handel's death Smith was involved with John Langshaw in a project to transcribe pieces by the composer for barrel organ.

In 1760, he married Martha Coxe, through whom he became step-father to William Coxe.

After the success of his oratorio Paradise Lost in 1760, he became artistic director of the Covent Garden Royal Theatre, a position that he was forced to relinquish for health reasons in 1772. When granted an annual pension by the King in 1774, Smith retired to Bath.

When his wife died in 1785, he moved to Carlisle Street in London's Soho district, where he died in 1795. A blue plaque stands on the site in commemoration.

== Works ==
Smith's first opera was the Italian-style Teraminta on a libretto by Henry Carey and first performed on 20 November 1732 at Lincoln's Inn Fields in London, closely followed by Ulysses on a libretto by Samuel Humphreys, on 17 April 1733 at the same venue. Ulysses turned out to be a resounding failure, after which he resolved not to perform any further operas. In 1740, encouraged by Handel, he decided to organize his own series of subscription concerts. In the course of nine years, he had six operas performed in Italian: Rosalinda on a text by John Lockman (first performed on 4 January 1740 at the Hickford's Rooms in London), Issipile in 1743, Il Ciro riconosciuto in 1744, and three other operas now lost: Dario in 1746, Demofoonte in 1747 and Artaserse in 1749 (all five operas on Metastasio's libretti). Later ones included three written by David Garrick and based on Shakespeare - The Fairies (3 February 1755 at the Drury Lane, London), after A Midsummer Night's Dream, and The Tempest (11 February 1756, Drury Lane, London) - and a successful afterpiece, The Enchanter (13 December 1760, Drury Lane, London). His successful collaboration with Benjamin Stillingfleet produced his last opera Medea in 1763.

On the oratorio front, David's Lamentation over Saul and Jonathan on John Lockman's text was performed on 22 February 1740 at the Hickford's Room. That same year, he also composed The Seasons on a poem by James Thomson. Between 1759 and 1768 he directed the annual performances of Messiah at the Foundling Hospital, where he was organist. Paradise Lost, first performed on 29 February 1760, was his greatest success with words by Stillingfleet after John Milton; four later ones, all performed at the Royal Opera House in Covent Garden, were largely reworkings of Handel's music: Rebecca on 4 March 1761 on a text by Stillingfleet, Nabal (16 March 1764), Tobit (1764) and Gideon (10 February 1769), all three on words by Thomas Morell. Information on three other oratorios is scarce: Judith on words by Robert Price, Jehosaphat, and Redemption on words by William Coxe. The latter was discovered at the Bibliothèque Nationale de Paris in 1998.

Among his other works are five volumes of harpsichord music (1732–1763):

- Suites de pièces pour le clavecin, Op. 1 (John Walsh senior, 1732); 6 suites
- Suites de pièces pour le clavecin, Op. 2 (John Walsh senior, 1735); 6 suites
- Six Suits of Lessons for the Harpsicord, Op. 3 (John Walsh junior, 1755)
- A Collection of Lessons for the Harpsicord, Op. 4 (John Walsh junior, 1757)
- XII Sonatas for the Harpsichord, Op. 5 (John Walsh junior, 1765)

a book of hymns (1765), a funeral service (1772) for the dowager Princess of Wales, who was his harpsichord pupil, and two cantatas: Winter, or Daphne on Pope's Fourth Pastoral (1746) and Thamesi, Isi, e Proteo in honor of Frederick, Prince of Wales.
