= Rob Paravonian =

- Born: Rob Paravonian; Waukegan, Illinois
- Notable work: Pachelbel Rant

Comedy career
- Medium: stand up
- Website: robprocks.com

Rob Paravonian is a comedian, best known for his "Pachelbel Rant" which parodies the use of the chord progression from Pachelbel's Canon in many popular songs.

== Music ==
Born in Waukegan, Illinois, son of a first-generation Armenian-American schoolteacher and local politician (his father Haig was mayor of Waukegan from 1989 to 1993), Rob Paravonian has always loved music, learning cello at age six and playing it from grade school through to the Waukegan High School Symphony. At age 10 the Grade School Orchestra went to nationals in Nashville, and at 13 he went to Florida with the High School Chamber Orchestra, before teaching himself guitar and bass in high school.

While attending college at USC in Los Angeles, Paravonian began working as a comedian, performing at wide-open shows in cafes in L.A. After college he studied improvisation and ensemble work at the Second City Training Center in Chicago and became a regular at the Improv. He also began going on the road, playing Midwest clubs and headlining colleges from coast to coast.

After moving to New York, he quickly became a regular at Catch a Rising Star, and has appeared on Comedy Central, VH1, has written cartoon theme songs, written and performed sketch shows and is on his third solo show.

In 2005 he performed for U.S. troops in Afghanistan, which he described as "a great experience."

== Musical stand up ==
Originally a traditional stand up comedian, Paravonian started bringing his guitar with him to pass the time waiting for his set at the open mic clubs in LA, playing comical songs he'd written with the other comics there. They suggested he try some guitar stuff on stage and, since he had played music most of his life he tried it, and found the crowd enjoyed it.

Much of his success comes from word of mouth and via the internet.

== Pachelbel Rant ==
Paravonian's popular YouTube video regarding his hatred toward Johann Pachelbel and Pachelbel's Canon in D major (which he attributes to the fact that he played cello in school, and the cellist's part consists of eight quarter notes played repeatedly: D, A, B, F#, G, D, G, A) has attracted more than 16.1 million viewers, including more than 151,000 favorites. Throughout the course of his rant, he continuously plays the Canon's chord progression on his acoustic guitar.

== Releases ==
=== Studio CD ===
- Living it Down
- American Cheese
- Don't Crowd the Plow
- Songs From the Second Story

=== Live CD ===
- Live on Both Coasts
- Official Bootleg
- Playing for Drunks

=== DVD ===
- 40 Minutes From Chicago
- Rob P. Live
