= Stanley Langshaw =

England international rugby league footballer

Personal information
- Full name: Stanley Langshaw
- Born: 1901 Wigan, Lancashire
- Died: November 1936 (aged 35) Fylde, Lancashire, England

Playing information
- Position: Wing
Club
Years	Team	Pld	T	G	FG	P
≤1925–≥25	Rochdale Hornets
Representative
Years	Team	Pld	T	G	FG	P
1925	England	1	0	0	0	0

Stanley Langshaw (1901–1936) was an English professional rugby league footballer who played in the 1920s. Born in Wigan, he played at representative level for England, and at club level for Rochdale Hornets, as a wing. It was reported in November 1936 that he had died, aged 35, in hospital after a long illness.

== International honours ==
Langshaw won a cap for England while at Rochdale Hornets in 1925 against Wales.
