= St John the Evangelist's Church, Lancaster =

Coordinates: 54.0504°N 2.7990°W

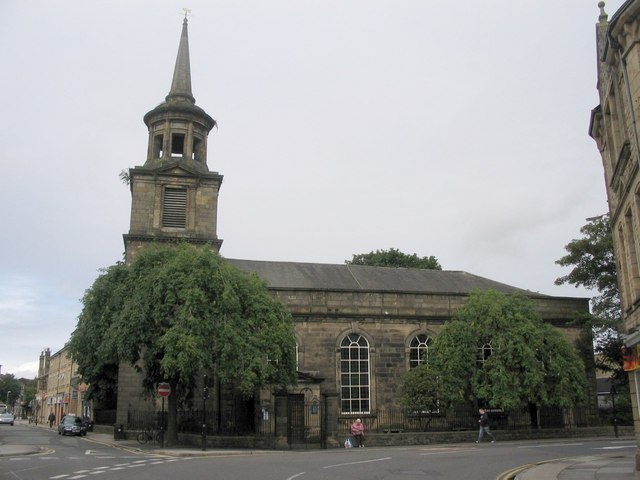
- St John the Evangelist's Church, Lancaster, from the south

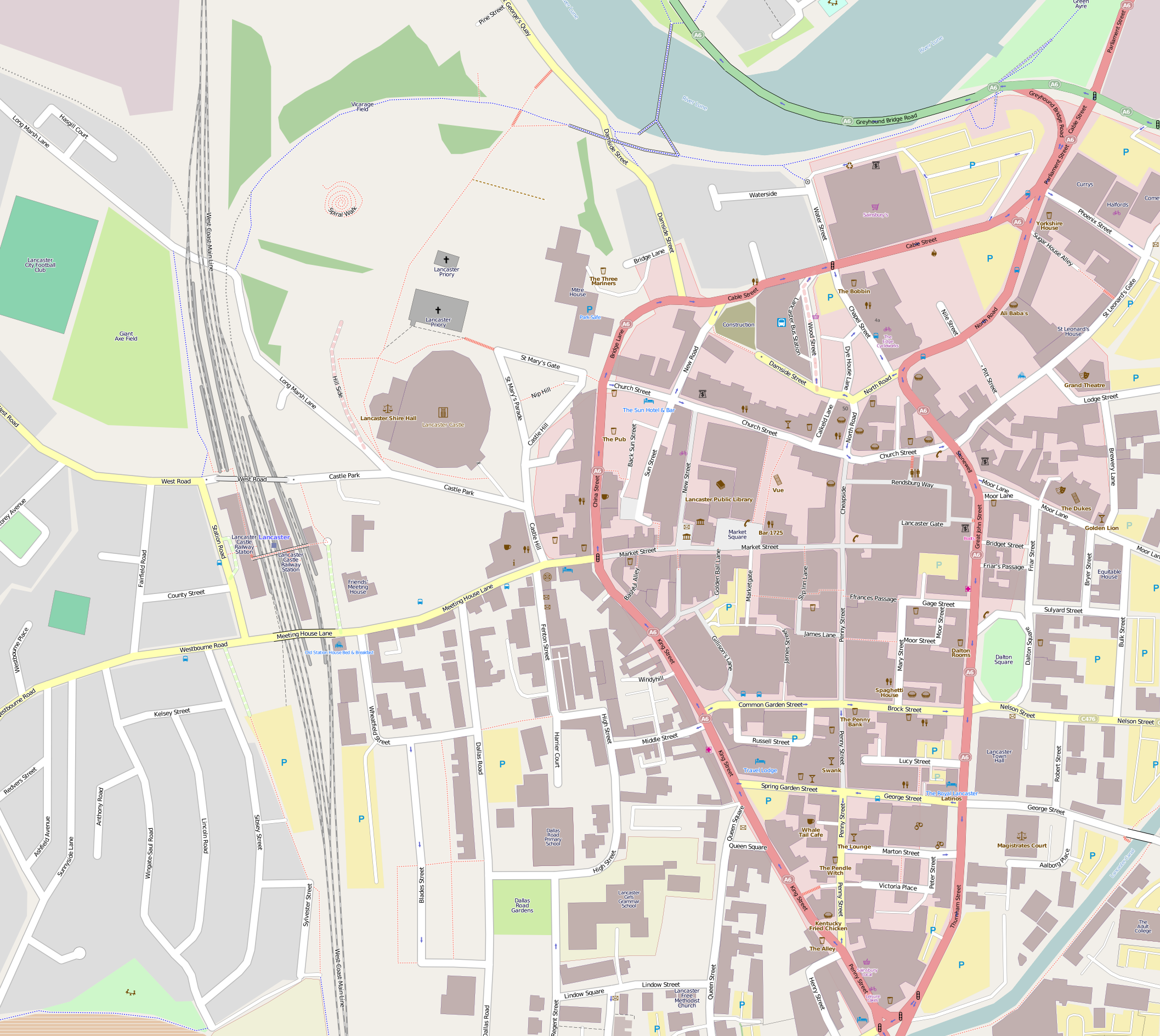
- Location in Lancaster
- OS grid reference: SD 477,619
- Location: North Road, Lancaster, Lancashire
- Country: England
- Denomination: Anglican
- Website: Churches Conservation Trust

History
- Dedication: John the Evangelist

Architecture
- Functional status: Redundant
- Heritage designation: Grade II*
- Designated: 22 December 1953
- Architect(s): Henry Sephton (?); Thomas Harrison (tower and spire)
- Architectural type: Church
- Style: Georgian
- Groundbreaking: 1754
- Completed: 1755

Specifications
- Length: 77 feet (23 m)
- Width: 49 feet (15 m)
- Materials: Sandstone, slate roof

St John the Evangelist's Church is a redundant Anglican church in North Road, Lancaster, Lancashire, England. It is recorded in the National Heritage List for England as a designated Grade II* listed building, and is under the care of the Churches Conservation Trust.

== History ==
The church was built in 1754–55 as a chapel of ease to Lancaster Priory at a time when the town was growing rapidly. It is thought that the architect was Henry Sephton. In 1784 a tower and spire designed by Thomas Harrison were added. This was paid for by a legacy from Thomas Bowes. A south porch was built in 1874. In the 1920s an apse with a chapel to the north and a vestry to the south were added. The interior of the church was restored in 1955 by Sir Albert Richardson. The church closed in 1981, and was vested in the Redundant Churches Fund (the forerunners of the Churches Conservation Trust) in 1983.

== Architecture ==
=== Exterior ===
St John's is constructed in sandstone ashlar with a slate roof. Its plan consists of a five bay nave, a semicircular apse with a north chapel and a south vestry, a south porch and a west tower. The body of the church measures 77 feet (23 m) by 49 feet (15 m). It has projecting quoins and a cornice over which is a parapet. On the sides of the church are tall round-headed windows with keystones. In the west bay on the north side of the church is a blocked doorway. This contains a window, and there is a round-headed window above it. The east bay on the south side has a similar door and windows. The west bay of the south side contains a porch, over which is another round-headed window. In the apse are two curved windows flanked by round-headed windows, and there are similar windows on each side of the tower on the west front.

The tower is in three stages. On its west side is a door, there are lunette windows on the north and south sides, and a rectangular window on the north side. The middle stage has clock faces on three sides. The top stage contains rectangular louvred bell openings. On the top of the tower is a rotunda consisting of rectangular openings and Tuscan columns carrying a curved entablature with a triglyph frieze. On top of this is a drum with a spirelet. The design of the rotunda is said to be based loosely on that of the Choragic Monument of Lysicrates.

=== Interior ===
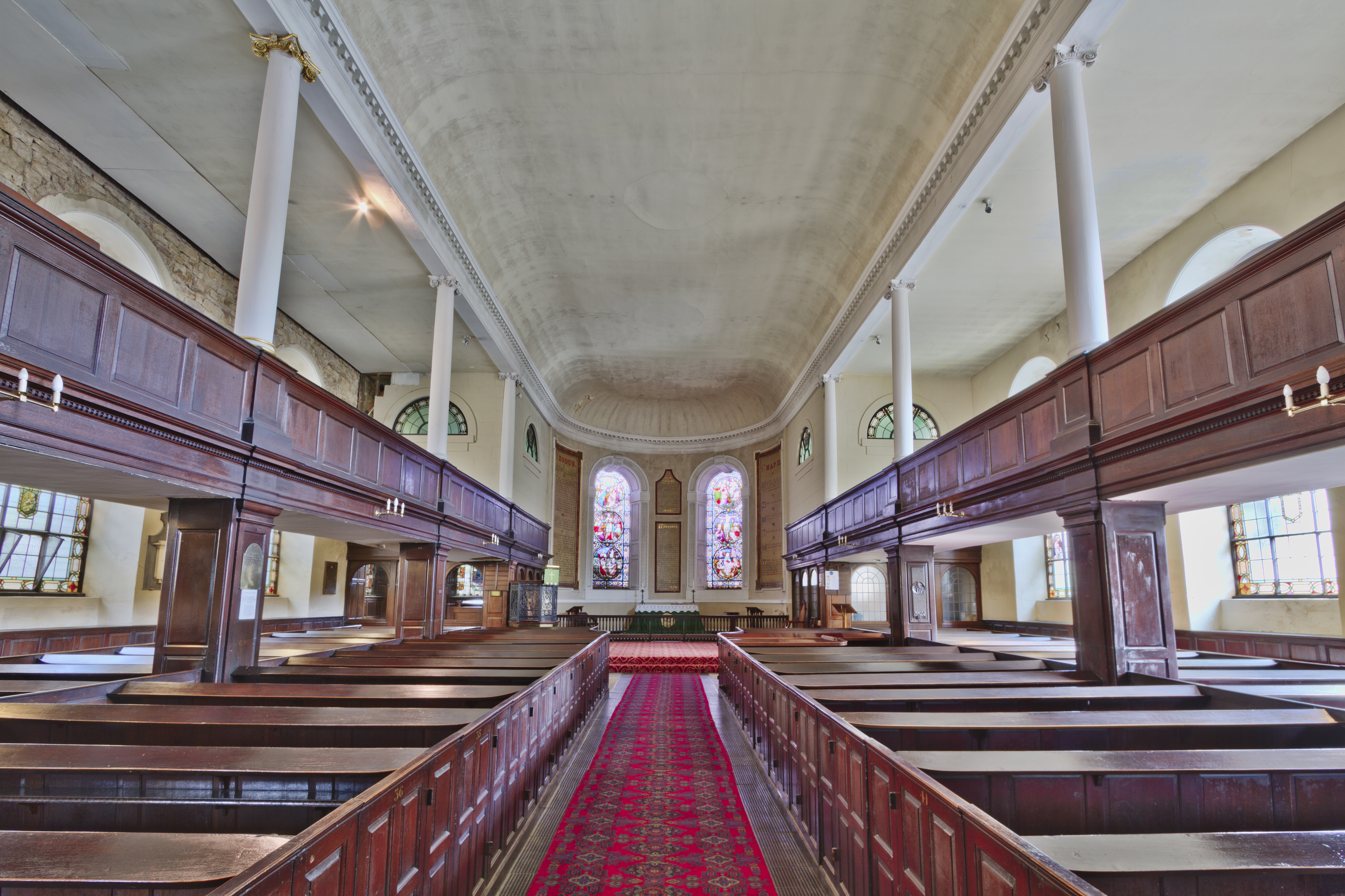
The interior of the church

There are panelled galleries on three sides, with Ionic columns rising from the galleries to the ceiling. The central part of the west gallery is supported by two timber Doric columns. The galleries are reached by two staircases. In the body of the church are oak box pews. On the south side the pews have been modified to form a double pew for the use of the Corporation. The mahogany communion rails have turned balusters. The iron pulpit dates from 1875 and the plain stone font from 1858. The stained glass in the north aisle and the chapel dates from the late 19th or early 20th century and is by Shrigley and Hunt. The stained glass in the apse windows dates from about 1870 and depicts scenes from the life of Christ. The wall of the apse is painted with the Ten Commandments and the Creed.

The organ in the west gallery was given by Abraham Rawlinson MP around the time the tower was built. The organ retains its Adam style case, made of mahogany by Gillow's of Lancaster. However, the three-manual instrument has been rebuilt since it was dedicated in 1785. The case originally housed an organ by Langshaw of Lancaster. It was rebuilt by Brindley & Co of Sheffield in 1868, and again in 1934 by Henry Ainscough of Preston. Further work was carried out by Victor Saville of Carnforth in 1983, restoring the organ's Georgian appearance.

The clock mechanism was made by Bell and Atkinson of Lancaster in 1866, and occupies a glass case in the middle stage of the tower. The tower also contains two bells, one dated 1747 cast by Rudhall of Gloucester, and the other from 1846 by Mears of the Whitechapel Bell Foundry.

== Regeneration ==
In 2020-1, the Architectural Heritage Fund awarded the Churches Conservation Trust two separate project grants to develop ideas for the future of St John's. In partnership with the Lancashire and District Chamber of Commerce, the CCT has developed re-use proposals for the church to function as a co-working space and cafe, with a possible extension in the churchyard. The CCT has commissioned architects Buttress, along with structural and services engineers, quantity surveyors and historians, to make further investigations into the condition and repair liability of the church, as well as the feasibility and costs of the re-use proposals. Business planning and options appraisals are ongoing and volunteers to help with opening the church to the public on a regular basis are being sought.

== See also ==
- Grade II* listed buildings in Lancashire
- Listed buildings in Lancaster, Lancashire
- List of churches preserved by the Churches Conservation Trust in Northern England
- List of works by Thomas Harrison
