= Nabal (Handel) =

Oratorio pastiche musical composition

George Frideric Handel

Nabal (no HWV number) is an oratorio pastiche. It was compiled from the works of Handel in 1764 by John Christopher Smith. It was first performed on 16 March 1764 at Covent Garden, London.

The recitatives are presumably the work of Smith, while the arias are largely borrowed from Handel's operas, oratorios, anthems and cantatas.

== Dramatis Personae ==
- Nabal (bass)
- Abigail (soprano)
- David (tenor)
- Asaph (soprano)
- Shepherd (soprano)

== Summary ==
Part	Movement	Type	Voice	Text (first lines)
1	1	Symphonia (Largo, Allegro, Largo, Minuet)		
1	2	Recitative	David	Here in the Wilderness of Paran
1	3	Chorus		The righteous shall be had in everlasting remembrance
1	4	Accompagnato	David	Have mercy on us, Lord
1	5	Air	David	Food they ask'd
1	6	Recitative	Asaph	No doubt
1	7	Air	Asaph	The Lord, our guide
1	8	Chorus		The Lord our guide
1	9	Recitative	Abigail	How hard the woman's fate
1	10	Air	Abigail	Free from discord
1	11	Recitative	Nabal	Avaunt, unpleasing wretch
1	12	Air	Nabal	Still fill the bowl
1	13	Ballo and Minuet		
1	14	Gavotte		
1	15	Siciliana		
1	16	Air	Shepherd	Gay and light as yonder sheep
1	17	Chorus		Gay and light as yonder sheep
1	18	Recitative	Nabal	'Tis Carmel's annual holiday
1	19	Chorus		Happy, while we reign in pleasure
2	1	Recitative	David	Asaph, 'tis well advis'd
2	2	Air	David	Great Creator
2	3	Chorus		God, who in they heav'nly hand
2	4	Recitative and Accompagnato	Asaph	Thus saith my Lord
2	5	Air	Asaph	Grateful hearts enjoy the blessing
2	6	Recitative	Nabal	Who is this David?
2	7	Air	Nabal	With harps new strung
2	8	Solo and Chorus	Shepherd	Come! Come! Live with pleasure
2	9	Air and Chorus	Shepherd	Sing we the feast
2	10	Chorus		Crown with festal pomp the day
2	11	Accompagnato	Abigail	Thrice happy sheep
2	12	Air	Abigail	Mind eternal
2	13	Recitative	Shepherd, Abigail	Fly my good mistress
2	14	Accompagnato	David	Fell monster!
2	15	Air	David	Fury in all they terrors rise
2	16	Accompagnato	Abigail	On me, my Lord, on me
2	17	Air	Abigail	Mercy, thou heavn'ly cherub
2	18	Accompagnato	David	Blessed be the Lord
2	19	Chorus		All creatures upon God depend
3	1	Interludes		
3	2	Accompagnato	Nabal	Ah! Whence this sudden dread
3	3	Air	Nabal	Oh! Who can tell the terrors?
3	4	Recitative	Shepherd	How soon the scene is chang'd
3	5	Chorus		By slow degrees the wrath of God
3	6	Recitative	Asaph	A messenger, my Lord
3	7	Air	Asaph	When beauty sorrow's livery wears
3	8	Recitative	David	True is your observation
3	9	Air	David	Lovely beauty
3	10	Recitative	Abigail	Behold! Thine handmaid
3	11	Air	Abigail	Come ye similing hours
3	12	Accompagnato	Shepherd	Guardian angels
3	13	Duet	Shepherd, Asaph	Thrice happy pair
3	14	Solo and chorus	Shepherd	Still caressing
3	15	Recitative	Abigail	in praise, to great Jehovah
3	16	Duet	Abigail and David	Thoughts sublime
3	17	Chorus		O glorious prince
