= USS Longshaw =

Fletcher-class destroyer

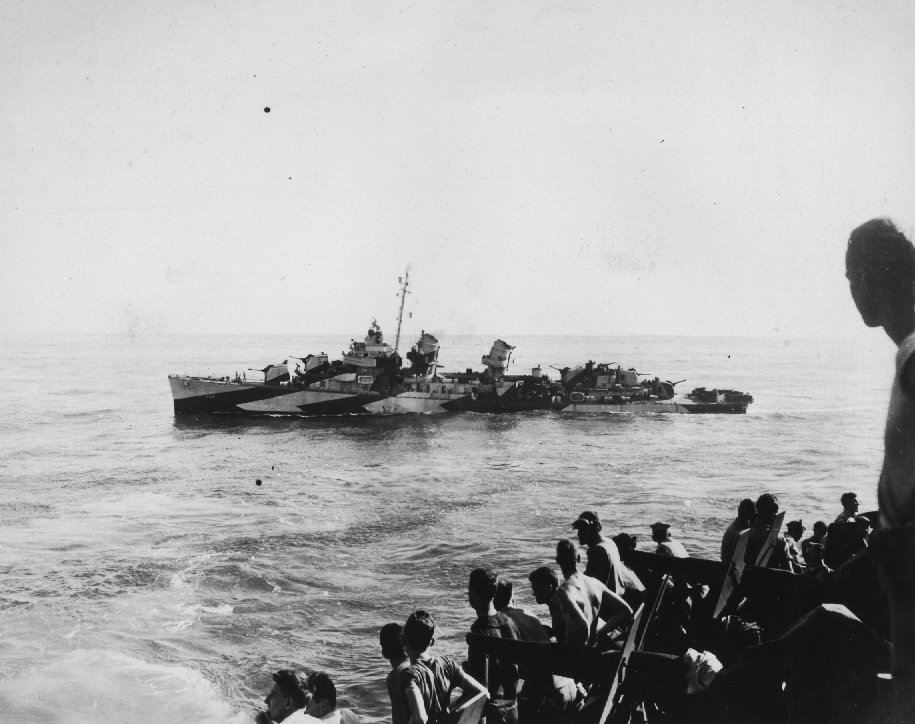
- USS Longshaw (DD-559)

History

United States
- Name: Longshaw
- Namesake: William Longshaw, Jr.
- Builder: Seattle-Tacoma Shipbuilding Corporation
- Laid down: 16 June 1942
- Launched: 4 June 1943
- Commissioned: 4 December 1943
- Fate: Scuttled after running aground and receiving heavy shore fire south of Naha, 18 May 1945

General characteristics
- Class & type: Fletcher-class destroyer
- Displacement: 2,050 long tons (2,080 t)
- Length: 376 ft 6 in (114.7 m)
- Beam: 39 ft 8 in (12.1 m)
- Draft: 17 ft 9 in (5.4 m)
- Propulsion: 60,000 shp (45 MW); 2 propellers
- Speed: 35 knots (65 km/h; 40 mph)
- Range: 6500 nmi (12,000 km) @ 15 kt
- Complement: 273
- Armament: 5 × single Mk 12 5 in (127 mm)/38 guns; 5 × twin 40 mm (1.6 in) Bofors AA guns; 7 × single 20 mm (0.8 in) Oerlikon AA guns; 2 × quintuple 21 in (533 mm) torpedo tubes; 6 × single depth charge throwers; 2 × depth charge racks

USS Longshaw (DD-559), a Fletcher-class destroyer, was a ship of the United States Navy named for Dr. William Longshaw, Jr. (1836–1865), who served in the Navy and was killed during the Civil War.

Longshaw was laid down 16 June 1942 by the Seattle-Tacoma Shipbuilding Corporation, Seattle, Wash.; launched 4 June 1943, sponsored by Mrs. Ella Mae Richards; and commissioned on 4 December 1943. She was lost to shore fire off Naha after grounding on a reef, on 18 May 1945.

== History ==
=== Shakedown; 1943 ===
Longshaw was launched, commissioned, and put to sea (15 December 1943) for tests, training, and shakedown off the west coast. She returned to port (26 January 1944) for post-shakedown availability (repairs).

=== Raids, Hollandia Operation; February–May 1944 ===
Following shakedown off the west coast, Longshaw sailed from San Francisco 18 February 1944, via Pearl Harbor, for the Marshalls arriving Kwajalein 4 March. Assigned to the 5th Fleet, the destroyer got underway for Majuro 15 March, where she then conducted a patrol off Wotje and Maloelap Islands until the 21st. The ship stood out from Majuro the next day, screening the replenishment group for the Fast Carrier Task Force (Task Force 38/58) during strikes on Palau, Yap, Ulithi, and Woleai, 30 March and 1 April, returning to Majuro on the 6th. Six days later, she sailed again, steaming via Manus for Hollandia, escorting the same task group as planes from the flattops pounded the New Guinea coast to support landings by General Douglas MacArthur's troops. Longshaw return to Pearl Harbor 9 May for minor repairs and training.

=== Marianas Operation, Tinian; May–August 1944 ===
Getting underway for the Marianas on 30 May, escorting part of the northern attack force, the destroyer arrived off Saipan 15 June. For the next two months, except for a brief voyage to Eniwetok, she remained there, screening the escort carriers providing air support for the invasion and also operating as a rescue ship for downed aviators. Sailing to Eniwetok on 22 August, Longshaw departed on the 29th to guard the carriers of Task Group 38.3 (TG 38.3) during strikes against targets on Palau, Mindanao, and Luzon in support of the assault on the Palaus, the steppingstone to the Philippines.

=== Western Caroline Islands Operation; September–October 1944 ===
On 9 September, in company with other ships of her task group, the destroyer attacked a convoy of Japanese luggers off Mindanao, herself destroying three small coastal vessels. She continued to support carrier operations against Japanese in the Philippines until proceeding to Ulithi on 2 October.

=== Leyte Operation; October–December 1944 ===
Longshaw sortied with TG 38.3, 6 October for intensified airstrikes in preparation for the Philippines invasion. Planes from the carriers hit airfields on Okinawa, Luzon, and Formosa, 10 to 13 October. Longshaw, in the screen, shot down one Japanese torpedo bomber during the furious Formosa air battle on the 12th. The fast carriers continued their operations in support of the invasion of Leyte, hitting the Philippines airfields steadily until the night of 24 October, when the mighty armada turned northward to engage the Japanese northern force the next day in the Battle off Cape Engaño. In a series of crushing airstrikes, American naval aircraft sank the remnants of Japan's carrier force.

Based at Ulithi, Longshaw operated with TG 38.3 through the end of the year, screening the carriers in airstrikes at enemy bases on Okinawa, Formosa, and Luzon, helping to clear the way for the invasion of the latter island in January.

=== Luzon Operation; January 1945 ===
On the night of 9–10 January 1945, the destroyer accompanied the fast carriers through Bashi Channel between the Philippines and Formosa, entering the South China Sea. For the next 10 days, TF 38 operated unchecked, launching attacks at Japanese installations in French Indochina, Formosa, and the China coast, including Hong Kong and Hainan. After returning through Balintang Channel, the flattops pounded Okinawa once more, 22 January, before retiring to Ulithi on the 26th.

=== Iwo Jima, Okinawa; February–May 1945 ===
Longshaw departed Ulithi 10 February with a night-fighter direction team on board. Sailing with the fast carrier force, she served as a fighter-direction and radar picket vessel during the airstrikes on Tokyo, 17 to 18 February; and, for the remainder of the month, escorted TG 58.5, the night carrier group in actions off Iwo Jima. Returning to Ulithi 12 March, the destroyer joined Task Force 54 (TF 54), which stood out for Okinawa on the 21st, escorting the support and bombardment unit for the invasion. Arriving 25 March, the ship shelled enemy targets ashore in support of American troops. Serving in this capacity throughout April and into May, the ship's crew performed magnificently. On call for naval gunfire support day or night, Longshaw remained continuously on station supplying her much needed firepower, despite steady attacks by Japanese suicide planes.

== Fate ==
On the morning of 18 May 1945, following a four-day period of fire support, Longshaw, en route to her patrol area, ran aground on a coral reef just south of Naha airfield, at 0719. Other attempts to free her failing, tug Arikara (ATF-98) arrived at 0945. At 1000, tug's skipper, Lieutenant John Aikin, and Radioman First Class James J Zikus, boarded to arrange recovery and communications. Towing commenced at 1100. At 1101, Japanese shore batteries opened up, hitting the water between Arikara and Longshaw. The stranded destroyer attempted to fight back as best she could; but, as she opened fire, her bow was completely blown off by a hit in the forward magazine. When efforts to save her appeared hopeless, the order "Abandon Ship" was relayed by word of mouth from the bridge. At 1105, all hands on the bridge were killed, injured, or stunned; the Longshaw's skipper, Lieutenant Commander Clarence William Becker, was reportedly there, mortally wounded, along with Radioman Zikus of the Arikara. At 1115, the abandon ship order reached the aft fire room and engine room.

About 1200, LCI(L)-356 came alongside to remove all wounded. The ship was burning, shells were exploding in their magazines, and the decks were hot enough to cause burns; many in the rescue party were awarded medals.

The casualties included 86 dead or missing, including the skipper. (The missing were later declared dead.) In addition to the dead and missing, 95 crew members were wounded, and 113 crew members survived the sinking. The November 1, 1981 issue of Esquire includes the article "My Father Probably Wasn't a Hero" by Craig Vetter. Vetter's father, Lt. Robert Simmons, was killed when an exploding shell blew him off the fantail of the Longshaw. Vetter, who was only three when his father was killed, writes, "They finally found what was left of Robert washed up on Okinawa, on a beach not far from a hill called Sugar Loaf, which they had been trying to take."

Later in the afternoon, Longshaw, battered beyond salvaging, was destroyed by gunfire and torpedoes from U.S. ships.

== Honors ==
Longshaw received nine battle stars for World War II service.

List of battle stars:

- Asiatic-Pacific Raids
- Hollandia Operation
- Marianas Operation
- Tinian Capture and Occupation
- Western Caroline Islands Operation
- Leyte Operation
- Luzon Operation
- Iwo Jima Operation
- Okinawa Gunto Operation
