= William Longshaw Jr. =

United States Navy officer

Doctor William Longshaw Jr.
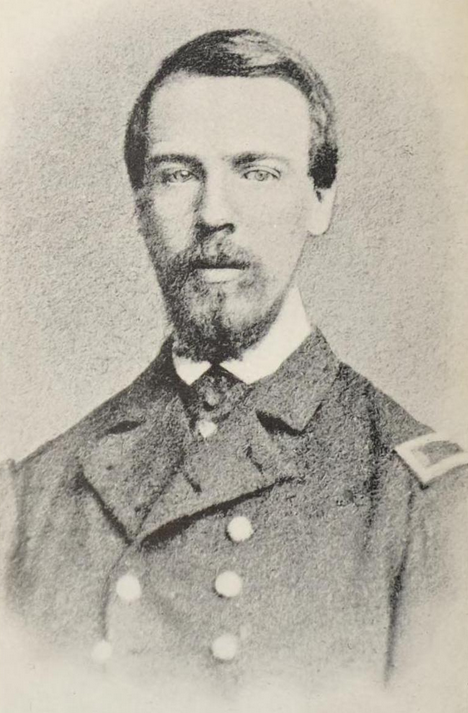
- Born: April 26, 1836; Manchester, England
- Died: January 15, 1865 (aged 25); Fort Fisher, North Carolina
- Burial place: Woodlawn Cemetery, Everett, Massachusetts
- Alma mater: Phillips Academy; University of Michigan (M.D.)
- Military career
- Branch: Union Navy
- Service years: 1862 – 1865
- Rank: Acting Assistant Surgeon
- Conflicts: First Battle of Charleston Harbor; Second Battle of Charleston Harbor; Second Battle of Fort Fisher †
- Memorials: USS Longshaw (DD-559)

William Longshaw Jr. (April 26, 1836 – January 15, 1865) was a medical doctor who volunteered for service in the United States Navy during the American Civil War. Longshaw obtained medical and pharmacy training in Boston, New York City, and New Orleans, receiving his medical degree from the University of Michigan. He was appointed acting assistant surgeon by the navy in 1862, serving aboard USS Yankee, Passaic, Penobscot, Lehigh, and finally his squadron's flagship Minnesota.

On several occasions Longshaw's gallantry and courageous actions under direct enemy fire were mentioned in reports by flag-level superiors John Dahlgren and David Dixon Porter and the Secretary of the Navy Gideon Wells. Supporting the navy's amphibious landing in the Second Battle of Fort Fisher on January 15, 1865, Longshaw went onshore with the landing party and was active in tending to numerous wounded and dying during the assault. After rescuing an unconscious sailor in danger of drowning from the rising tide, Longshaw responded to the cry of a wounded marine and while treating him was shot in the head and died instantly.

After a 1913 plea for recognition by United States Navy medical director James Duncan Gatewood, in 1943 the navy commissioned a Fletcher-class destroyer Longshaw named in honor of the assistant surgeon. That vessel was lost to shore battery fire in the Battle of Okinawa and received nine battle stars for its World War II service.

== Early life and training ==
William Longshaw was born in Manchester, England, in April 1836, (Note: Sources differ as to birthplace and birth date. The online edition of Dictionary of American Naval Fighting Ships, in its entry for USS Longshaw gives a birth date of April 1839 and a birth location as Manchester, England. A print version of the same publication, dating from 1969, gives "near, Richmond, Va...." James Gatewood, in his 1913 biographical sketch (also published by the U.S. Navy) gives a birthplace as Manchester Virginia and a date of 1839. Longshaw's headstone in Everett, Massachustetts seems to indicate a 1836 birth year, but is unclear about birth location.) the eldest of two sons to William and Margaret (née Davies) Longshaw who had emigrated to the United States from England shortly after marriage. The family traveled to Kentucky for a time then settled in Cambridge, Massachusetts; (Note: The Boston city directory of 1866 lists William and L.M. Longshaw as druggists in East Cambridge) William's younger brother Luther M. (July 31, 1844 – May 27, 1921) was born in Lowell. William appears to have attended Lyman school and the English High School, completing his studies at Phillips Academy.

Longshaw studied medicine with an East Cambridge physician for a year, then moved to New York where he attended lectures at University of the City of New York (now New York University) under Valentine Mott and Thomas C. Finnell. Returning to East Boston in 1857, he joined the Maverick Congregational Church. At the age of 18, Longshaw traveled to New Orleans, working as a pharmacy clerk while attending lectures in pharmacology at the University of Louisiana (now Tulane). He was sufficiently accomplished as a pharmacist to become a member of the American Pharmaceutical Association, listing Bayou Sara, Louisiana, as home in 1858.

While still in New Orleans, Longshaw assisted the local medical community in combating a summer Yellow fever epidemic. After further study at University of Michigan Medical School Longshaw received his medical degree in 1859. His handwritten graduation thesis, still in the Michigan Historical Collections, is entitled "The Physiology of Fecundation". As a student, Longshaw was a clinical assistant to the professor of surgery; he was also granted "a special degree in chemistry, both qualitative and quantitative analysis." After obtaining his degree, Longshaw gained experience taking "charge of four wards of an Army hospital." On July 10, 1860, Longshaw embarked as surgeon of the polar expedition led by Isaac Israel Hayes which wintered that year on Ellesmere Island; Longshaw himself returned in November 1860, reporting temporary snow blindness. He reported that he and another crewman had witnessed the Solar eclipse of July 18, 1860.

== Naval service ==
=== USS Yankee ===
Entering the Navy as an acting assistant surgeon June 25, 1862, Longshaw was described as a slim, fair-skinned fellow of average height with dark hair and gray eyes. Longshaw was assigned to USS Yankee, an armed paddle wheel tugboat which had seen action in Charleston Harbor, the evacuation of the Norfolk Naval Yard, and in the Potomac River basin. While Longshaw was in service on Yankee, the little gunboat served on the James River flotilla, supporting McClellan's Peninsula campaign. In July, Longshaw participated in a nighttime raid that captured two ships without firing a shot. In August 1862 Yankee returned to the Potomac to guard approaches to the nation's capitol.

On August 14, Longshaw reported to the Philadelphia Naval Asylum for board examinations. (Note: For comparison, between 1861 and 1865, only 164 out of the 338 applicants eventually passed.) Passing the Naval Medical Board examinations required not only a thorough medical knowledge of fields such as chemistry, anatomy, physiology, obstetrics and "principles and practice of surgery", but also a test of the candidate's "mental, moral and physical qualifications" necessary for arduous sea duty. Longshaw passed with 595 out of a possible 780 (76.2%) in about three days of testing. Still only an acting assistant surgeon, Longshaw returned to Yankee, serving until mid-October.

=== Boston Navy Yard ===
Longshaw was finally appointed assistant surgeon in November 1862 and was transferred to the receiving ship USS Ohio at Boston Harbor, waiting orders and assignment to his next vessel. (Note: In the day, men who had surpassed the qualifications for promotion often were required to await rare vacancies made available by promotion, retirement, or death of a previous rank-holder.) Until March, Longshaw served as a medical officer of the Boston Navy Yard, where he would perform physical inspections of new recruits, returning sailors and officers, as well as treating injuries and illnesses of those in his charge. Ohio was a retired ship of the line, now in ordinary, designed for a crew of several hundred men, now serving as a barracks and hospital for the navy yard. After six years of medical training, Longshaw was stationed within a short hike from his parents' home in Cambridge.

Aboard such a training vessel, Longshaw learned to spend his day writing and filing reports on individual cases, logging traffic through the sick bay, keeping inventory of equipment and supplies, making requests for medications, taking environmental readings, inspecting various locations about the ship for sanitary conditions, coordinating with the ship's galley to insure sufficient nourishment, in addition to dealing with the daily medical needs of the crew. An assistant surgeon would also train new sailors in basic first aid, teaching them how to apply tourniquets and bandages, then how to load, lift and carry wounded comrades on stretchers. Longshaw would be responsible for managing medical and other hospital staff like nurses, cooks, and stewards. Five months aboard Ohio provided Longshaw his naval "residency."

=== USS Passaic ===
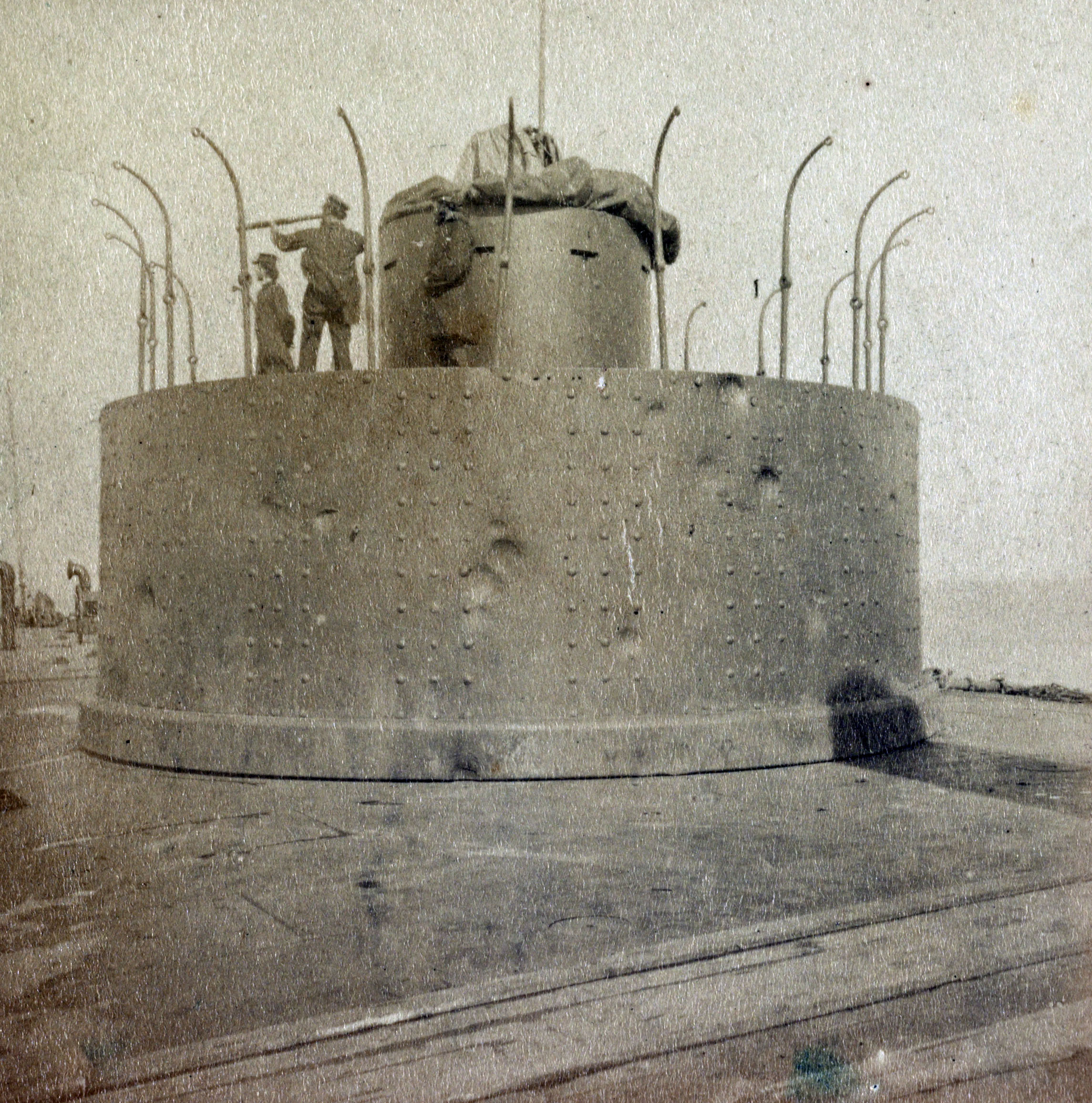
Turret of USS Passaic after the April 1863 bombardment in the First Battle of Charleston Harbor

In March 1863, Longshaw was assigned to the South Atlantic Blockading Squadron under Samuel Francis Du Pont in Charleston Harbor. Longshaw's new vessel was USS Passaic, much like her predecessor USS Monitor, a shallow-draft, low-profile ironclad with a single raised turret in the center of the deck. Passaic was under the command of Captain Percival Drayton, a native of Charleston, and while newly commissioned and modern, Passaic was vulnerable to poor weather and rough seas. (Note: Passaic and Monitor were both towed around Cape Hatteras on the same stormy New Year's Eve 1862; Passaic raised Beaufort, North Carolina, on January 1, 1863, but mere miles away, Monitor had foundered and sunk along with 16 of her crew) Her 85 sailors and officers were confined in her iron hull most of each day, cramped together and half-smothered by heat, smoke and foul air. In early April, Passaic and much of her squadron's ironclads attacked forts in Charleston Harbor. The ships were pounded by shot and shell. In a few hours, Passaic fired 13 shells and was struck 35 times, shots disabling one of its two guns, jamming its turret for a time and virtually ripping off the pilot-house atop the turret. However, Passaic reported no casualties; only one death was recorded in the nine ironclads that day.

=== USS Penobscot ===
Longshaw was transferred in May 1863 to USS Penobscot, a two-masted single-screw schooner tasked with chasing and capturing blockade runners. After months practicing medicine in a cramped, iron-hulled vessel with no windows, sunny Penobscot would have been a welcome change. In July, she ran an English-built Kate aground on Smith's Island; a boat party attempted to disable the vessel and actually set the blockade runner afire.

=== USS Lehigh ===
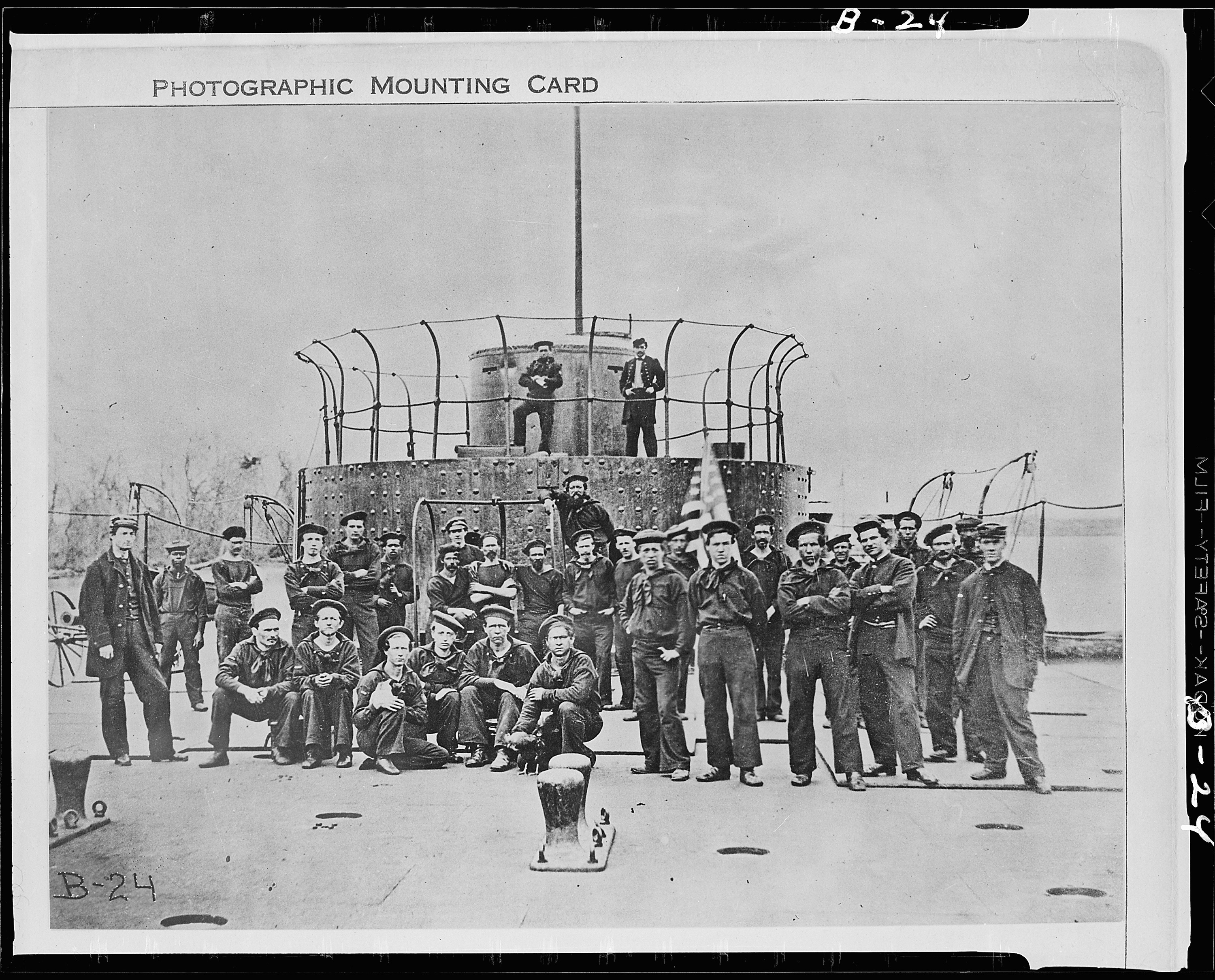
USS "Lehigh" on the James River, showing dents in the monitor's turret armor made by Confederate cannon (U.S. National Archives)

On August 11, Longshaw was ordered to return to ironclad service on the newly built monitor USS Lehigh, a sister ship of Passaic, under the command of Commander Andrew Bryson. Lehigh was immediately engaged in active operations in Charleston Harbor, attacking Fort Sumter regularly for the next few months. In an engagement with Confederate batteries on Sullivan's Island, Charleston, South Carolina, November 16, 1863, Lehigh grounded itself while shelling Confederate forts in the harbor; a tow hawser had to be passed to steamer USS Nahant, which was standing by. Longshaw, under direct enemy fire in an open boat, twice carried a line for the hawser across to Nahant. The Confederate fire was so intense that both hawsers were shot away. Longshaw was unable to make the third trip; by then he had wounded to attend. Lehigh was eventually refloated when Nahant pulled her free with the third hawser.

Longshaw's gallantry in this action was praised by eyewitness Rear Admiral John A. Dahlgren. Wrote Dahlgren: "Twice he passed in a small boat from the Lehigh to the Nahant, carrying a line bent on the hawser. The shot and shell from cannon and mortars were flying and breaking all around." Dalhgren reported he'd promoted the enlisted men involved. "I shall also make honorable mention of them to the honorable Secretary of the Navy, which is all I can do for Dr. Longshaw. It is not in my power to reward him suitably." Five seaman were promoted and eventually awarded the Medal of Honor for the action. Longshaw's status as medical officer prevented Dahlgren from offering him a field promotion. However, the navy's chief of the Bureau of Medicine and Surgery sent his recommendation to Secretary of the Navy Gideon Welles who did promote Longshaw, pending board examinations and completion of two years' service.

=== USS Minnesota ===
Longshaw was transferred to Rear Admiral Samuel Phillips Lee's North Atlantic Blockading fleet on December 30, 1863, and was assigned to the squadron flagship Minnesota, Lieutenant Commander John H. Upshur commanding. Longshaw's new assignment was prestigious; he would serve under the fleet surgeon with three other assistant surgeons aboard. With ship's officers and enlisted men numbering almost 700, Minnesota was massive, well-equipped, and "one of the great frigates of her day... Such ships were the best habitations afloat..."

Assisting the fleet surgeon involved facilitating the vast flow of reports, logs, inventories, requests, and receipts from each vessel in the fleet. Longshaw and the other assistant surgeons aboard accumulated data for constant communication with the Bureau of Medicine and Surgery in the Department of the Navy. Longshaw stood watches as officer of the day supervising the sick bay, diagnosing and treating injuries and illnesses as they arose.

==== Fort Fisher ====
By the end of 1864, Wilmington, North Carolina, was one of the few ports still available for blockade runners attempting to supply the Confederacy. Shoal waters prevented larger ships from entering Cape Fear River, and the Confederates had built a substantial series of fortifications on what was then known as Federal Point. The largest of these was Fort Fisher. Facing the sea was a twelve-foot high structure one mile long, with raised batteries at each end; facing the northern land approach was a taller structure with fifteen mounds 32 feet high, an underground network of tunnels, and a stake fence nine feet high in front of the walls. The structure's sturdy earthen construction rendered much of the fort impervious to naval artillery bombardment. A garrison of 2400 soldiers, good supply lines, and strong artillery positions made the fort difficult to assault by land.

In late December, a land attack on the fort failed, causing the removal of the Union forces' commander. Another more coordinated assault was planned for January. The fort was to face massive bombardment from the sea, followed by a land assault from the north, timed to coincide with amphibious landing by 400 marines and 1600 sailors from the northeast. For the naval assault Minnesota would supply 51 marines, 189 sailors and officers, and Longshaw. Marines were armed with rifles; sailors with cutlass and pistols. Longshaw carried his medical bag.

The naval assault bogged down; the fort's walls were out of range of the sailors' pistols. Hundreds of marines and sailors were killed or wounded. One officer reported of Longshaw, "he was always near the front with instruments and tourniquets...". Another officer reported of "his great bravery and attention to the wounded under the hottest fire...". Thomas O. Selfridge, later recorded:

While kept under the walls of the fort, I was an eyewitness to an act of heroism on the part of Asst. Surg. William Longshaw, a young officer of the medical staff, whose memory should ever be kept green by his corps, and which deserves more than this passing notice. A sailor, too severely wounded to help himself, had fallen close to the water's edge and with the rising tide would have drowned. Dr. Longshaw, at the peril of his life, went to his assistance and dragged him beyond the incoming tide. At this moment he heard a cry from a wounded marine, one of a small group who, behind a little hillock of sand close to the parapet, kept up a fire upon the enemy. Longshaw ran to his assistance and while attending to his wounds was shot dead. What made the action of this young officer even more heroic was that on the very day he had received a leave of absence, but had postponed his departure to volunteer for the assault."

The next day, North Atlantic Blockading Squadron commanding officer Rear Admiral David D. Porter ordered USS Fort Jackson to pick up Dr. Longshaw's body from Minnesota and to deliver it to the naval hospital at Gosport Navy Yard "without delay."

== Legacy ==
Dr. William Longshaw Jr. was buried in the Woodlawn Cemetery in Everett, Massachusetts. In 1943, the destroyer Longshaw was named in his honor.
