= William Cockin =

English schoolmaster and versatile author

- Born: 1736; Burton-in-Kendal, England, United Kingdom
- Died: 30 May 1801 (aged 65); Burton-in-Kendal, England, Kingdom of Great Britain
- Occupations: Schoolteacher, writer, accountant

William Cockin (baptised 1736 – 1801) was an English schoolmaster and versatile author.

== Life ==
The son of Marmaduke Cockin (1712–1754), he was born at Burton-in-Kendal, Westmorland. His father was a schoolmaster.

After time spent as a teacher in schools in London, Cockin was in 1764 appointed writing-master and accountant to Lancaster Grammar School, a post he held for twenty years. He was then for eight years at John Blanchard's Nottingham Academy.

Cockin retired to Kendal. He was a friend of George Romney the painter, and he died at Romney's house in Kendal, on 30 May 1801, aged 65. He was buried at Burton-in-Kendal.

== Associations ==
Among Cockin's friends was the Rev. Thomas Wilson of Clitheroe, and Peter Romney, brother of George, was a correspondent in the later 1760s. Other associates were John Dawson, and Rev. John James D.D., of Arthuret.

== Works ==
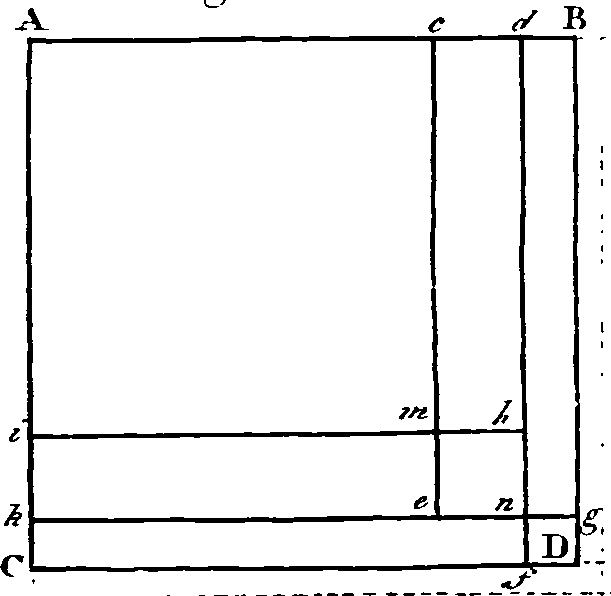
Diagram from A Rational and Practical Treatise of Arithmetic (1766) by William Cockin

Cockin's works included:

- A Rational and Practical Treatise of Arithmetic, 1766.
- Occasional Attempts in Verse, privately printed at Kendal.
- Ode to the Genius of the Lakes, 1780.
- The Theory of the Syphon, 1781.
- The Fall of Scepticism and Infidelity predicted, 1788, in the form of a letter to James Beattie.
- The Freedom of Human Action explained, 1791
- The Rural Sabbath, a poem, 1805. This posthumous volume includes a reprint of the Ode to the Lakes, with biographical notes.

Cockin contributed to the Philosophical Transactions a paper An Account of an Extraordinary Appearance in a Mist near Lancaster.

=== Elocutionist ===
In 1775 Cockin published The Art of Delivering Written Language; or, An Essay on Reading, dedicated to David Garrick, a work on elocution. In this book Cockin is representative of the 18th-century elocutionary movement, and within elocutionist he is assigned to the "natural school". His comment on the prescriptive approach of Thomas Sheridan, a leader of the movement, was that works of elocution might be as much about perceptions of ways of talking as speaking.

Cockin noted in particular the connection between modulation in speech and silent reading. He pointed out that in both speech and singing, pauses are used to frame and for emphasis. He took comical mimicry to be a low form, in terms of artistic prestige. His exposition on the topic is now a standard authority for this attitude to imitation and mimesis.

=== Guide books ===
Thomas West's Guide to the Lakes, on the English Lake District, first appeared in 1778, and Cockin assisted in its compilation. He edited, anonymously, the second edition in 1780, West having died in 1779, including a preface that discussed the sources used: John Brown's Letter on Keswick, Thomas Gray, Thomas Pennant and Arthur Young. This expanded work and a later edition influenced William Wordsworth's 1810 guide. They contained the Letter on Keswick and Gray's Journal of the Lakes as appendices. Other additions included an engraving of Grasmere, after John Feary; Cockin was also responsible for footnotes, and tables of heights of the mountains.
