= Kevin MacLeod =

American composer (born 1972)

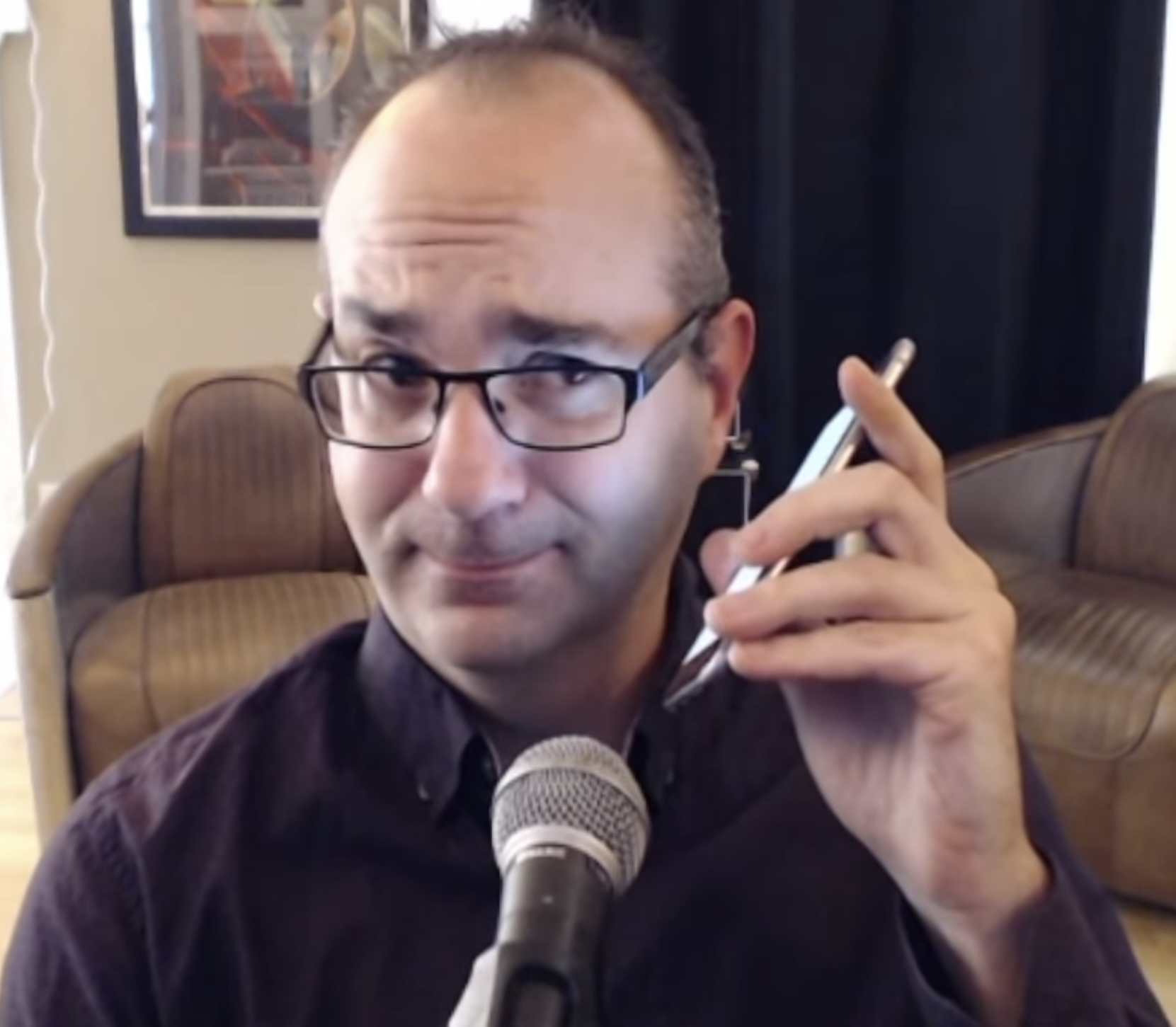
- MacLeod in 2016

Background information
- Born: 1972 (age 53–54); Green Bay, Wisconsin, US
- Genres: Library music; film music; video game music
- Occupations: Composer; music producer
- Website: incompetech.com
- Kevin MacLeod's voice Recorded in 2023

Kevin MacLeod (/məˈklaʊd/ mə-KLOWD; born 1972) is an American composer and music producer. Described by The New York Times as "arguably the most prolific composer you've never heard of", MacLeod has composed over 2,000 pieces of royalty-free library music and made them available under a Creative Commons (CC BY) copyright license. Two of his compositions, "Monkeys Spinning Monkeys" and "Electrodoodle", are among the most played on TikTok; from January 2021 through September 2026, they were played over 151.8 billion times.

The wide availability and freeness of his work have made it featured in thousands of films and millions of videos on YouTube. As of 2017, his music is featured on one of the live feeds from the International Space Station, Earth From Space. A documentary charting his career, Royalty Free: The Music of Kevin MacLeod, was released in 2020.

== Early life and education ==
Kevin MacLeod was born in Green Bay, Wisconsin, in 1972. He began piano lessons at a young age: "as a 4-year old or whatever it was." He attended university where he initially studied electrical engineering; however, amid a distaste for chemistry requirements, he switched to music education after his first month. He never graduated. He grew up with two brothers, Michael Marin and David Marin.

MacLeod had a brief stint as a computer programmer during the dot-com bubble. He had colleagues in the multimedia world struggling to find music, so he began composing and sharing his works online, particularly on YouTube. During this time, he created his website, Incompetech, (Note: Alternatively known as incompetech or Incompetech.com) which initially generated ad revenue from a PDF generator of graph paper.

== Career ==
MacLeod is a composer and music producer, who often posts royalty-free music on his website Incompetech. His music is free to use but requires formal credit, per the Creative Commons Attribution copyright license. Instead of crediting him, parties can pay a fee for a no-attribution license, which starts at $30 for one song, $50 for two songs, and $20 per song for three or more songs. MacLeod receives some advertising revenue from music streaming services but "otherwise relies on donations via Patreon." On his website's FAQ, he expressed disdain for the current state of copyright; he hopes to create "an alternate body of works that is able to compete with them." (Note: MacLeod, "FAQ" § Philosophy) In September 2011, MacLeod became able to assign ISRC codes for his music.

"Monkeys Spinning Monkeys"
MacLeod describes "Monkeys" as a "loopable happy light fluffy piece with bright flutes and a bunch of pizzicato strings."

The wide availability of his music has led to it being used in thousands of films and millions of videos on YouTube and other social media sites. As of 2017, his music is featured on one of the live feeds from the International Space Station, Earth From Space. The media that featured his music varies much, from Martin Scorsese's 2011 film Hugo to pornographic films. One of his songs, "Monkeys Spinning Monkeys", released on February 3, 2014, is among the most played on TikTok; from January through June 2021, it was played over 31.6 billion times. When Will Ferrell and Kristen Wiig presented an award at the 2024 Golden Globes, their use of MacLeod's 2010 song "Fluffing a Duck" was widely noted and gave him considerable attention.

MacLeod released his first album, Piano Music, in 1998.

== Artistry and legacy ==
"Fluffing a Duck"
"A trombone plays a humorous melody alongside timpanis and a variety of woodwind instruments. This music is suited for a short theme for a comedic piece that relies on visual jokes," notes MacLeod.

Since 2020, MacLeod has used artificial intelligence, especially Suno AI, to produce music. MacLeod does not publish any music created using Suno to Incompetech, music stores, or streaming services.

The film critic Neely Swanson writes of MacLeod's music, "There was always a familiar quality to it. His music summons up a mood or feeling that's instantly recognizable. There is nothing new, just something that will already be satisfying."

MacLeod has been labelled as "arguably the most prolific composer you've never heard of – although it's very likely you've heard his music" by Glenn Kenny of The New York Times. Kenny further describes him as "a pioneer both of digital production and distribution," while the critic Justin Curto notes that he is "a bit of a legend in the space [of royalty music]."

MacLeod's work has been detailed in Ryan Camarda's 2020 documentary Royalty Free: The Music of Kevin MacLeod.

=== Awards and accolades ===
In 2015, the European Web Video Academy awarded MacLeod the International Honorary Web Video Award at the 2015 German Web Video Awards for his lifetime achievement in influencing the German web video community.

== Bibliography ==
=== Books and academic sources ===
- Durand, Júlia (2023). "Library Music as the Soundtrack of Youtube". In Rogers, Holly; Freitas, Joana; Porfírio, João Francisco (eds.). Remediating Sound: Repeatable Culture, YouTube and Music. London, England: Bloomsbury Publishing. pp. 211–219. ISBN 978-1-5013-8734-0.
- Mitchell, Ben (2023). Independent Animation: Developing, Producing and Distributing Your Animated Films. Boca Raton, Florida: CRC Press. pp. 391–392. ISBN 978-1-000-84918-9.
- Seymour, Thomas E. (2021). Kevin MacLeod Documentary (Master of Fine Arts thesis). New York City, New York: CUNY Academic Works.

=== News and web sources ===
- Curto, Justin (January 11, 2024). "The Composer Behind the Globes' Best Bit Was Already in Bed". Vulture. Archived from the original on June 2, 2025.
- Duenas, Ulises (December 16, 2020). "'Royalty Free' Tells the Story of the Most Selfless Man in Music". Highbrow Magazine. Archived from the original on October 18, 2025.
- Frank, Jason P. (January 7, 2024). "Kristen Wiig and Will Ferrell Went and Fluffed the Duck". Vulture. Archived from the original on September 15, 2025.
- Gutelle, Sam (December 2, 2016). "Kevin MacLeod Is The King Of Royalty-Free Music, And Millions Are Listening". Tubefilter. Archived from the original on October 18, 2025.
- Kenny, Glenn (March 29, 2022). "'Royalty Free: The Music of Kevin MacLeod' Review: Into the Spotlight". The New York Times. Archived from the original on June 8, 2024.
- Lanier, Hunter (November 4, 2020). "Royalty Free: The Music of Kevin MacLeod". Film Threat. Archived from the original on May 12, 2025.
- Lawrence, Beatrice (July 24, 2024). "A Wisconsin composer's work is all over the internet. Why? He gives it away for free". WPR. Archived from the original on October 7, 2025.
- "David Marin obituary". Legacy.com. Green Bay Press-Gazette. 2015. Archived from the original on January 6, 2026.
- McGreehan, Mike (June 24, 2015). "Piedmont: PHS students excel in global contest with video". Marin Independent Journal. Archived from the original on October 18, 2025.
- Peirson-Hagger, Ellen (April 29, 2021). "How composer Kevin MacLeod became the king of royalty-free music". New Statesman. Archived from the original on July 19, 2025.
- Prichep, Deena (September 23, 2024). "A decade-old wordless song shows how music and social media are shaping each other". NPR. Archived from the original on June 13, 2025.
- Prichep, Deena (September 25, 2024). "How a catchy tune became the soundtrack to TikTok's silliest videos". NPR. Archived from the original on September 27, 2025.
- Spacek, Nick (December 2, 2020). "Director Ryan Camarda on Royalty Free, his new doc on composer Kevin Macleod". The Pitch. Archived from the original on April 7, 2025.
- Steele, Chandra (August 25, 2021). "These TikTok Songs Have Earned the Most Money in 2021". PCMAG. Archived from the original on June 13, 2025.
- Swanson, Neely (March 26, 2022). "'Royalty Free: The Music of Kevin Macleod' – There's always a price to pay [MOVIE REVIEW]". Easy Reader. Archived from the original on September 6, 2025.
- Tyler, Aaron (May 30, 2017). "Earth From Space & Kevin MacLeod Music". On Stage Magazine. Archived from the original on August 13, 2025.
- Webvideopreis Deutschland (June 13, 2015). Kevin MacLeod gewinnt den Ehrenpreis international [Kevin MacLeod wins the honorary award internationally] (in German). Archived from the original on April 26, 2025 – via YouTube.
- White, Cindy (January 9, 2024). "Here's why you know that song from Will Ferrell and Kristen Wiig's hilarious Golden Globes bit". The A.V. Club. Archived from the original on May 5, 2025.

=== Self-published sources ===
- Jack Lucas Caffrey (October 17, 2023). 2023 Interview With Kevin MacLeod! (Composer of "Monkeys Spinning Monkeys" and "Sneaky Snitch"). Archived from the original on June 10, 2025 – via YouTube.
- MacLeod, Kevin (July 28, 2025). "The AI elephant in the room". Incompetech. Archived from the original on October 6, 2025.
- MacLeod, Kevin. "Fluffing a Duck". Incompetech. Archived from the original on October 6, 2025.
- MacLeod, Kevin. "Frequently Asked Questions". Incompetech. Archived from the original on March 23, 2015.
- MacLeod, Kevin (September 12, 2011). "ISRC codes". Incompetech. Archived from the original on December 15, 2024.
- MacLeod, Kevin. "Monkeys Spinning Monkeys". Incompetech. Archived from the original on August 13, 2025.
- MacLeod, Kevin. "Music License Forms". Incompetech. Archived from the original on June 29, 2025.
- The Vibe Chamber (May 22, 2023). Kevin MacLeod Stock Music Composer Full Interview. Archived from the original on July 8, 2025 – via YouTube.
