= Longshaw =

Coordinates: 53.517233°N 2.7157°W

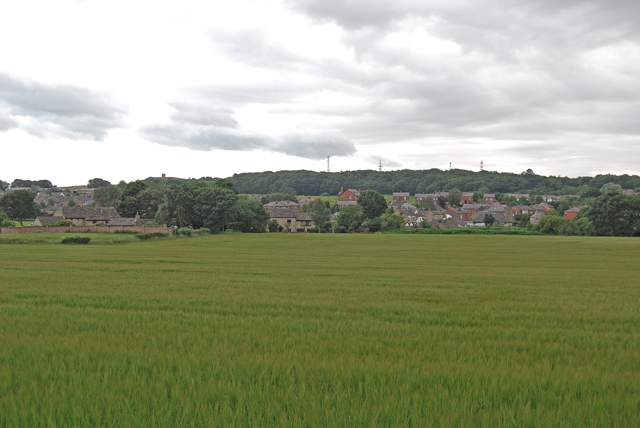
- A view of Longshaw

- Location within Greater Manchester
- OS grid reference: SD525025
- Metropolitan borough: Wigan
- Metropolitan county: Greater Manchester
- Region: North West
- Country: England
- Sovereign state: United Kingdom
- Post town: WIGAN
- Postcode district: WN5
- Dialling code: 01744; 01942
- Police: Greater Manchester
- Fire: Greater Manchester
- Ambulance: North West
- UK Parliament: Makerfield

Longshaw is a small residential and agricultural area within Billinge Higher End at the western boundary of the Metropolitan Borough of Wigan, in Greater Manchester, England. It is situated at the northern foot of Billinge Hill on the B5206 road. Historically, Longshaw was part of Lancashire.

== Governance ==
After being divided into two townships, Billinge Chapel End and Billinge Higher End in the Wigan Poor Law Union, in 1872 Billinge Local Board of Health was established for the area of these two townships and two detached parts of Winstanley township (one known as Blackley Hurst and the other situated in the Carr Mill area, both lying within the area of Billinge Chapel End township).

In 1894 the area of the Local Board (together with the remaining area of Winstanley township) became Billinge Urban District and in 1927 the Urban District was renamed Billinge-and-Winstanley Urban District.

In 1974 Longshaw, Billinge Higher End and most of Winstanley became part of the Metropolitan Borough of Wigan in Greater Manchester, with Billinge (including the remainder of Winstanley) becoming part of the Metropolitan Borough of St Helens in Merseyside.

== Geography ==
Adjacient areas include:

- Billinge
- Garswood
- Orrell
- Winstanley

== Economy ==
Local businesses include a pub (the Hare and Hounds), a K6 telephone box, H A P Construction Ltd and Auto-Motif.

== Transport ==
Longshaw sits on the B5206 road. Train services to Wigan town centre, Manchester and Kirkby are available from the nearby Orrell railway station.
