= Crank Halt railway station =

Former railway station in England

Crank Halt

General information
- Location: Rainford, St Helens; England
- Coordinates: 53.48160°N 2.75370°W
- Grid reference: SJ501987
- Platforms: Two

Other information
- Status: Disused

History
- Original company: St Helens Canal and Railway
- Pre-grouping: London and North Western Railway
- Post-grouping: London, Midland and Scottish Railway

Key dates
- 1 February 1858: Opened as Crank
- 9 September 1940: Renamed Crank Halt
- 18 June 1951: Closed to passengers
Location

Crank Halt was a railway station serving the village of Crank, Merseyside, England on the St Helens to Rainford Junction then Ormskirk line.

== History ==
The station was named Crank railway station from its opening for passengers on 1 February 1858 until 9 September 1940 when it was renamed Crank Halt.

The station was operated by the St Helens Railway, LNWR, the London Midland and Scottish Railway from 1923 and finally British Railways (London Midland Region) until it closed in 1951 for scheduled passenger services. However, the line remained open for goods services and for passenger excursions and diversions up until 1964.

== Location and facilities ==
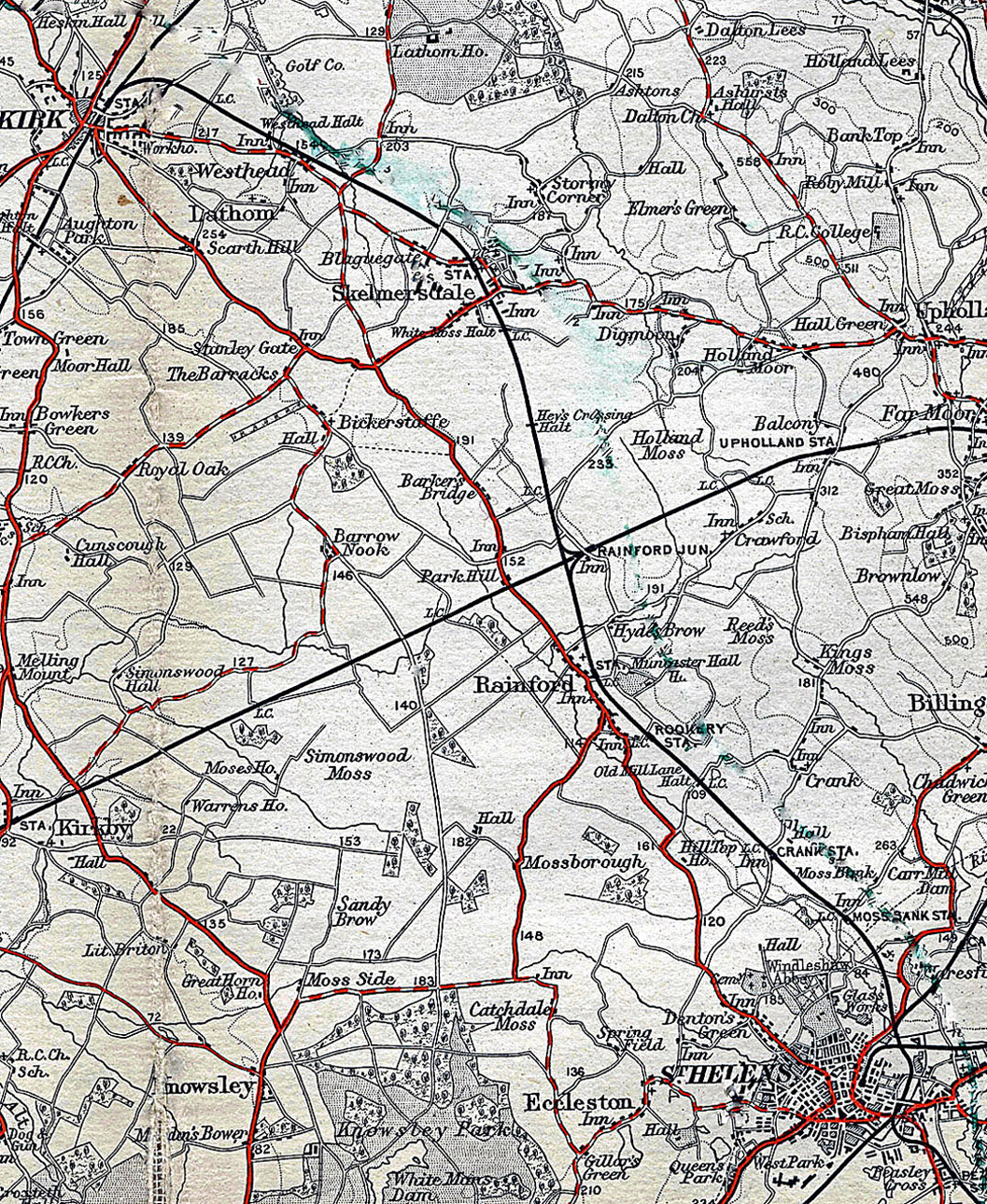
1911 map of the Ormskirk to St Helens area showing the location of Crank station, lower centre right

The station was located at the foot of the hill up to the village just east of the level crossing with the minor road from St Helens to Crank which later became the B5201. It had distinctive wooden buildings on each platform with curved overhanging roofs to provide protection from inclement weather. Some other stations on the line had buildings of the same pattern.

== Services ==
In July 1922 thirteen "Up" (southbound) trains called at the station on weekdays, with an extra on Saturday evenings. All originated at Ormskirk, several with connections from Southport. Ten Up trains called on Sundays. All trains continued all stations to St Helens. The "Down" (northbound) service was similar.

The trains all consisted of "Motor Cars – One class only". 'Motor Cars' then did not have their modern meaning, but consisted of a single railway coach joined to a dedicated steam locomotive. Their generic type is summarised in L&YR railmotors. Photographs appear in Bob Pixton's work on the line.

In 1951 the Up service consisted of five trains on weekdays with three extra on Saturdays, all stations to St Helens. The rolling stock was "Third Class Only". No trains called on Sundays. The Down service was similar.

All local trains plying between Ormskirk and St Helens called at Rainford Junction, entailing a reverse. None used the 'direct line' between Bushey Lane Junction and Randle Junction which formed the third side of the triangle shown near the top of the route diagram. That stretch was the preserve of goods trains, diversions and occasional specials.

== Private sidings ==
Crank Colliery had its own private siding which left the line immediately south of the halt. The colliery company was wound up on 30 January 1880 and the colliery was dismantled. No trace can be seen in the 6" OS Map surveyed in 1892.

Preceding station	Disused railways	Following station
Moss Bank; Line and station closed	London and North Western Railway; St Helens Canal and Railway	Old Mill Lane; Line and station closed
