= Macauley Davies =

English rugby league player (born 1996)

Personal information
- Full name: Macauley Davies
- Born: 4 September 1996 (age 29) Billinge Higher End, Wigan, England

Playing information
- Height: 6 ft 2 in (189 cm)
- Weight: 14 st 13 lb (95 kg)
- Position: Second-row
Club
| Years | Team | Pld | T | G | FG | P |
|---|---|---|---|---|---|---|
| 2016–18 | Wigan Warriors | 1 | 0 | 0 | 0 | 0 |
| 2017(loan) | → Workington Town | 16 | 7 | 0 | 0 | 28 |
| 2018(loan) | → Swinton Lions | 3 | 0 | 0 | 0 | 0 |
| | Total | 20 | 7 | 0 | 0 | 28 |

Macauley Davies (born 4 September 1996) is an English former professional rugby league footballer who played as a second-row forward for the Wigan Warriors in the Super League.

== Background ==
Davies was born in Billinge Higher End, Wigan, England

== Career ==
In 2017, Davies joined Workington Town on a season-long loan deal.
