= Rookery railway station =

Former railway station in England

Rookery

General information
- Location: Rainford, St Helens; England
- Coordinates: 53.4963°N 2.7770°W
- Grid reference: SD486002
- Platforms: Two

Other information
- Status: Disused

History
- Original company: St Helens Canal and Railway
- Pre-grouping: London and North Western Railway
- Post-grouping: London, Midland and Scottish Railway

Key dates
- April 1858: First station opened
- March 1862: First station closed
- 1 June 1865: Second station opened
- 18 June 1951: Closed to passengers
Location

Rookery railway station was on the St Helens to Rainford Junction then Ormskirk line southeast of Rainford, England.

== History ==
The first station opened in 1858 and closed in March 1862. A second station of the same name opened on a site a short distance further north on 1 June 1865.

The station had distinctive wooden buildings on each platform with curved overhanging roofs to provide protection from inclement weather. Some other stations on the line had buildings of the same pattern.

The second station closed on 18 June 1951. Goods trains continued to pass through the station site until 6 July 1964 when the line north of Mill Lane was closed and lifted. Both Rookery stations have been demolished.

== Services ==
In July 1922 thirteen "Up" (southbound) trains called at the station on weekdays, with an extra on Saturday evenings. All originated at Ormskirk, several with connections from Southport. Ten Up trains called on Sundays. All trains continued all stations to St Helens. The "Down" (northbound) service was similar.

The trains all consisted of "Motor Cars - One class only". 'Motor Cars' then did not have their modern meaning, but consisted of a single railway coach joined to a dedicated steam locomotive. Their generic type is summarised in L&YR railmotors. Photographs appear in Bob Pixton's work on the line.

In 1951 the Up service consisted of five trains on weekdays with three extra on Saturdays, all stations to St Helens. The rolling stock was "Third Class Only". No trains called on Sundays. The Down service was similar.

All local trains plying between Ormskirk and St Helens called at Rainford Junction, entailing a reverse. None used the 'direct line' between Bushey Lane Junction and Randle Junction which formed the third side of the triangle shown near the top of the route diagram. That stretch was the preserve of goods trains, diversions and occasional specials.

Preceding station	Disused railways	Following station
Old Mill Lane; Line and station closed	London and North Western Railway; St Helens Canal and Railway	Rainford Village; Line and station closed
