= Birchley Hall =

House in Billinge, Merseyside, England

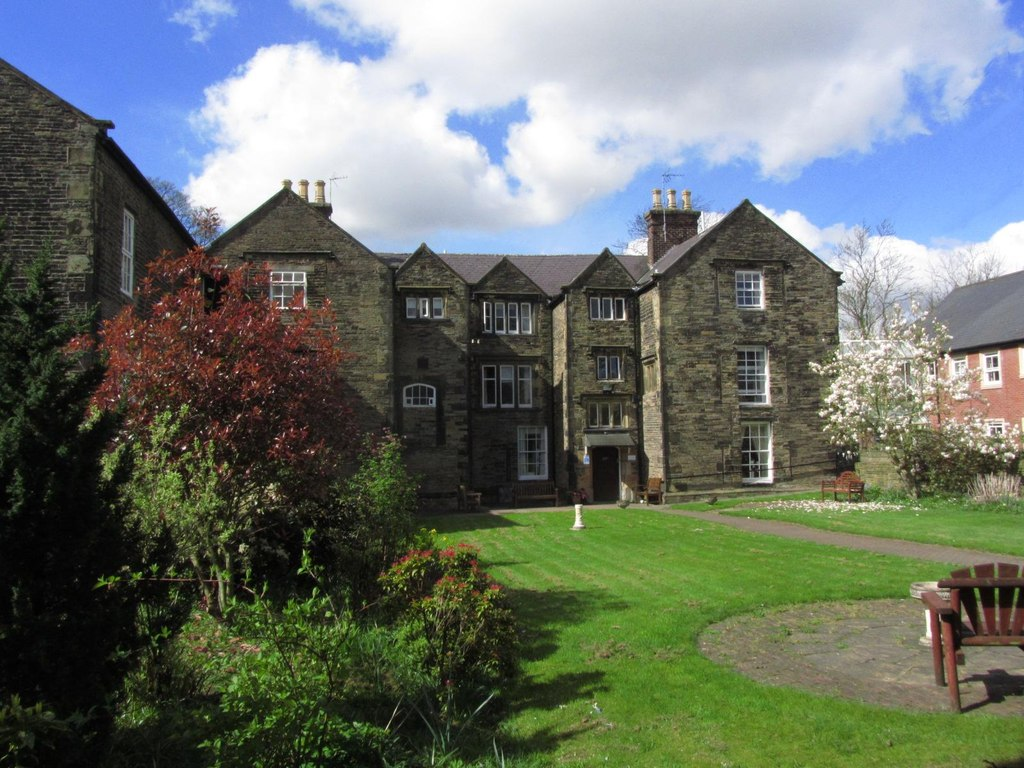
- The hall in 2014

- Location within Merseyside

General information
- Architectural style: Elizabethan
- Location: Billinge, Merseyside, England
- Coordinates: 53.492°N 2.716°W
- Year built: 1594
- Client: Thurston Anderton

Technical details
- Material: Sandstone
- Floor count: 3

Design and construction
- Designations

Listed Building – Grade II*
- Official name: Birchley Hall
- Designated: 23 August 1966
- Reference no.: 1343273

Birchley Hall is a Grade II* listed Elizabethan house built in about 1594, in Billinge, Merseyside, England.

Birchley Hall was bought by Christopher Anderton of Lostock, Bolton in about 1581. The present building was built by one son, James and extended by another son, Thurston in 1594. There is an inscription stone carved with 'TA 1594' on the front of the house, TA being attributed to Thurston. Thurston died in 1598 or 1599 and another brother, Christopher, lived at the hall with his wife Anne Scarisbrick until 1613, when James died, and he inherited Lostock Hall. Another brother, Roger, lived at Birchley Hall until his death in 1640.

== The Birchley Hall press ==
During the Reformation, Birchley Hall was in the county of Lancashire, which was a stronghold for Roman Catholics during their persecution during the reigns of Henry VIII, who destroyed and plundered many monasteries (much of their riches were given to Oxford University colleges), and Queen Elizabeth I. Catholics, especially priests, were driven underground and Catholic literature was vigorously suppressed.

A secret Catholic printing press was set up at Birchley Hall, possibly in about 1604, by Thurstan, whose wife Norris of Speke was a recusant. Roger Anderton more certainly ran a printing press from about 1613. About 19 titles are attributed to the Birchley Hall Press by the English Short Title Catalogue of the British Library.

Many of the books are in the name of John Brerely, which is thought to be a pseudonym of Lawrence Anderton, a cousin of James and his brothers. He was the youngest son of Lawrence Anderton of Chorley, was educated at Blackburn Grammar School, and entered Christ's College, Cambridge University in 1593. He is thought to have originally taken orders in the Anglican Church but went to Rome in 1604 and subsequently joined the Society of Jesus. He published a volume of poems in 1601 in London and The Protestant Apologie in 1604, which may be his first book after becoming a Catholic priest.

== The Birchley Hall chapel ==
One wing of the hall contains a chapel which was used for secret religious services. According to Secret Hiding Places published in 1933, there was a trap door in the vestry floor concealed inside a confessional box. This led to the floor below and into the hall and would have been used for priests to escape discovery. In 1920 a fall of plaster disclosed a secret door to a short tunnel in the wall leading to a look-out in the roof, from which the approach to the house could be watched. It was in poor condition at the time. Hiding places were also discovered (date unknown). In one of these chalices and vestments were found, which were subsequently kept at the local Catholic church. A chalice, however, was stolen from the church in the 1970s. There are also reports of books being found under the floor during a restoration in the 1920s, including an early edition of Ptolemy's Geography. It is not known what happened to these.

Birchley Hall was bought by Vincent Wood from his cousin Joseph Middlehurst in 1945. His son Bernard partially restored the chapel up to the 1970s, when the hall was sold to the charity Sue Ryder Care, which converted it into a home for the elderly. The chapel was fully restored for interdenominational use, and as of 2012 the foundation still runs the hall as a care centre for the elderly.

== The new Birchley Hall Press ==
The word 'press' is used as a descriptive term for the printing operation in the early times, as it is not likely to have been used as a formal title — especially as it would have given away the location of the illegal printing press.

The Birchley Hall Press was resurrected by Bernard Wood, and formally named as such, in 1951 in the same building as the original press, with the publication of This is the Faith (author Francis J Ripley). The actual printing, however, was done by Wood Westworth & Co Ltd a printing company in St Helens, owned by Vincent Wood (and founded by the family in about 1860). A few further titles were published up to at least 1960, including A Flame for Africa (1953) and Liverpool's Hidden Story (1957).

The Birchley Hall Press was resurrected a second time in 2007 by Harry Wood, son of Bernard Wood. It was based in Farnborough, Hampshire and published two online magazines, The British Journal of Healthcare Computing and Information Management (now owned by the Healthcare Information and Management Systems Society) and Medical Technology Business Europe (www.mtbeurope.info), and the website Tropical Trees for Life (www.treesforlife.info) a green project to propagate some of the large amounts of important information on tree planting and management in the tropics that is locked in paper, to give it a greater chance of reaching those who could benefit from it.

== See also ==
- Grade II* listed buildings in Merseyside
- Listed buildings in Billinge, Merseyside

== Bibliography ==
Hawkes, Arthur J (1926). The Birchley Hall Secret Press. London: Reprinted by the Oxford University Press from the transactions of the Bibliographical Society.

Squiers, Granville (1933). Secret Hiding Places: The origins, histories and descriptions of English secret hiding-places, used by priests, cavaliers, Jacobites and smugglers. London: Stanley Paul & Co Ltd.
