= Rainford Village railway station =

Former railway station in England

Rainford Village

General information
- Location: Rainford, St Helens; England
- Coordinates: 53.5027°N 2.7872°W
- Grid reference: SD478010
- Platforms: Two

Other information
- Status: Disused

History
- Original company: St Helens Canal and Railway
- Pre-grouping: London and North Western Railway
- Post-grouping: London, Midland and Scottish Railway

Key dates
- 1 February 1858: Opened as Rainford
- November 1861: Renamed Rainford Village
- 18 June 1951: Closed to passengers
- 6 July 1964: Closed to all traffic
Location

Rainford Village railway station was on the railway line from St Helens to Rainford Junction, then Ormskirk, England.

== Opening and early history ==
The station was opened on 1 February 1858 by the St Helens Canal and Railway Company (SHC&R). The SHC&R was absorbed by the London & North Western Railway (LNWR) on 29 July 1864. From 1 January 1923 the LNWR became part of the London Midland & Scottish Railway (LMS). From 1858 until November 1861, the station was named 'Rainford', but it was thought this would cause confusion with Rainford Junction railway station and the word 'Village' was added.

== Location and facilities ==
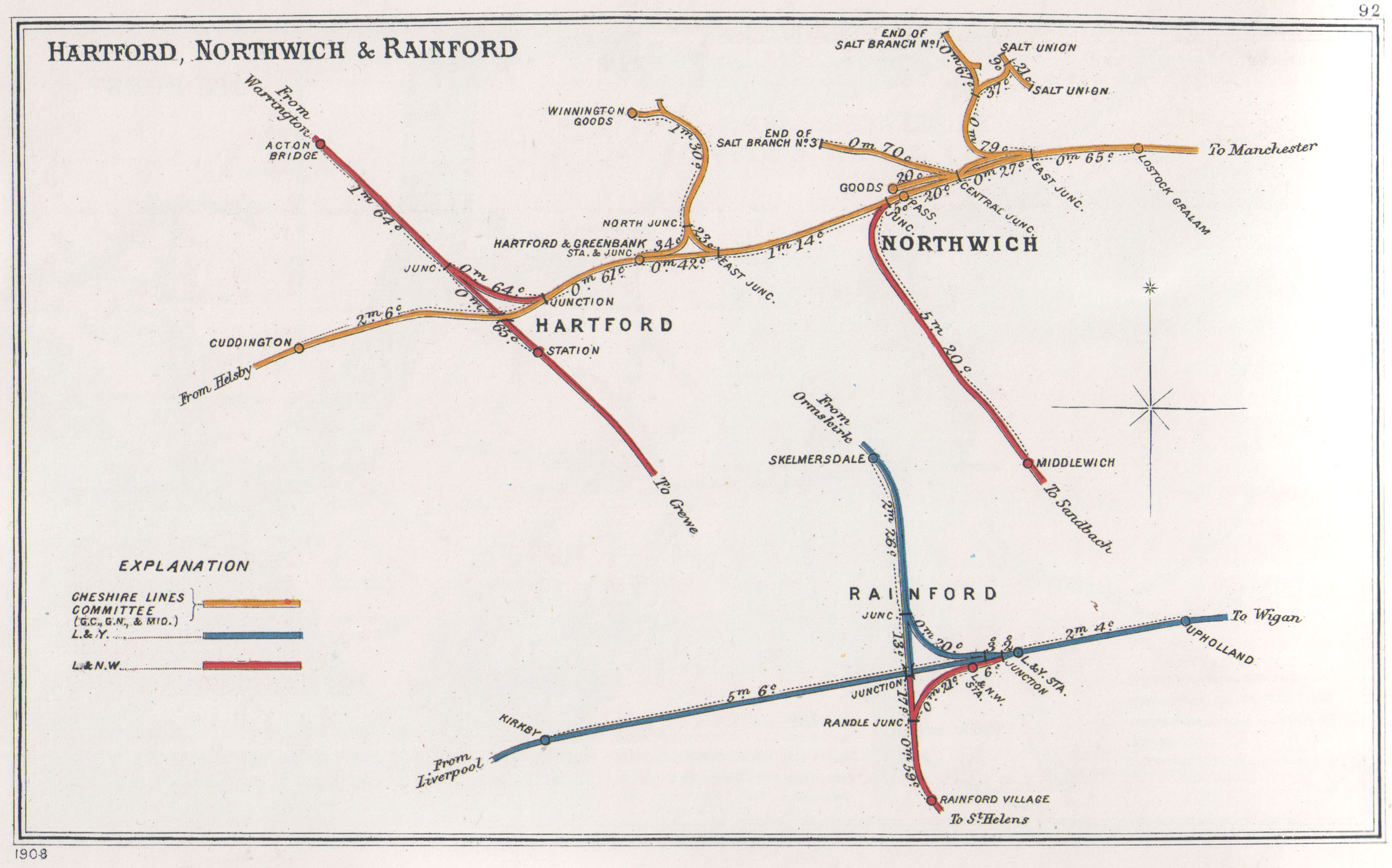
A 1908 Railway Clearing House Junction Diagram showing (lower right) railways in the vicinity of Rainford Village

The station was located immediately north of the level crossing over Crosspit Lane. The main station building for trains to St Helens was on the east side of the twin tracks (furthest from the village centre). A lightly constructed wooden building on the opposite side of the tracks sufficed for passengers towards Rainford Junction and Ormskirk, next to which was the signalbox which controlled the level crossing gates.

== Nearby railway halts ==
Two small lightly built railway 'halts' were constructed nearby to serve other parts of the Rainford area. Rookery, adjacent to Rookery Lane, existed from 1865 until 18 June 1951. Old Mill Lane, adjacent to Pilkington Brothers sand washery a mile south of the village, opened on 1 October 1911 and closed on 18 June 1951.

== Passenger train service ==
The three stations were served by local steam loco-hauled trains, some originating in Ormskirk, with others starting at Rainford Junction. In July 1922, thirteen LNWR trains left Rainford Village for St Helens (Shaw Street) each weekday, all carrying only third class passengers, first class accommodation not being provided.

By July 1946, the LMS timetable showed ten weekdays passenger trains to St Helens, still described as 'one class only'.

In 1951 the Up service consisted of five trains on weekdays with three extra on Saturdays, all stations to St Helens. The rolling stock was "Third Class Only". No trains called on Sundays. The Down service was similar.

British Railways took over the LMSR on 1 January 1948 and withdrew the passenger service on 18 June 1951, closing the station.

== Use of the line by goods trains and post-closure history ==
Rainford Brewery was situated a short distance west of the station. It was rail connected between at least 1890 and 1925.

Victoria Colliery's Nos 3 and 5 pits were connected to the line a short distance north of the station. The colliery went into liquidation in 1891. Around 1900 an engineering firm was established on the colliery site and the siding's connection was renewed in 1905. Over time the engineering works became an oil works, which continued to use rail until August 1961, though cessation was not formally agreed until September 1963.

Goods trains continued to pass through the village until 6 July 1964 when the line north of Mill Lane was closed and lifted. Much of the railway's route through Rainford has been converted to a 'linear park', with shorter stretches used for housing.

Preceding station	Disused railways	Following station
Rainford Junction; Line closed, station open	LNWR; St Helens Railway	Rookery; Line and station closed
