= Listed buildings in Billinge, Merseyside =

Billinge Chapel End is a civil parish in St Helens, Merseyside, England. It contains 13 buildings that are recorded in the National Heritage List for England as designated listed buildings. Of these, two are listed at Grade II*, the middle of the three grades, and the others are at Grade II, the lowest grade. The parish contains the village of Billinge and surrounding countryside. The listed buildings consist of houses, farmhouses, farm buildings, and two churches with associated structures.

== Key ==
Grade	Criteria
II*	Particularly important buildings of more than special interest
II	Buildings of national importance and special interest

== Buildings ==
Name and location	Photograph	Date	Notes	Grade
Birchley Hall; 53.49289°N 2.71862°W	—	1594	A former country house, later used as a care home; a south wing was added in 1618. The house is in stone with a stone-slate roof, it is in three storeys, and has a front of five bays, each of which is gabled. The second and fourth bays project forward, and the outer bays project even further forward. The present Tudor arched entrance is in the fourth bay; the original entrance, now blocked, was in the first floor of the second bay. The windows are mullioned, and some contain sashes. To the south is a wing containing a chapel. Inside the house are the remains of a priest hole.	II*
Great Houghwood Farmhouse; 53.50176°N 2.72582°W	—	Early 17th century	A stone farmhouse with a stone-slate roof, it is in two storeys, and has an L-shaped plan. The windows are later casements, and there are traces of earlier mullions. The entrance is recessed with a Tudor arched head and a massive lintel.	II
St Aidan's Church; 53.50087°N 2.70514°W		1716–18	The church was designed by Henry Sephton, and in 1907–08 the east end was remodelled by T. G. Jackson, adding transepts and increasing the size of the chancel. It is built in stone and has a stone-slate roof. The church consists of a nave with embattled parapets and urns, transepts, and a chancel with an apse. At the west end is a Doric porch, above which is a small tower containing a clock, and surmounted by an open rotunda with columns.	II*
Tomb, St Aidan's Churchyard; 53.50066°N 2.70507°W	—	1720	The tomb is that of George and Kitty Smith. It is in the form of a stone coffin with rings at the ends. On the top is a carving of a snake encircling a winged skull and a curtain.	II
Churchyard walls and gate piers 53.50084°N 2.70557°W		Early 18th century	The stone walls extend along the west and south sides of the churchyard, and have roll moulding on the top. There are gate piers on both sides. The west piers are panelled with recessed quarter-columns on the angles, Doric entablatures, and urn finials. The south piers are square with ball finials.	II
Lime Vale; 53.48956°N 2.72199°W	—	1733	A stone farmhouse with a stone-slate roof, the right side having been rebuilt in brick. It is in two storeys, and has a three-bay front, the left bay projecting forward and gabled. The windows are mullioned, and one also has a transom. The entrance has an architrave and a segmental hood.	II
Crookhurst Farmhouse; 53.49796°N 2.71601°W	—	1753	A stone farmhouse with a stone-slate roof. It has a three-bay front, and is in three storeys, the top floor probably being added later. The windows are casements with plain lintels, and the central doorway has a flat architrave, the lintel being inscribed with initials and the date. In front of the house is a low wall and gateposts with ball finials.	II
Barn, Crookhouse Farm; 53.49763°N 2.71586°W	—	18th century (probable)	The barn is in stone with a stone-slate roof. There are three bays to the left of the entrance and one bay to the right. To the left of this is a lower recessed two-storey two-bay block with an elliptical-arched entrance. On the left side of this block are external stone steps.	II
Great Houghwood Cottage; 53.50170°N 2.72566°W	—	Early 19th century	A roughcast house with a slate roof. It is in two storeys, and has a three-bay front. The windows are sashes. To the left of centre is an entrance containing a Doric doorcase with an open pediment. On the right side is a small 20th-century extension.	II
Nugent House; 53.49191°N 2.70999°W	—	Early 19th century	Originally a house, later part of a school, it is built in stone with a slate roof. The building is in two storeys and has a three-bay front. The windows are sashes with wedge lintels. The central doorway has a Doric doorcase and a fanlight.	II
St Mary's Church and Presbytery; 53.49088°N 2.71776°W		1828	A Roman Catholic church with the apse and presbytery added later in the century. It is built in stone with a slate roof, and consists of a nave with a rectangular apse. At the west end is a porch carried on unfluted Doric columns, a frieze, a cornice, and a bellcote on the gable. The windows in the nave are round-headed with keystones, and in the apse they are lancets. Attached to the rear of the church is the presbytery, with two storeys and a three-bay front.	II
Barn, Otters Swift Farm; 53.48382°N 2.71879°W	—	1860s	A stone barn with a slate roof. It has a central segmental-headed entrance, above which is a coped gable. To the left is a cow house with an entrance over which is a lintel.	II
Farm building, Otters Swift Farm; 53.48378°N 2.71844°W	—	1860s	The farm building consists of a stable and a cart shed. It is built in stone and has a slate roof. The building contains doorways and windows with lintels, ventilation slits, and an arched pitch hole. At the left end is an octagonal stair turret with a cornice, a pyramidal roof, and a weathervane.	II
