= Murder of Helen McCourt =

1988 murder in Lancashire, England

- Undated photo of Helen McCourt
- Date: c. 9 February 1988
- Location: Billinge, Metropolitan Borough of St Helens, Merseyside, England
- Type: Murder
- Motive: Unknown
- Deaths: 1 (Helen McCourt)
- Arrests: 1
- Convicted: Ian Simms
- Charges: Murder
- Trial: March 1989
- Verdict: Guilty
- Sentence: Life sentence with a minimum tariff of 16 years

On 9 February 1988, Helen McCourt, a 22-year-old British insurance clerk from Bootle, Merseyside, disappeared in the village of Billinge, Metropolitan Borough of St Helens, Merseyside, shortly after disembarking from a bus less than 500 yards from her home. Her body has never been found. Ian Simms, a local pub landlord, was convicted of her murder.

The case is a rare example in which a murder conviction has been obtained without the presence of a body, and was among the first in the UK to use DNA fingerprinting. In 2015, McCourt's mother Marie began a campaign to require convicted murderers to reveal the location of their victims' remains before being considered for parole. The campaign led to the introduction of the Prisoners (Disclosure of Information About Victims) Act 2020, popularly known as "Helen's Law" in May 2019. The bill passed into law in November 2020, after Simms's release in February 2020.

Simms died in 2022 without revealing the location of McCourt's body.

== Background and disappearance ==
On 9 February 1988, 22-year-old Helen McCourt spoke with her mother Marie by telephone before 4:00 p.m., shortly before she was due to leave work. She was planning to go out for the evening with her new boyfriend and wanted her tea ready earlier so that she would have time to wash her hair.

Two days before her disappearance, McCourt had been involved in a heated argument with a woman in a pub called the George and Dragon (now the Billinge Arms). The landlord was Ian Simms, who was aged 31 at the time and married with two small children. After the argument, Simms had banned McCourt from the pub and, according to several customers, had used obscene language about her and said how much he hated her. He had made repeated sexual advances to McCourt that she had rejected, and also believed that McCourt knew about his affair with his 21-year-old mistress, whom he had moved into the pub flat behind his wife's back, and was gossiping about it.

McCourt departed the bus around 5:15 p.m. and began the short walk home, a route that took her past the pub. Within minutes, a man leaving another bus heard a loud, abruptly stopped scream coming from the pub. McCourt has never been seen since that night.

== Evidence ==
While being questioned by police, Simms came under suspicion when he became extremely nervous. They also noticed fresh scratches on his neck. His car was impounded, and forensic scientists found traces of McCourt's blood in the form of spots on the rubber sill of the boot and a stain on the boot carpet. In the boot they also found an opal and pearl earring, later identified by McCourt's mother as one of a pair that she had given McCourt for her 21st birthday. McCourt had been wearing the earrings on the day when she vanished. The butterfly clip from the earring was found by a fingertip search of the carpet in the back bedroom of Simms's flat. Traces of her blood and hair were also found on the carpet. More of her blood was also found on the carpet at the foot of the stairs leading to his apartment, and splashed on wallpaper next to the outside door, where police believe that McCourt was first attacked. Police believe that she was struck at least twice in the face. A fingerprint in blood of Simms's left forefinger was also found on the banister rail of the stairs leading to the bedroom.

In March, McCourt's handbag, taupe coat, maroon scarf, navy trousers, white knickers and green mittens were found on a riverbank in Irlam, about 20 miles away, in a black bin liner proved to have been taken from a roll in Simms's pub. Also found with the clothes was a cotton jacket that Simms admitted was his. There were bloodstains on both sleeves and hair from her head, and a fibre from her mittens was found in a pocket. The presence of McCourt's trousers and underwear in the bin liner indicates the strong possibility that Simms sexually assaulted her before killing her.

Fibres from the stair carpet, landing carpet and back bedroom carpet of Simms's flat were found on McCourt's coat and new trousers (worn for the first time that morning), indicating she was dragged upstairs after being attacked by Simms. A witness working in the pub's restaurant testified that she had heard dragging noises from above at the time of the murder. A length of electrical flex was also found with McCourt's clothing that was similar to other lengths of flex found in Simms's flat, which he used when playing with his two dogs. The flex found at Irlam had canine toothmarks that were matched to Simms's dogs. It also had strands of human hair caught in a knot that were matched to hairs from McCourt's hair rollers. It is thought that this flex was used to strangle her.

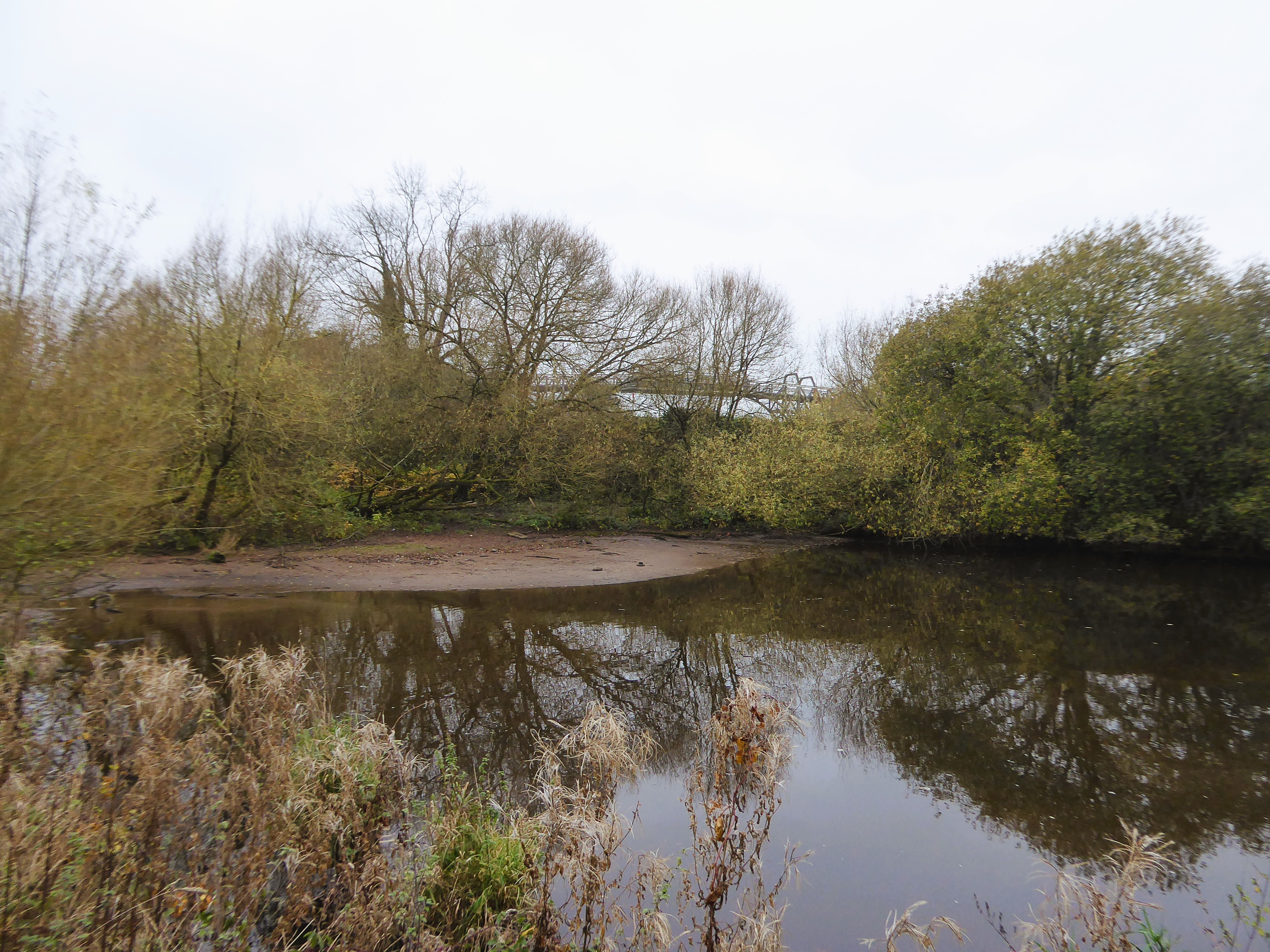
Manchester Ship Canal at Hollins Green

A man also came forward to say that, on the morning after McCourt's disappearance, he had discovered a blood-stained towel while walking his dog along the Manchester Ship Canal in Hollins Green, Warrington. He later discovered a second towel along with several items of men's clothing that also had blood on them. The blood was later identified as McCourt's. The jumper had a logo for Labatt, a brand of beer popular at the George and Dragon pub. When asked about the clothes, Simms at first denied that they were his. After his wife and mistress both confirmed that the clothes were indeed his, he changed his story.

== Trial ==
At his trial in 1989, Simms denied murdering McCourt, claiming that someone must have entered his flat, stolen his clothes and dressed in them and attacked and murdered her without his knowledge. This person had then used his car to dispose of McCourt's body and then left his clothes where they would be found to incriminate him. Simms admitted that he was in the pub from 4:20 to 6:00 p.m. He could not explain how this other person could have entered the pub dressed in his clothes and attacked and murdered McCourt without disturbing him or his Rottweiler guard dog. The jury convicted him of the murder. Simms was among the first people to be convicted on DNA evidence without the discovery of the victim's body.

In the absence of McCourt's body, forensic scientists used a new technique with blood samples from her parents compared against the blood found in Simms's apartment, on his clothes and in the boot of his car. The odds were 126,000 to one against the blood not being from a child of McCourt's parents. In 1999, Simms challenged the findings based on the DNA evidence, although improved DNA technology suggested that the odds against the blood not being McCourt's were nine million to one. Investigative journalist Bob Woffinden campaigned for Simms, claiming he was innocent. After Woffinden was initially banned from visiting Simms in jail in order to publicise his story, something that was welcomed by McCourt's parents, the applicable law was changed to allow inmates' stories to be told in the media by journalists.

Simms was assessed a life sentence with a minimum tariff of 16 years. He continued to maintain his innocence.

== Aftermath ==
Since her daughter's disappearance, Marie McCourt has devoted herself to work for Support after Murder and Manslaughter (SAMM), and continued to pressure Simms to reveal the location of Helen's body. She lobbied the department of the Lord Chancellor to have him charged with preventing a burial, and to introduce a law preventing prisoner release if the victim's location remained undisclosed. Marie continued to search for her daughter's body.

In July 2008, a marble bench was placed on the grounds of St. Mary's Roman Catholic Church, Billinge to mark what would have been McCourt's 43rd birthday. In February 2013, a memorial Mass for McCourt was held on the 25th anniversary of her disappearance.

On 16 October 2013, police exhumed a grave behind St Aidan's Anglican Church, Billinge after receiving a tipoff that McCourt's body had been placed inside an open grave ahead of a burial at the church in February 1988. The exhumation showed that McCourt's remains had not been placed there.

Simms never disclosed the whereabouts of McCourt's body. Simms was allowed on temporary release from prison in March 2019. On 21 November 2019 it was reported that a Parole Board review on 8 November had recommended Simms for parole, finding that he had "met the terms for release." In February 2020, the McCourt family's bid to keep Simms in jail was refused and Simms was released on licence. Simms died on 24 June 2022 without having revealed the location of McCourt's body.

== Helen's Law ==
In December 2015, Marie McCourt launched a campaign to enact a law that would prevent convicted murderers who refuse to reveal the location of bodies of victims from being released on parole.

In May 2019, the UK's Ministry of Justice announced plans to legislate so that parole would place "greater consideration on failure to disclose the location of a victim's remains". The law was formally titled the "Prisoners (Disclosure of Information About Victims) Act". In cases of murder, manslaughter and indecent photographs or pseudo-photographs of children, it places a legal duty on the parole board to consider nondisclosure of the victim's or victims' remains when deciding upon release, where the board believes they have knowledge of it. The law also applies where a conviction for these crimes was for any equivalent offence under the law of another country, and the prisoner is to be considered by the parole board.

On 5 July 2019, Secretary of State for Justice David Gauke confirmed that the law would be adopted in England and Wales.

The bill was placed before Parliament and ran out of time before its dissolution ahead of the 2019 general election. On discovering that her daughter's killer would be released, Marie McCourt urged the next government to introduce the law as a matter of urgency. Simms was released in February 2020, before the bill passed into law.

Helen's Law has been criticised by victims' families, advocates and others as "a law without teeth."

== See also ==
- John Cannan – British man suspected to have murdered the missing Suzy Lamplugh
- James Hanratty – a murderer for whom Bob Woffinden also campaigned to be cleared and was later proven to be guilty
- Murder of Alison Shaughnessy – a case in which Woffinden successfully campaigned for the convicted murderer to be freed. There remain no other suspects.
- Murder of Billie-Jo Jenkins – another case in which Woffinden campaigned for the convicted murderer to be freed
- Murder of Tulay Goren – Kurdish honour killing victim whose body disappeared after her murder in Woodford
- List of major crimes in the United Kingdom
- List of murder convictions without a body
- Lists of solved missing person cases
