= Bispham =

Bispham is the name of places in Lancashire, England

- Bispham, Blackpool, a suburb
- Bispham, West Lancashire, a civil parish
  - Bispham Green, a village within that parish

It may also refer to:

- David Bispham, an American baritone
- Bispham Hall, a country house in Billinge, Wigan
