= Bispham Hall =

Country house in Greater Manchester, England

- Location within Greater Manchester

General information
- Location: Billinge, Greater Manchester, England
- Coordinates: 53.516724°N 2.720148°W
- Year built: 1573 with later extensions

Design and construction
- Designations

Listed Building – Grade II*
- Official name: Bispham Hall
- Designated: 22 August 1966
- Reference no.: 1068434

Website
- www.bisphamhall.org.uk

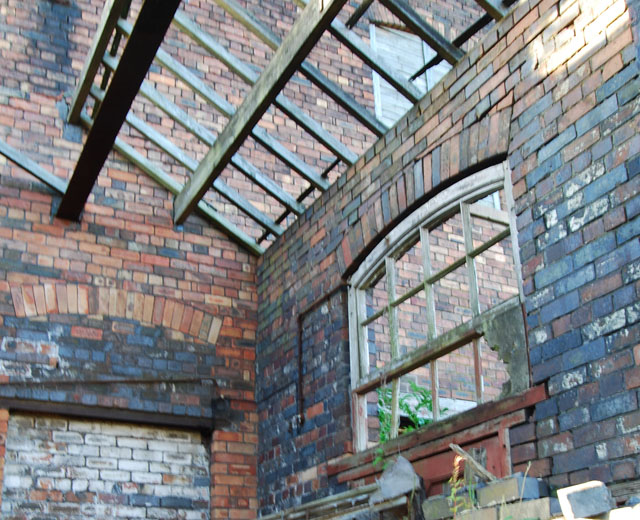
Bispham Hall Brick Works

Bispham Hall is a Grade II* listed Elizabethan country house in Billinge, now part of the Metropolitan Borough of Wigan in Greater Manchester, England.

== History ==
Bispham Hall was named after the Bispham family who acquired the estate by marriage in 1346 and held it until 1730. It then passed to the Leigh family of Whitley Hall, Wigan. In 1825 the property had descended to John Holt, who had inherited it in 1816 from his unmarried brother Robert. In 1841 John Holt left the property to William Mills, a distant relative of Cheshire, on condition that the latter adopted the surname of Holt. On William's death, the estate passed to his son William Thomas, who died in 1857, leaving it to be divided between his six sisters, whereby it was sold in 1871 to coal-producer Meyrick Holmes Bankes of Winstanley Hall.

The Bispham estate was acquired by the Boy Scout Association in 1948 as an activity centre. The hall itself was gutted by a fire in 1977 or 1978, but has been since restored by the Vivat Trust and is now privately owned. The scout activity centre provides, in addition to indoor accommodation facilities, field camping areas for large groups and smaller woodland clearings for smaller groups. Varied outdoor facilities are organised, including climbing, orienteering, canoeing and team sports.

== Architecture ==
The hall was built in 1573 but has been extended since. It is constructed to an E-shaped plan in dressed stone with ashlar dressings in three storeys, with a frontage of five gabled bays. The second and fourth bays project but the first and fifth bays project even further and are wider. Despite interior damage caused by fire, the hall remains one of the most complete examples of 16th-century architecture in the historic county of Lancashire.

== Grounds ==
The surrounding park, at one time much larger than the 60-acre (24 ha) estate which exists today, had extensive woodlands which contain an 1815 monument to the Duke of Wellington and a smaller monument to either a horse or dog called Dash.

== Folklore ==
Local folklore surrounding Bispham Hall includes tales of two ghosts. One legend claims that the spirit of Nellie Bispham haunts the woods surrounding the hall. Another story involves the ghost of Flo Demon, who is said to haunt the bunkhouse following her alleged death by axe in 1993.

== See also ==
- Grade II* listed buildings in Greater Manchester
- Listed buildings in Billinge and Winstanley
