= St Mary's Church, Billinge =

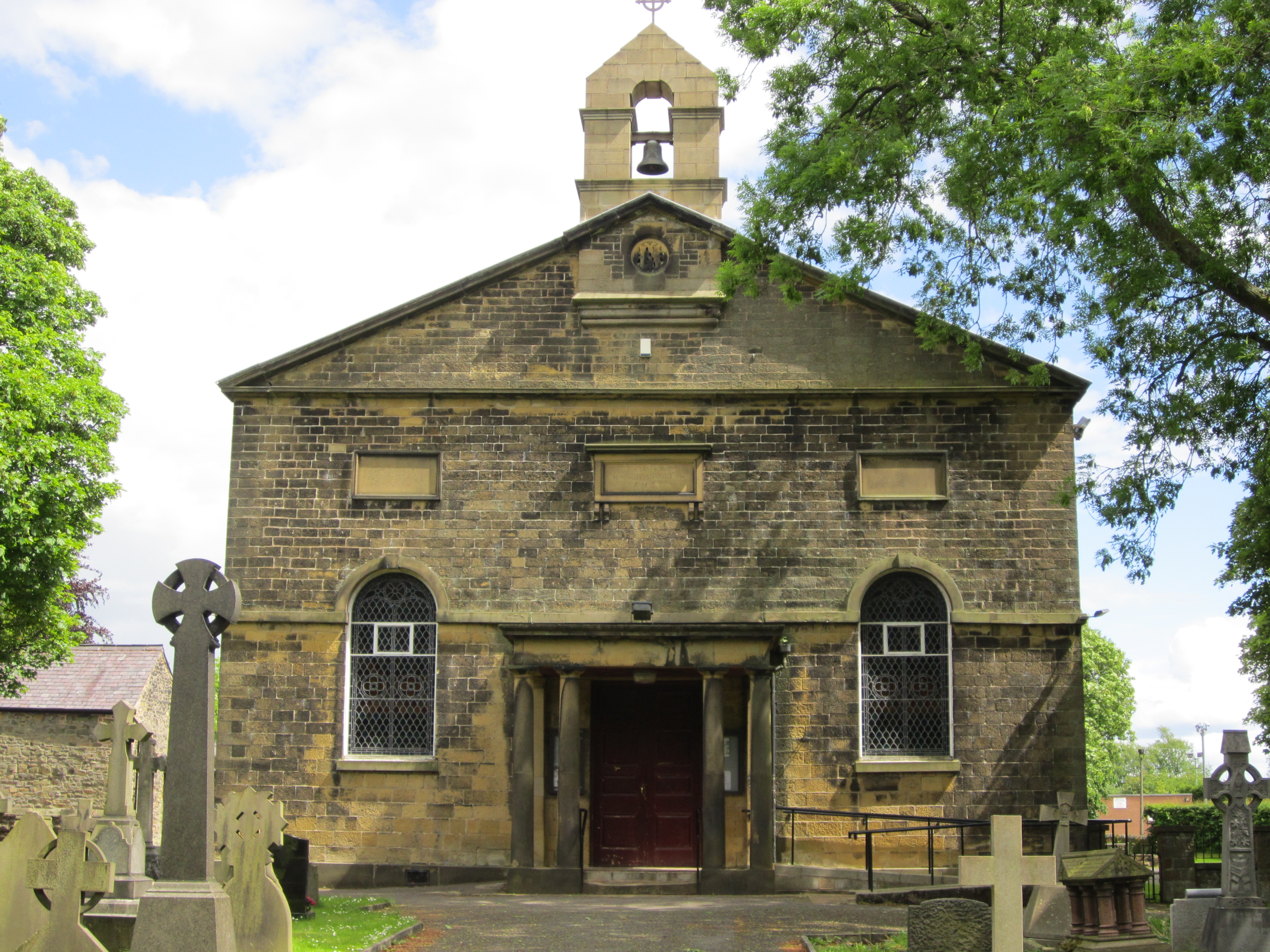
- West end of St Mary's Church, Billinge

- Location in Merseyside
- 53.4909°N 2.7178°W
- OS grid reference: SJ 525 996
- Location: Birchley Road, Billinge, St Helens, Merseyside
- Country: England
- Denomination: Roman Catholic

History
- Status: Parish church

Architecture
- Functional status: Active
- Heritage designation: Grade II
- Designated: 23 August 1985
- Architectural type: Church
- Style: Georgian
- Groundbreaking: 1828
- Completed: Late 19th century

Specifications
- Materials: Stone, slate roof

Administration
- Diocese: Liverpool

Clergy
- Priest: Rev. Paul V. Harris SDS

St Mary's Church is an active Roman Catholic church along Birchley Road, Billinge, St Helens, Merseyside, England. Belonging to the archdiocese of Liverpool, the church was built in 1828, and extended later in that century. It is recorded in the National Heritage List for England as a designated Grade II listed building. In July 2020 its parish area was increased following the closure of St. Patrick's, Clinkham Wood and the merger of the two parishes under the one Parish Priest.

== History ==
St Mary's church was built in 1828, and the apse and presbytery were added in later in the 19th century.

== Architecture ==
=== Exterior ===
The church is constructed in stone, and has a slate roof. Its plan consists of a three-bay nave with an apsidal chancel. The west end is pedimented and has three bays with a central doorway. This has a porch flanked by paired unfluted Doric columns above which is a frieze and a cornice. The outer bays contain round-headed windows with keystones. Above the porch and the windows are three rectangular panels. The gable contains a projecting panel with entwined initials, and it is surmounted by a bellcote. Along the sides of the church are round-headed windows with keystones, and panels above them. In the apse are round-headed lancet windows.

=== Interior ===
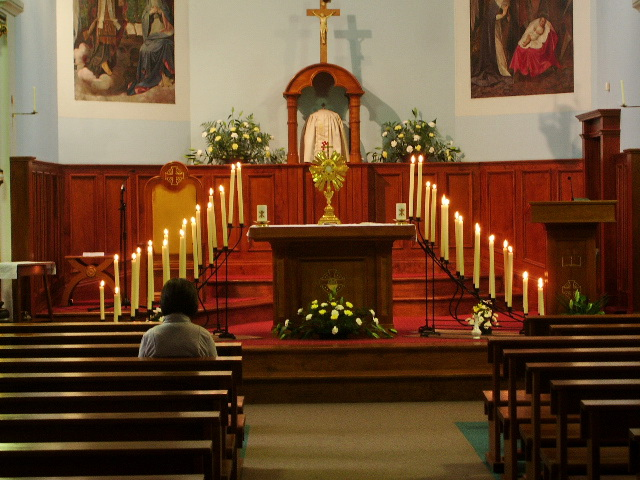
Interior

Inside the church is a segmental vaulted ceiling. There is a small west gallery over an internal porch. The round chancel arch is carried on round pillars with scrolled capitals. In the apse are large paintings, a niche and an altar. The font dates from 1877, it is in alabaster on marble shafts, and contains panels with evangelists' symbols.

=== Presbytery ===
Attached to the east end of the church is the presbytery, which is in two storeys and has a three-bay front. The third bay is gabled and contains a single-storey canted bay window with a hipped roof. In the centre is an entrance with a gabled porch.

== Appraisal ==
On 23 August 1985 the church and the presbytery were designated together as a Grade II listed building. This grade is the lowest of the three grades of listing, and is applied to buildings that are "nationally important and of special interest". Pollard and Pevsner comment in the Buildings of England series that the church has "an almost featureless barn of an interior".

== See also ==
- Listed buildings in Billinge, Merseyside
