= St Aidan's Church, Billinge =

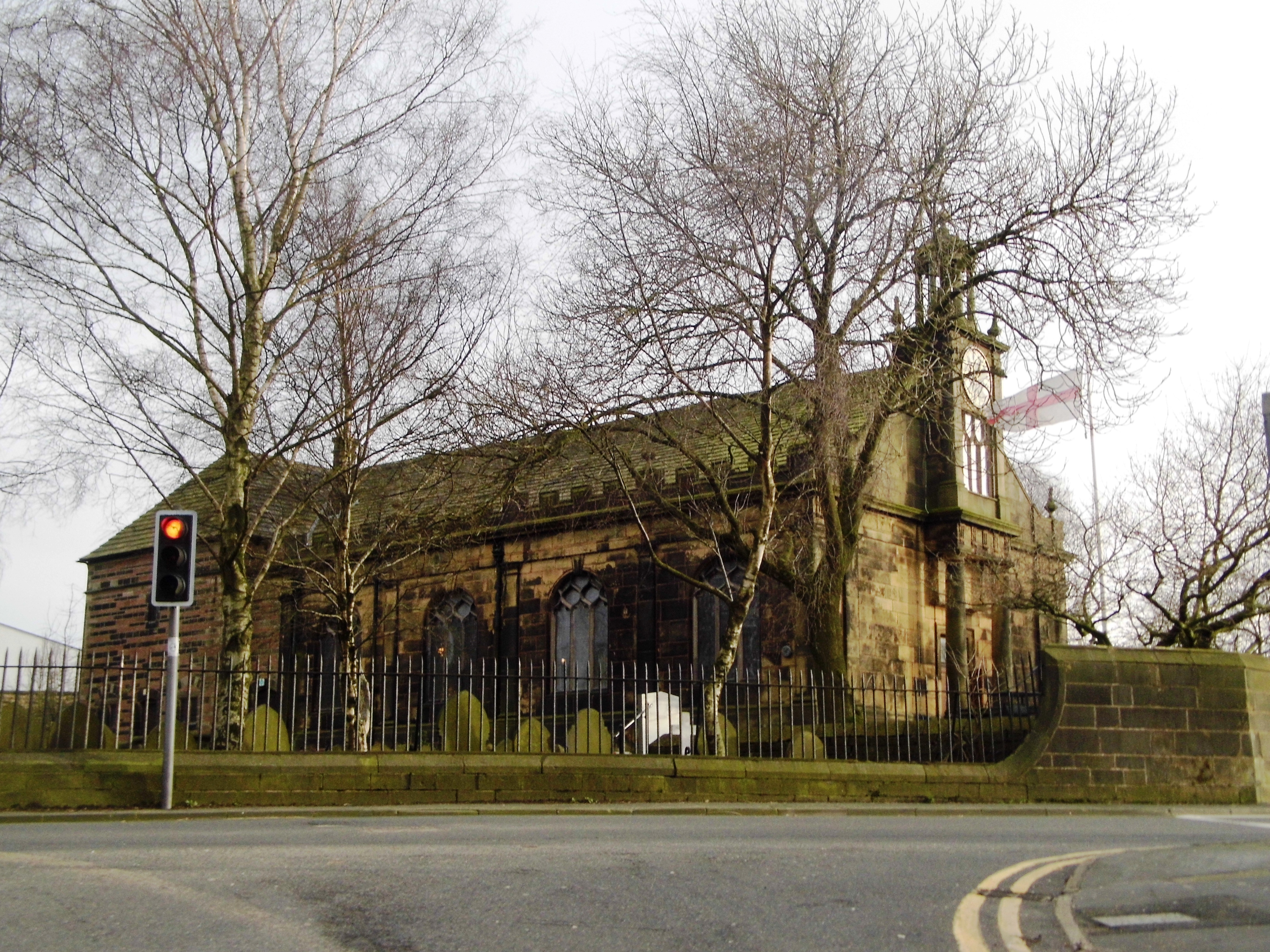
- St Aidan's Church, Billinge, from the northwest

- Location in Merseyside
- 53.5009°N 2.7051°W
- OS grid reference: SD 533 007
- Location: Main Street, Billinge, St Helens, Merseyside
- Country: England
- Denomination: Anglican
- Churchmanship: Evangelical
- Website: St Aidan, Billinge

History
- Status: Parish church
- Founded: c. 1539
- Dedication: Saint Aidan

Architecture
- Functional status: Active
- Heritage designation: Grade II*
- Designated: 23 August 1966
- Architect(s): Henry Sephton; T. G. Jackson
- Architectural type: Church
- Style: Georgian, Gothic Revival
- Groundbreaking: 1716
- Completed: 1908

Specifications
- Materials: Stone, stone-slate roof

Administration
- Province: York
- Diocese: Liverpool
- Archdeaconry: Warrington
- Deanery: Wigan
- Parish: Billinge

Clergy
- Vicar: none currently

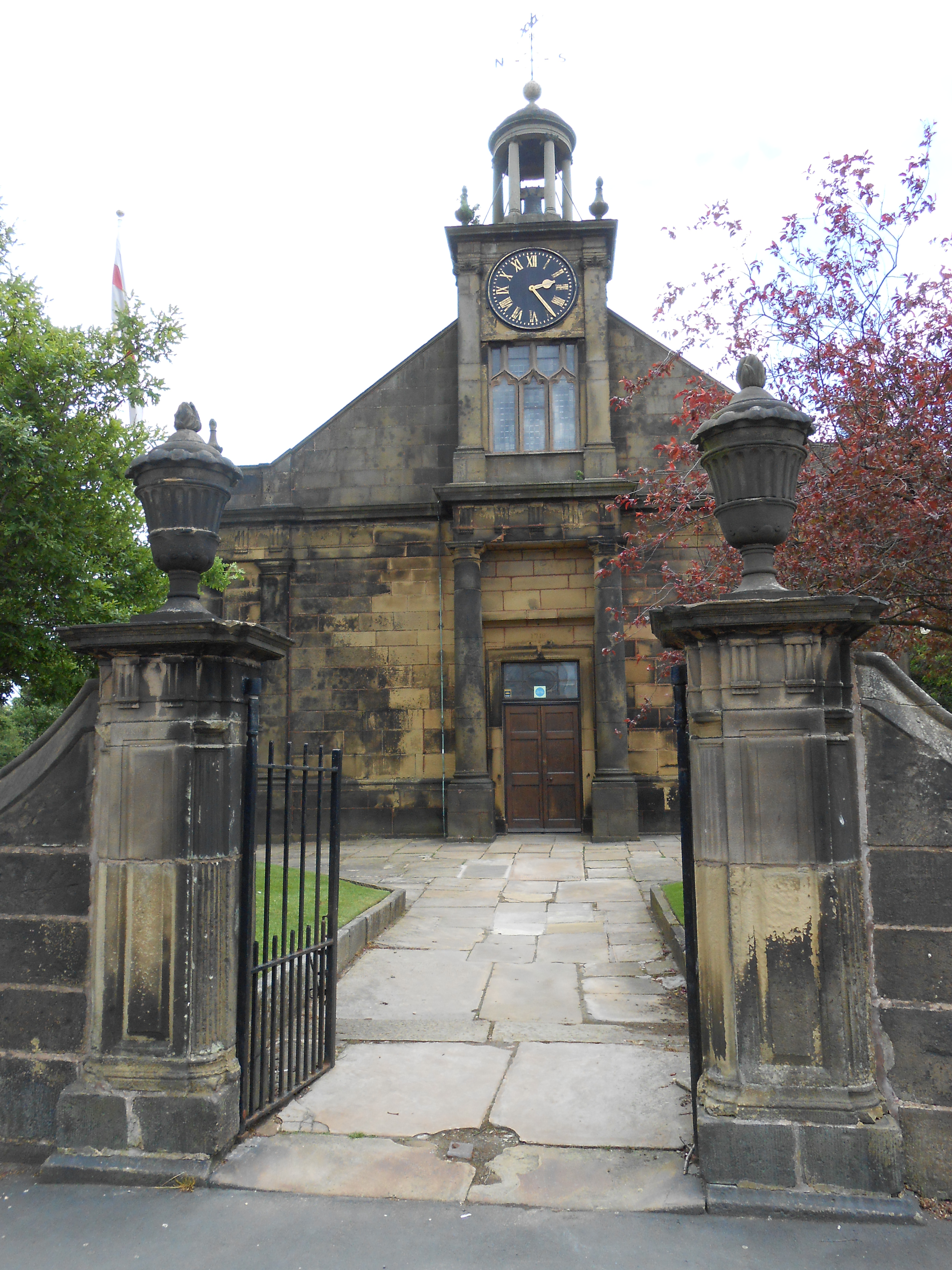
West end also showing gate piers

St Aidan's Church is in Main Street, Billinge, St Helens, Merseyside, England. It is an active Anglican parish church in the diocese of Liverpool. It was built in 1716–18 to replace a chapel of ease on the site, and was remodelled and extended in 1907–08. The church is recorded in the National Heritage List for England as a designated Grade II* listed building.

== History ==
The church originated as a chapel of ease in about 1539. The chapel was replaced by the present church, built between 1716 and 1718, and was designed by Henry Sephton. A major influence in this rebuilding was James Scarisbricke, a Liverpool merchant who donated £200 towards its cost. The church had a rectangular plan measuring 57 feet (17.4 m) by 37 feet (11.3 m) with a small apse at the east end, and could seat 200 people. Galleries were added to the north and south sides of the church in 1823 and 1824 respectively. The church became a separate parish in its own right in 1828. The building was rebuilt and extended in 1907–08 by T. G. Jackson. He moved the apse towards the east, adding a transept to the south, and an organ loft and vestry to the north, thereby increasing the size of the chancel. At the same time the north and south galleries and the box pews were removed. A glass screen was inserted under the west gallery in 1993.

== Architecture ==
=== Exterior ===
St Aidan's is built in stone and has a stone-slate roof. Its plan consists of a four-bay nave, a south transept forming a chapel, a north organ loft, and a chancel with a round apse. At the west end of the nave are pairs of corner pilasters, and portions of a triglyph frieze. In the centre is a doorway flanked by detached Doric columns. The doorway has an architrave and a fanlight. Above the doorway is a small tower with Ionic pilasters at the corners, between which is a three-light window with a square head containing Gothic tracery, and above that is a clock face. On the top of the tower are four urns at the corners, and a cupola containing a bell. The cupola is carried on Tuscan columns, and is surmounted by a ball finial and a weather vane. Along the sides of the nave are three-light round-headed windows with triple keystones and containing reticulated tracery. Between the bays are Doric pilasters. Above the windows is an Ionic entablature, and an embattled parapet with urns at intervals. In the south transept is a four-light window. The windows in the apse are similar to those in the nave, and a balustrade is along the top of the apse.

=== Interior ===
Inside the church the round-arched arcades are carried on Doric columns with high plinths. The roof is barrel vaulted. At the west end is a gallery carried on slender columns. Around the apse is a fluted flat Corinthian pilastrade, and a frieze containing cherubs. In the church is a brass chandelier dating from the 18th century, and a communion table in the south transept dating from the early 18th century. The brass lectern was given to the church in 1909 as a memorial to a previous vicar, and is a copy of a lectern given to York Minster in 1686. The chancel windows contain stained glass from 1913 made by Hardman. In the church is an 18th-century brass tablet that was originally in the pew of James Scarisbricke, whose donation towards the building of the church is recorded on a board on the south wall. The pipe organ was installed in the church in 1919 as a war memorial. It was made by Jardine and Company of Manchester, and has two manuals and 19 stops.

== Appraisal ==
On 23 August 1966 the church was designated as a Grade II* listed building. Grade II* is the middle of the three grades of listing, and is applied to buildings that are "particularly important buildings of more than special interest".

== Associated structures ==
On the south side of the church in the churchyard is the tomb of George and Kitty Smith. It is inscribed with the date 1720and consists of a stone coffin with rings at the ends. On the top is a carving of a curtain and of a snake encircling a winged skull. There is an inscription but, apart from the date, this is illegible. The tomb is listed at Grade II. This grade is the lowest of the three grades of listing, and is applied to buildings that are "nationally important and of special interest". The churchyard walls and the gate piers in the walls are also designed at Grade II. The walls extend along the west and south walls of the churchyard. They date from the early 18th century, are in stone, and have weathered coping with roll moulding on the top. There are gates with piers on the west and south sides. The west piers are panelled with recessed quarter-columns on the angles, and have Doric entablatures and urn finials. The south piers are plainer, they are square and surmounted by ball finials.

== Present day ==
St Aidan's is an active Anglican parish church in the deanery of Wigan, the archdeaconry of Warrington, and the diocese of Liverpool. Its style of worship is Evangelical. The church holds regular services on Sundays and weekdays, arranges baptisms, weddings and funerals, and runs a number of organisations,

== See also ==
- Grade II* listed buildings in Merseyside
- Listed buildings in Billinge, Merseyside
