= James Bradshaw (minister) =

English clergyman and minister (c. 1636–1702)

James Bradshaw (1636? – 1702), was an English clergyman and ejected minister.

== Life ==
James Bradshaw was related to the Bradshaws of Haigh, near Wigan, the elder and royalist branch of the family. He was born at Hacken in the parish of Bolton, Lancashire, about 1636. He was educated at the Bolton grammar school and Corpus Christi College, Oxford, but did not graduate. This was due to the influence of his uncle William Holmes, vicar of Guilsborough, Northamptonshire, under whom he studied divinity. Returning to Lancashire, he was ordained minister of Hindley. With other Lancashire ministers, he was involved in the royalist rising under Sir George Booth. He was ejected in 1662, but, continuing to preach, he suffered some months' imprisonment at the instance of his relative Sir Roger Bradshaw, an episcopalian magistrate.

After the indulgence of 1672 Bradshaw was appointed as the minister of Rainford Chapel, in the parish of Prescot. The neighboring clergy now and then preached for him, reading the prayer-book; hence the churchwarden was able to say 'yes' to the question at visitations: 'Have you common prayer read yearly in your chapel?' John Pearson, the bishop of Chester, would not sustain information against peaceable ministers, so Bradshaw was not disturbed. He was also one of the Monday lecturers at Bolton.

James Bradshaw died at Rainford in 1702, in his sixty-seventh year, his death being the result of a mishap while riding to preach. His son Ebenezer, presbyterian minister at Ramsgate, was ordained 22 June 1694 in Dr. Annesley's meeting-house, Bishopsgate Within, near Little St. Helen's (this was at the first public ordination among presbyterians after the Restoration).

== Works ==
- The Sleepy Spouse of Christ alarm'd, &c., 1677, 12mo (sermons on Cant. v., preface by Nathaniel Vincent, M.A., who died 21 June 1697, aged 52).
- The Trial and Triumph of Faith.
