= Listed buildings in Billinge and Winstanley =

Billinge and Winstanley is an area in the Metropolitan Borough of Wigan, Greater Manchester, England. The area, consisting of small settlements and surrounding countryside, includes 11 listed buildings recorded in the National Heritage List for England. Of these, three are listed at Grade II*, the middle of the three grades, and the others are at Grade II, the lowest grade. Most of the listed buildings are houses and associated structures, the others being monuments and a set of stocks.

== Key ==
Grade	Criteria
II*	Particularly important buildings of more than special interest
II	Buildings of national importance and special interest

== Buildings ==
Name and location	Photograph	Date	Notes	Grade
Bispham Hall; 53.51670°N 2.72012°W	—	1573	A large stone house that was damaged by fire in the 1990s. It is on a plinth, and has quoins, two storeys and five gabled bays, the bays projecting to different degrees. The windows are mullioned, some also with transoms, and they have hood moulds. The doorway is round-headed, with impost blocks. There are large chimneystacks on both returns.	II*
Winstanley Hall; 53.52259°N 2.68890°W		c. 1573	A country house that was extended in 1818–19 by Lewis Wyatt, and again later in the 19th century. The entrance front has five bays and a projecting four-storey tower with a Doric porch, a round-headed doorway, an Ionic entablature, a pulvinated frieze and a parapet. The garden front has three storeys, and five bays, with a two-storey three-bay extension to the right. The windows vary; some are mullioned, some also with transoms, some are sashes, and there are some Diocletian windows.	II*
Barn and stable, Winstanley Hall; 53.52262°N 2.68755°W	—	17th century	The barn and stables form blocks on three sides of a courtyard, the barn being the oldest, and the stables dating from the 19th century, and all are in stone. The west block has two storeys and five bays, the central bay larger and projecting. The seven-bay barn adjoins it, and at the north end is a two-storey two-bay cottage. The block is joined by a screen wall to the south block, which also has two storeys and five bays with a clock face and pigeon holes in the central bay. The north block has seven bays with canted ends, and has two hexagonal cupolas with Tuscan columns. There are also various cast iron gates, railings and piers.	II*
Cosy Cottage; 53.51471°N 2.70630°W		Late 17th century (probable)	The house was later extended by one bay to the left. It is in stone, mainly rendered, with a stone-slate roof. There are two storeys, three bays, and a lean-to extension at the rear. The windows in the original part are mullioned, and in the left bay there is a casement window on the ground floor and a horizontally-sliding sash window above.	II
Gautley House; 53.52092°N 2.72088°W	—	Late 17th century	A stone house with quoins and a slate roof. There are two storeys and three bays, the outer bays projecting forward and gabled. There is one casement window, and the other windows are mullioned.	II
Stocks, Windy Arbour; 53.51172°N 2.68895°W		18th century	The stocks are in an enclosure by the side of the road. They consist of two stone posts with shaped heads and two timber boards. At the rear is a 20th-century bench.	II
Wellington Monument; 53.51660°N 2.71849°W	—	1815	The monument to the east of Bispham Hall commemorates the Duke of Wellington and the victory at the Battle of Waterloo. It is in stone and consists of a square plinth and an obelisk surmounted by a ball finial. There are inscriptions in English and Latin.	II
Wigan Lodge and gate piers, Winstanley Hall; 53.52444°N 2.67724°W		c. 1818	The lodge and gate piers are in stone. The lodge has a top cornice, a parapet, two storeys and a rectangular plan with a rear extension. The windows are mullioned or mullioned and transomed with hood moulds. On the front facing the road is a rectangular bay window with a cornice and parapet. In the rear extension is a pulvinated frieze. The rectangular gate piers are rusticated and have entablature caps, and the gates are in cast iron.	II
Monument south of Bispham Hall; 53.51658°N 2.71999°W		Early 19th century (probable)	The monument, which probably commemorates a dog, is in stone. It consists of a small obelisk on a simple plinth, which carries the inscription Alas, Poor Faithful Dash.	II
Neptune fountain, Winstanley Hall; 53.52277°N 2.68795°W	—	c. 1830	The statue is in the stable courtyard. It is in stone and has an octagonal basin with a waterlily frieze. This contains a statue of Neptune on a throne on a clam shell with three horses.	II
Estate office and cottage, Winstanley Hall; 53.52296°N 2.68850°W	—	1884	The office and cottage are in stone with slate roofs. The estate office has two storeys with an attic, two bays, lozenge moulded bands, rusticated quoins, and a pilaster above the entrance. The windows are mullioned with rusticated architraves, and contain casements. To the left is a single-storey wing connecting to the cottage, which has two storeys, two bays, and a hipped roof.	II
