= Moss Bank railway station =

Former railway station in England

Moss Bank

General information
- Location: St Helens, St Helens; England
- Coordinates: 53.474130°N 2.739972°W
- Grid reference: SJ510977
- Platforms: Two

Other information
- Status: Disused

History
- Original company: St Helens Canal and Railway
- Pre-grouping: London and North Western Railway
- Post-grouping: London, Midland and Scottish Railway

Key dates
- 1 February 1858: Opened
- 18 June 1951: Closed to passengers
- 6 July 1964: Closed to all traffic
Location

Moss Bank railway station was on the St Helens to Rainford Junction then Ormskirk line on the northern edge of St Helens, England. It opened on 3 February 1858 and closed to passengers on 18 June 1951. The line through the station closed in 1964 and has since been lifted.

The station had distinctive wooden buildings on each platform with curved overhanging roofs to provide protection from inclement weather. Some other stations on the line had buildings of the same pattern.

The station has been demolished. Scafell Road runs through its site.

== Services ==
In July 1922 thirteen "Up" (southbound) trains called at the station on weekdays, with an extra on Saturday evenings. All originated at Ormskirk, several with connections from Southport. Ten Up trains called on Sundays. All trains continued all stations to St Helens. The "Down" (northbound) service was similar.

The trains all consisted of "Motor Cars - One class only". Please note that 'Motor Cars' then did not have their modern meaning, but consisted of a single railway coach joined to a dedicated steam locomotive. Their generic type is summarised in L&YR railmotors. Photographs appear in Bob Pixton's work on the line.

In 1951 the Up service consisted of five trains on weekdays with three extra on Saturdays, all stations to St Helens. The rolling stock was "Third Class Only". No trains called on Sundays. The Down service was similar.

All local trains plying between Ormskirk and St Helens called at Rainford Junction, entailing a reverse. None used the 'direct line' between Bushey Lane Junction and Randle Junction which formed the third side of the triangle shown near the top of the route diagram. That stretch was the preserve of goods trains, diversions and occasional specials.

== Private Sidings ==
A siding was provided immediately south of the station for use by the Gamble Estate. It was small scale and was probably only used for agricultural traffic. It was in use in 1916 but seemed to have closed a few years later.

In 1930 a siding was provided for the contractors building the nearby East Lancashire Road. It had been removed by 28 May 1934 when the road building contract had been completed.

Preceding station	Disused railways	Following station
Gerards Bridge; Line and station closed	London and North Western Railway; St Helens Canal and Railway	Crank Halt; Line and station closed
