= Billinge Hill =

Hill in Merseyside, England

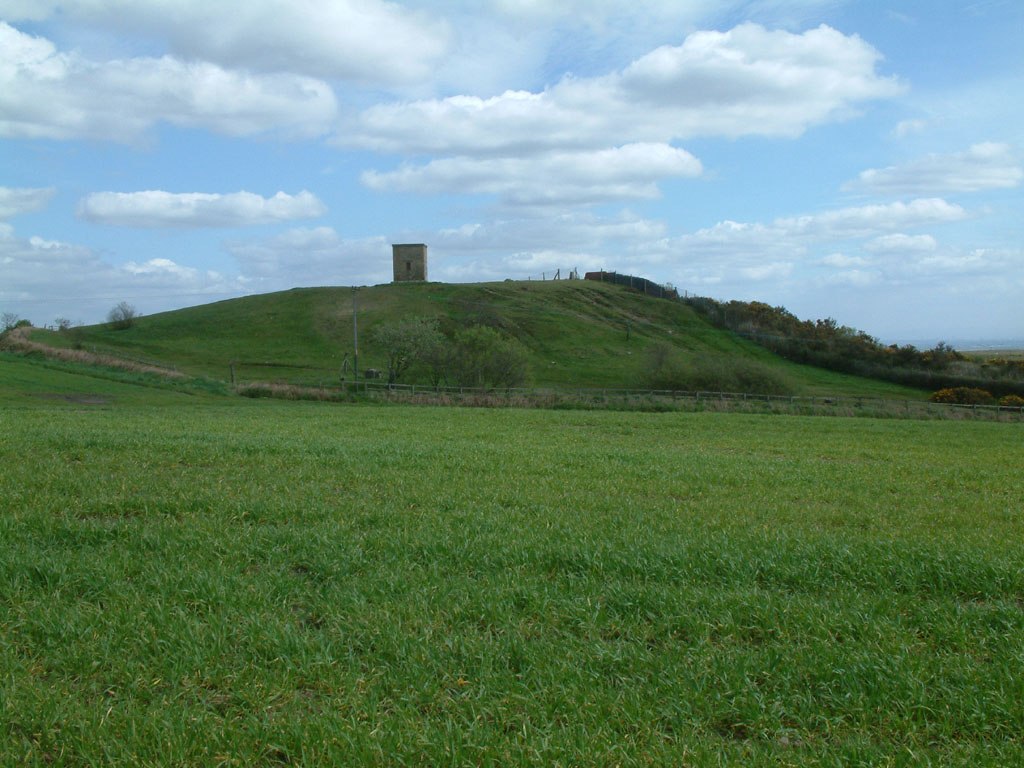
- Billinge Hill with its summit tower

Highest point
- Elevation: 179 m (587 ft)
- Prominence: 155 m (509 ft)
- Parent peak: Winter Hill
- Listing: Marilyn
- Coordinates: 53°30′26″N 2°43′04″W

Geography
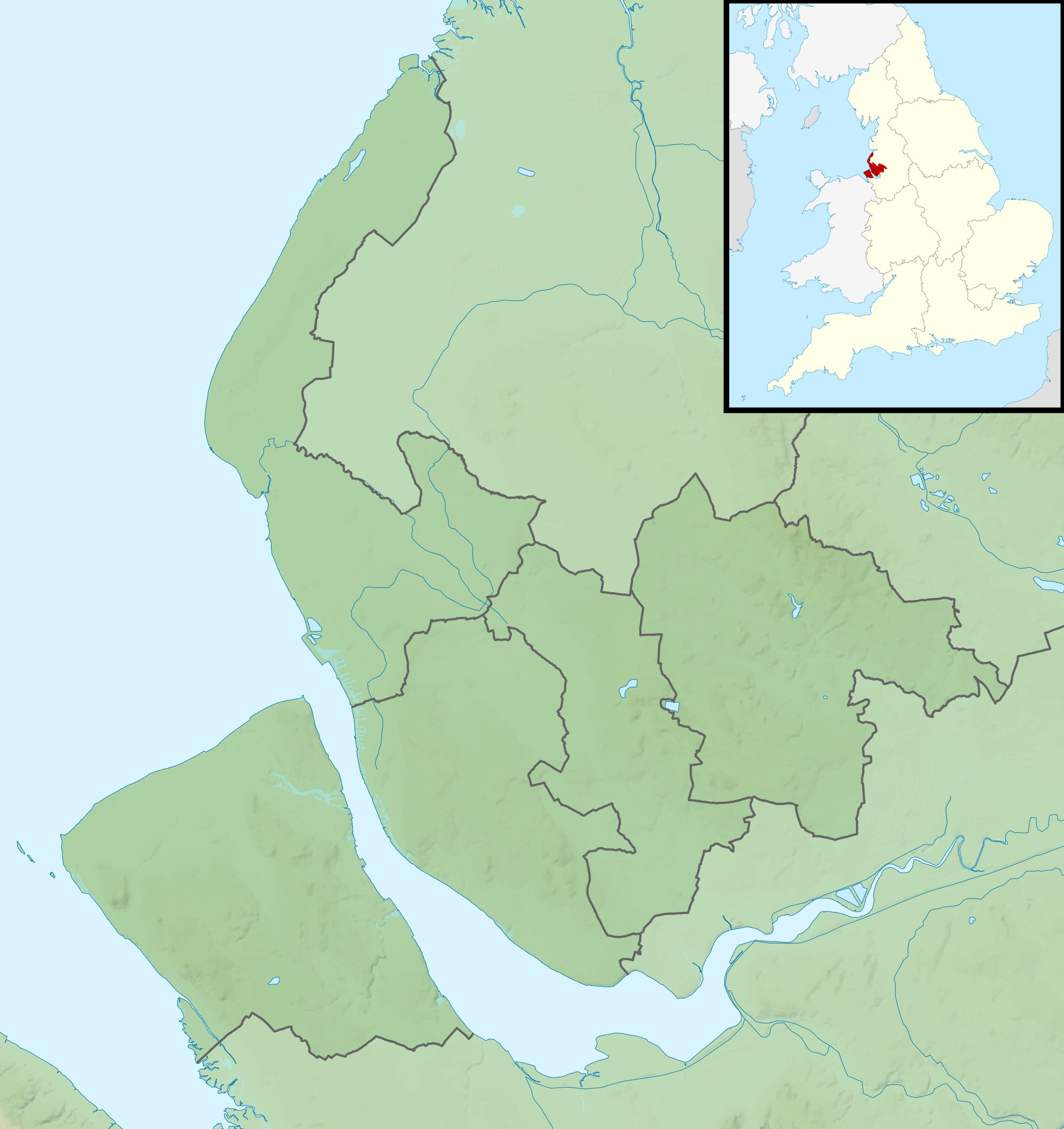
- Location within Merseyside
- Location: Billinge, Merseyside, England
- OS grid: SD525014
- Topo map: OS Landranger 108

Billinge Hill is in the Metropolitan Borough of St Helens in North West England. With a maximum elevation of 179 m (587 ft), it is the highest point of Merseyside. It lies in Billinge, within the historic county boundaries of Lancashire, and it is one of the 176 hills graded as a Marilyn in England.

A beacon tower is at the summit. Built as a summerhouse to Winstanley Hall in the 18th century, it was used for the Year 2000 celebrations. Most fireworks displays for miles around can be seen from the summit and people often gather there in small numbers to watch displays over the towns of Wigan and St Helens and the local village of Rainford. Over the years it has been covered in graffiti which was recently cleaned off and the metal panels restricting access to the inside of the beacon have been painted black.

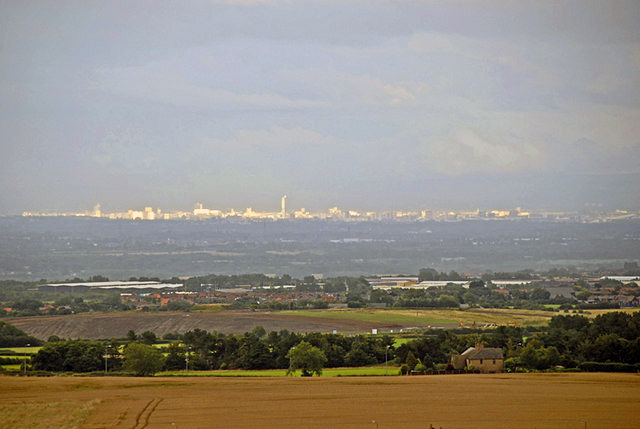
Greater Manchester from Billinge Hill.

Nearby to the north-west are several large transmitter masts which take advantage of the height and relative isolation of the land. The views are fairly extensive, notably to the southwest where, when clear, the mountains of Snowdonia, in Wales, can be seen and to the northeast Winter Hill can be seen. Looking east one sees Manchester and the Derbyshire Peak District. On a clear day, it is possible to see Blackpool Tower just over 25 miles (40 kilometres) away, the town of St. Helens and the Widnes–Runcorn bridge. Depending on the conditions and direction it is facing, the telescope at Jodrell Bank can be seen to the southeast, also just over 25 miles (40 kilometres) away.

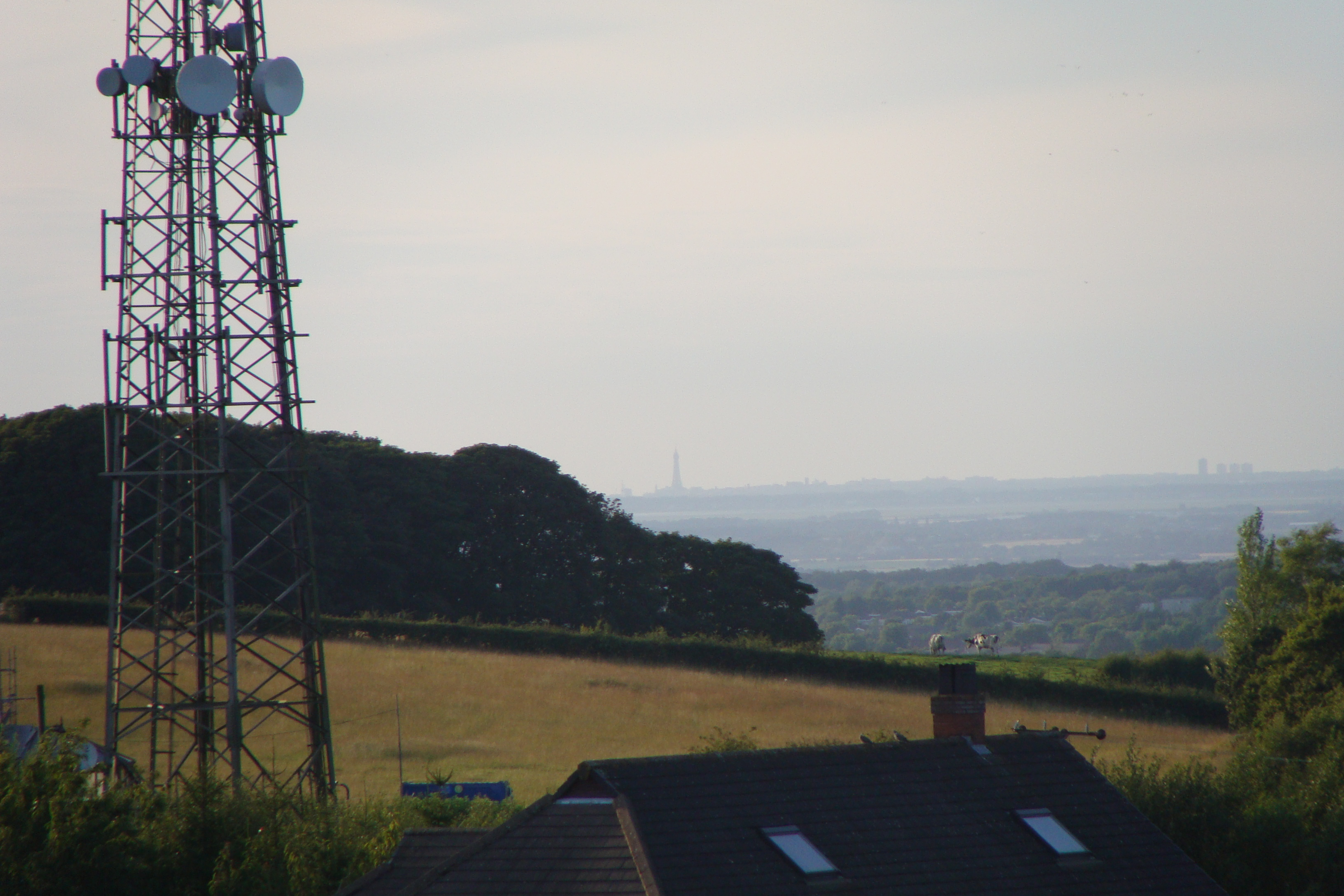
Blackpool Tower (visible on the horizon) from Billinge Hill.

Billinge Hill was also used by the Royal Observer Corps, and there was a bunker at the site, 60 yards (55 metres) west of and below the beacon. The beacon itself was used for aircraft observation during and after the war. The bunker would have been used to monitor the location of nuclear blasts and the resulting fallout over Lancashire in the event of nuclear war. The post opened in January 1960 and closed in October 1968.
