= Winstanley, Greater Manchester =

Coordinates: 53.5229°N 2.6772°W

Winstanley
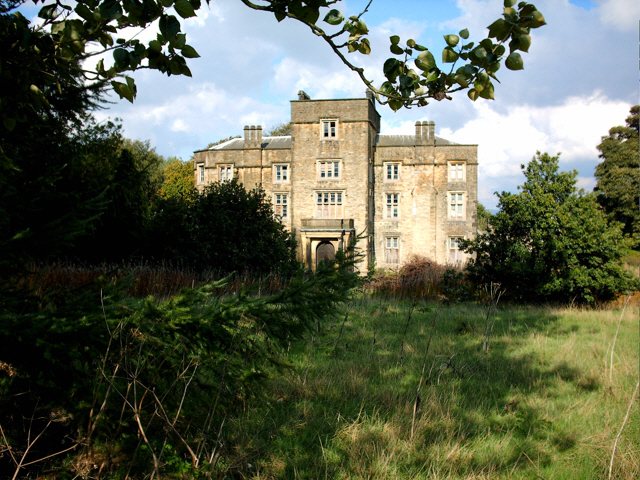
- Winstanley Hall

- Location within Greater Manchester
- Population: 11,264 (2011 Census)
- OS grid reference: SD531051
- Metropolitan borough: Wigan
- Metropolitan county: Greater Manchester
- Region: North West
- Country: England
- Sovereign state: United Kingdom
- Post town: WIGAN
- Postcode district: WN3
- Dialling code: 01942
- Police: Greater Manchester
- Fire: Greater Manchester
- Ambulance: North West
- UK Parliament: Makerfield

Winstanley is a suburb of Wigan in the Metropolitan Borough of Wigan, in Greater Manchester, England. Historically in Lancashire, the area had a population of 15,849, reducing at the 2011 census to 11,264.

== Transport ==
Train services to Wigan, Manchester and Kirkby are available at the nearby Pemberton railway station. The main road in the Winstanley area is the A571 (St.Helens to Wigan). Nearby is the A49, which gives access to the M6 motorway.

== Local schools ==
- Highfield St. Matthew's CofE Primary School
- Marus Bridge Primary School
- St. Aidan's Catholic Primary School, Wigan
- Winstanley Community Primary School
- Winstanley College
- Hawkley Hall High School

== Adjacent places ==
- Billinge 'Chapel End'
- Billinge 'Higher End'
- Orrell
- Pemberton

== History ==
Winstanley was formerly a township in the parish of Wigan, in 1866 Winstanley became a separate civil parish, on 1 April 1924 the parish was abolished to form Billinge and Winstanley. In 1921 the parish had a population of 564.

== See also ==
- Listed buildings in Billinge and Winstanley
