= Claire Anderson (DJ) =

English radio DJ

Claire Anderson is an English radio DJ, television presenter and voice-over artist. She was the presenter of the Sony-nominated The Late Lounge when it was broadcast on Jazz FM, from 2009 until 2016. She now presents it in its streaming-only format. She also remains the station voice.

Anderson began as a DJ on Whiston Hospital Radio in Whiston, Merseyside. A year later, she joined Rock FM and went on to present radio shows across England, including Ocean FM, Power FM, Wave 105 and BBC Radio Solent (2009–2012).

She became a full-time voice-over artist in 2001, becoming the voice of MTV UK & Ireland shortly thereafter.

She has also presented several television shows — including Channel 4's Scientific Eye, ITV's House of Fun and Channel 5's The Mag — and was a showbiz correspondent for Sky.

Her timeslot on Jazz FM was weekdays from 10pm to midnight.

== Personal life ==
Anderson was educated at Rainford High School in Merseyside, and lives in Southampton.
