= Gerards Bridge railway station =

Former railway station in England

Gerards Bridge

General information
- Location: St Helens, St Helens; England
- Coordinates: 53.462481°N 2.730809°W
- Grid reference: SJ516965
- Platforms: Two

Other information
- Status: Disused

History
- Original company: St Helens Canal and Railway
- Pre-grouping: London and North Western Railway

Key dates
- 1 February 1858: Opened
- 1 August 1905: Closed
Location

Gerards Bridge railway station was on the St Helens to Rainford Junction then Ormskirk line immediately north of Haresfinch Road in St Helens, England. It opened on 3 February 1858 and closed on 1 August 1905. Remnants of the line through the station survive, leading to Pilkington's Cowley Hill site, though in September 2015 the tracks were out of use.

== Services ==
The December 1895 timetable showed six "Down" trains to Rainford Junction and five "Up" to St Helens Monday-to-Friday, with an extra train in each direction on Saturdays.No trains called at Gerards Bridge on Sundays.

Preceding station	Disused railways	Following station
St Helens Central; Line closed, station open	London and North Western Railway; St Helens Canal and Railway	Moss Bank; Line and station closed

== Sources ==
- Pixton, Bob (1996), The Archive Photographs Series Widnes and St Helens Railways, The Chalford Publishing Company, ISBN 0 7524 0751 1
