= Crank Caverns =

Disused underground quarries in Merseyside, England

Coordinates: 53.491°N 2.737°W

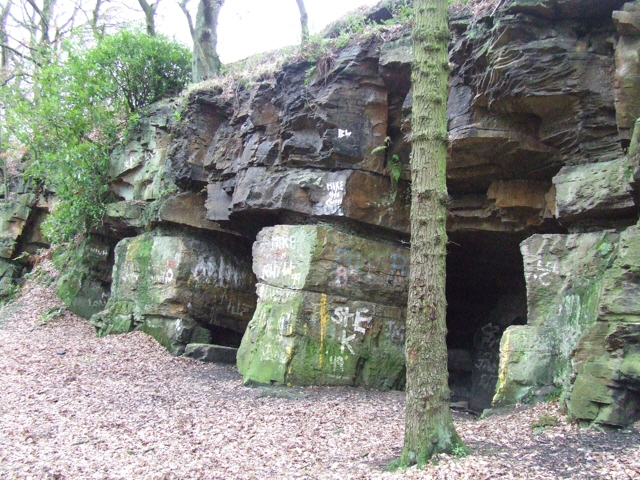
Entrance to the caverns

Crank Caverns is the common name of the remains of the Rainford Delph Quarry near Crank in St. Helens, Merseyside, England. It is a vast network of old tunnels and caverns, with very little known about the owners or workers of the tunnels. It appears that the main portals are much newer than the deeper tunnels found behind the tight squeeze through the gated entrance. Information in the St. Helens local history archives states that sandstone quarrying began here as early as 1700. The 1840s Ordnance Survey refers to the quarry as Rainford Old Delph. The woodland surrounding the caverns was used as a game reserve by the Earl of Derby until 1939, when they became a storage facility for ammunition for the anti-aircraft position at Crank. Today, Crank Caverns are still physically accessible from a nearby public footpath, but is on privately owned land and is technically trespassing. It is still a draw for generations of curious locals who wish to explore, many having heard the numerous local myths and legends from an early age.

== Caverns ==
The mines are an example of pillar and stall mining, with the roof having support provided by pillars of stone left in place when mining was taking place. There are two sets of caverns, the first and most noticeable caves have seven portals and lead down into a large cavern. To the back and to the left of this was a roadway which was sealed in 1948. Beyond the roadway is an extensive network of tunnels, with access being possible through what is now a filled in entrance in a small patch of woodland just behind Crossdale Way, Moss Bank. The Stork Inn in the nearby town of Billinge may have access to this vast network through their cellar. The other set of caves lies north west of the first set. These caves lie at the bottom of a deep ditch. The largest is a short cavern called the "Elephant Cave". This has a ledge which is difficult to climb without ropes but is said to go deeper into the main roadway. The Mousey is a smaller gated cavern next to the Elephant cave which leads into a much deeper and older set of tunnels. The entrance to the deeper set of tunnels is called "The Mousey", due to it being an extremely tight crawl. It is gated with "Hell" written on the top and requires you to crawl on your belly through for appropriately 2-3 minutes before it opens up. The tunnels that are in the deepest section of this entrance are much older and feature long and vast stalactites and stalagmites compared to the Pillar and Stall method seen in the newer caverns. There is a stone-lined shaft that has been filled in many times by the farmer. The infill from this shaft blocks access to further tunnels in the Mousey area. The shaft infill can be seen where the newer Pillar and Stall technique splits off to the older tunnels. Many people have tried to dig through here but none have succeeded, the mixture stone, mud and clay has appeared to create a natural aggregate and makes it near impossible to move. Access to the older caverns is now a much tighter squeeze due to more recent landfill. They are extremely dangerous and prone to collapse. They are still accessible as of October 2023.

== Myths and legends ==
There are numerous myths and legends associated with the caverns. The most well known is that during the English Reformation, local Catholics being persecuted by King Henry VIII (1491–1547) took shelter in the caverns and conducted secret mass there, but mining on the quarry only began in about 1730. Some stories report the caves running to, amongst other places, Up Holland in Lancashire, Church of St Mary, Lowe House in St. Helens and Moss Bank in St. Helens, another stated that there was in fact a tunnel running some seven miles from St Helens Town Hall to Crank Caverns in order to conduct 'secret' hangings.

"Vicious dwarves" were once rumoured to inhabit a labyrinth of caverns in Crank. In the late 18th century four children decided to explore the sandstone caverns and vanished. One child survived and told a story about small old men with beards who killed his three friends and chased him. The petrified child stumbled over human bones in the caves and finally managed to scramble through an opening to the surface as a hand was grabbing at his ankle. The authorities were concerned because a number of people had gone missing in the area near the cave entrances. Two heavily armed soldiers descended into the caverns with torches and claimed that they not only found a heap of human bones, they also found the ruins of an ancient church of some unknown denomination. The interior of the church was lit by three large candles and grotesque gargoyles formed part of an altar. Throughout the exploration of the underground, the soldiers said they felt as if they were being watched, and also heard voices speaking in an unknown language. One report said that a child's head was found in a cave, along with evidence of cannibalism. After a second investigation, the caves either collapsed or gunpowder was used to seal them.
