= Old Mill Lane railway station =

Former railway station in England

Old Mill Lane

General information
- Location: Rainford, St Helens; England
- Coordinates: 53.490430°N 2.767159°W
- Grid reference: SJ492995
- Platforms: Two

Other information
- Status: Disused

History
- Original company: London and North Western Railway
- Pre-grouping: London and North Western Railway
- Post-grouping: London, Midland and Scottish Railway

Key dates
- 1 August 1906: Opened
- 18 June 1951: Closed to passengers
Location

Old Mill Lane railway station was on the St Helens to Rainford Junction then Ormskirk line south of Rainford, England. It opened on 1 August 1906 and closed on 18 June 1951. The line through the station closed in 1964 and has since been lifted. The station has been demolished.

== Services ==
In July 1922 thirteen "Up" (southbound) trains called at the station on weekdays, with an extra on Saturday evenings. All originated at Ormskirk, several with connections from Southport. Ten Up trains called on Sundays. All trains continued all stations to St Helens. The "Down" (northbound) service was similar.

The trains all consisted of "Motor Cars - One class only". Please note that 'Motor Cars' then did not have their modern meaning, but consisted of a single railway coach joined to a dedicated steam locomotive. Their generic type is summarised in L&YR railmotors. Photographs appear in Bob Pixton's work on the line.

In 1951 the Up service consisted of five trains on weekdays with three extra on Saturdays, all stations to St Helens. The rolling stock was "Third Class Only". No trains called on Sundays. The Down service was similar.

All local trains plying between Ormskirk and St Helens called at Rainford Junction, entailing a reverse. None used the 'direct line' between Bushey Lane Junction and Randle Junction which formed the third side of the triangle shown near the top of the route diagram. That stretch was the preserve of goods trains, diversions and occasional specials.

== Private sidings ==
To modern eyes a surprising amount of industry was once served by the railway at Old Mill Lane, the scale can be gauged in the aerial photographs in the Disused Railways website linked below.

Rainford Pottery was served by a siding from 1868 until the 1950s when the traffic was lost to road.

Pilkington's had two sidings, a yard turning northeast from south of the station and a siding to Rainford Sand Wash running parallel to the tracks just north of the station. Sand was a key ingredient in St Helens' glassmaking industry. This sand wash was served over the years by narrow gauge railways, aerial ropeways and lorries.

| Preceding station | Disused railways | Following station |
|---|---|---|
| Crank Halt; Line and station closed | London and North Western Railway; St Helens Canal and Railway | Rookery; Line and station closed |
