= Higher End =

Coordinates: 53.5233°N 2.7154°W

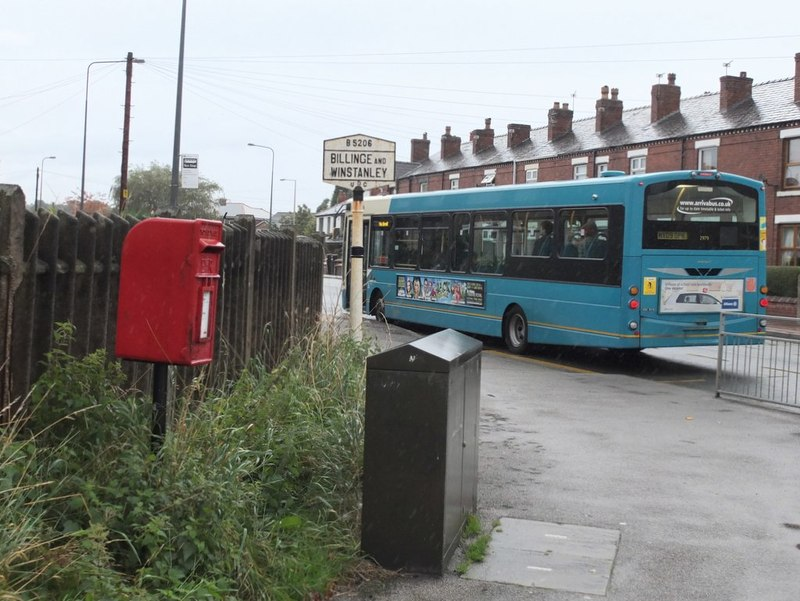

- Location within Greater Manchester
- OS grid reference: SD526032
- Metropolitan borough: Wigan
- Metropolitan county: Greater Manchester
- Region: North West
- Country: England
- Sovereign state: United Kingdom
- Post town: Wigan
- Postcode district: WN5
- Dialling code: 01695/01942/01744
- Police: Greater Manchester
- Fire: Greater Manchester
- Ambulance: North West
- UK Parliament: Makerfield

Higher End, also known as Billinge Higher End, is an area of the Metropolitan Borough of Wigan, Greater Manchester, England.

== Governance ==
Billinge was a civil parish lying within the historic county boundaries of Lancashire. On 2 February 1837 it was divided into two townships, Billinge Chapel End and Billinge Higher End when the Wigan poor law union was formed merging the workhouse provision of 20 parishes in the Wigan area. In 1866 Billinge Higher End became a separate civil parish. The poor law union built the Wigan Poor Law Infirmary in 1906 which became Billinge Hospital. In 1872 Billinge Local Board of Health was established for the area of these two townships and two detached parts of Winstanley township (one known as Blackley Hurst and the other situated in the Carr Mill area, both lying within the area of Billinge Chapel End township).

In 1894, the area of the local board (together with the remaining area of Winstanley township) became Billinge Urban District. On 1 April 1924, the parish was abolished to form "Billinge and Winstanley", and in 1927 the urban district was renamed Billinge and Winstanley Urban District. In 1921, the parish had a population of 2,396.

In 1974, most of Billinge Higher End (excepting Billinge Hill), and most of Winstanley, became part of the Metropolitan Borough of Wigan in Greater Manchester, while Billinge Chapel End (including the remainder of Winstanley) became part of St Helens Metropolitan Borough in Merseyside.

== Geography ==
Adjacent places include:

- Billinge
- Crank
- Orrell
- Winstanley

Billinge Higher End encompasses Longshaw.

== Communal facilities ==
- Winstanley College

== Transport ==
Higher End sits on the B5206. Train services to Wigan town centre, Manchester and Kirkby are available from the nearby Orrell railway station.

== See also ==
- Listed buildings in Billinge and Winstanley
