= Billinge and Winstanley Urban District =

Former local government district in North-West England

Coordinates: 53.508°N 2.677°W

Billinge and Winstanley Billinge (1872–1927)
- Local government district (1872–1894); Urban district (1894–1974)
- Area
  - 1911: 4,596 acres (18.60 km^{2})
  - 1961: 4,596 acres (18.60 km^{2})
- Population
  - 1901: 4,232
  - 1971: 11,389
- History
  - Created: 16 December 1872 (local government district); 31 December 1894 (urban district)
  - Abolished: 31 March 1974
  - Succeeded by: Metropolitan Borough of St Helens; Metropolitan Borough of Wigan
  - HQ: Billinge
- Contained within
  - County Council: Lancashire

Billinge (from 1927 Billinge and Winstanley) was, from 1872 to 1974, a local government district in the administrative county of Lancashire, England.

The district was created in 1872 as a local government district, governed by a local board. It covered three separate parishes: Billinge Chapel End, Billinge Higher End and Winstanley. These had all previously been townships within the larger parish of Wigan, but as they appointed their own overseers of the poor they had each become separate civil parishes in 1866 with the passing of the Poor Law Amendment Act 1866. When sanitary districts were established in August 1872 the three parishes were briefly included in the Wigan Rural Sanitary District. A public meeting was held at the Stork Inn at Billinge Chapel End on 24 October 1872 where it was decided that the three parishes would form a group called the Billinge Local Government District, allowing them to establish their own board and become a separate urban sanitary district, independent of the Wigan Rural Sanitary District. The Local Government Board confirmed the creation of the district on 16 December 1872.

Under the Local Government Act 1894 (56 & 57 Vict. c. 73), local boards became urban districts with effect from 31 December 1894. The 1894 Act also created parish councils for rural parishes, but the three parishes in the Billinge district were all classed as urban parishes and so did not have their own parish councils, being instead directly administered by Billinge Urban District Council. The three parishes were merged into a single parish called Billinge and Winstanley on 1 April 1924, covering the same area as the urban district, although the former parish areas continued to be used as wards for the election of councillors. The urban district was renamed Billinge and Winstanley on 5 May 1927.

The urban district was abolished in 1974 by the Local Government Act 1972. It was one of only eleven urban districts or boroughs in England to be split between new districts under the 1972 Act. The Billinge Chapel End ward became a parish again, and was included in the Metropolitan Borough of St Helens in Merseyside. No successor parish was created for rest of the urban district, covering Billing Higher End and Winstanley wards, which became part of the Metropolitan Borough of Wigan in Greater Manchester.
