= Henry Sephton =

English mason and architect

Henry Sephton (c. 1686 – 2 June 1756) was the leading mason and architect in St Helens, Lancashire during the second quarter of the eighteenth century, the architect-builder of Ince Blundell Hall and Halton Court House, Halton, Cheshire (now a hotel), who worked in both classical and Gothic revival styles, including the expansion of Prescot Parish Church.
