= Crank, Merseyside =

Coordinates: 53.493°N 2.750°W

Crank
- Village
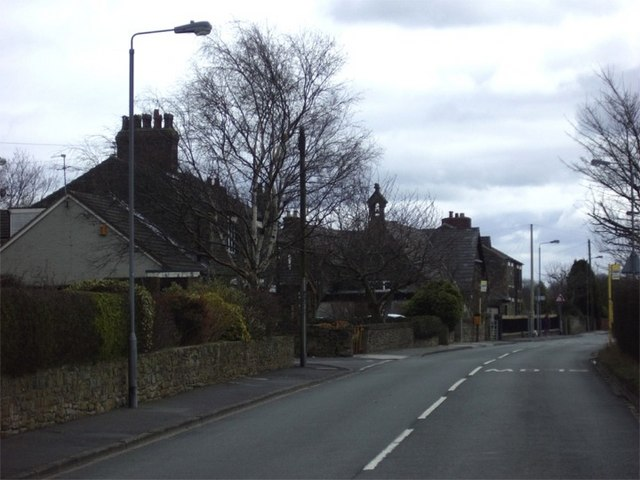

- Location within Merseyside
- OS grid reference: SJ5045799710
- Civil parish: Rainford
- Metropolitan borough: St Helens
- Metropolitan county: Merseyside
- Region: North West
- Country: England
- Sovereign state: United Kingdom
- Post town: ST. HELENS
- Postcode district: WA11
- Dialling code: 01744
- Police: Merseyside
- Fire: Merseyside
- Ambulance: North West
- UK Parliament: St Helens North

Crank is a village near Rainford, Merseyside, England in the Metropolitan Borough of St Helens. It is in the civil parish of Rainford.

Within the boundaries of the historic county of Lancashire, it is known locally for its ghost stories 'The White Rabbit of Crank' and 'Crank Caverns'.

The village has one public house - The Red Cat.

== See also ==
- Crank Caverns
