= Winstanley Hall =

Listed building in Greater Manchester, England

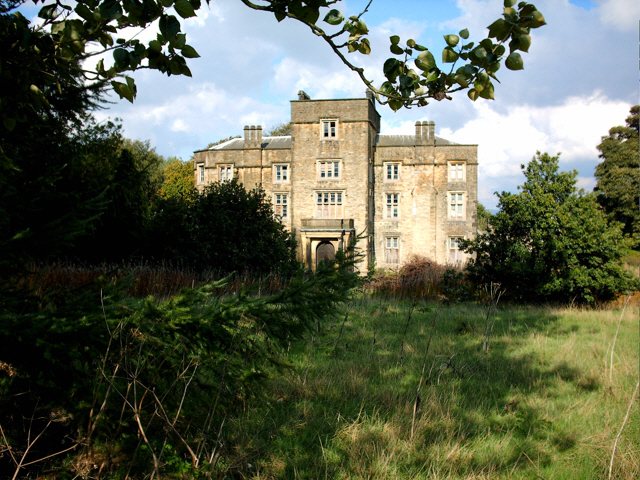
- Winstanley Hall in 2006

- Location within Greater Manchester

General information
- Architectural style: Tudor
- Location: Winstanley, Greater Manchester, England
- Coordinates: 53.522389°N 2.687351°W
- Years built: c. 1573
- Renovated: 1811–19, 1843

Technical details
- Floor count: 2 / 3

Design and construction
- Designations

Listed Building – Grade II*
- Official name: Winstanley Hall
- Designated: 23 August 1966
- Reference no.: 1287365

Scheduled monument
- Official name: Winstanley moated site and five fishponds
- Designated: 28 September 1993
- Reference no.: 1007600

Winstanley Hall is a late 16th-century house in Winstanley, a suburb of Wigan, Greater Manchester, England. It is a Grade II* listed building and a scheduled monument. Originally built for the Winstanley family, it is one of only three Tudor buildings in the borough. Having stood derelict for several decades, it is listed by Historic England as a Heritage at Risk site, and as of 2026 the hall is the subject of a planning application linking its restoration to the construction of new housing on the surrounding estate.

== History ==
The hall was built c. 1573 for the Winstanley family of Winstanley, who were lords of the manor since at least 1252 and may have been responsible for building the moat on the site. The Winstanleys owned the hall until 1596, when the estate was sold to James Bankes, a London goldsmith and banker. Winstanley Hall has three storeys and has a date stone with a date of 1584, but this is not in situ so may not provide an accurate date for the construction of the house. Extra blocks were added in the 17th and 18th centuries. Further and extensive alterations were made in 1811–19 by Lewis Wyatt in a Jacobean style. He moved the entrance to the left flank of the hall and replaced the original entrance with a window. The final additions to the hall were made in 1843 when a two-storey extra wing was added. To the south, on lands belonging to the hall, is a small stone building which was used to house bears that provided entertainment for the hall's guests. The Winstanley family also owned the Braunstone Hall estate in Leicestershire.

The Bankes family retained ownership of the hall until the 21st century when it was sold for private development. The hall had been kept in good condition until the 1960s when the family moved out; it was last occupied in the 1980s. As the building decayed and the cost of maintaining the hall was too much for the family, it was sold on in 2000 with 10 acres (4 ha) of land. It had been reported in 2019 that the new owner intended to develop the hall into private flats, and that refurbishment was held up due to problems with planning permission, although it had also been reported that no application for planning permission had been submitted.

As of January 2022, Winstanley Hall was in poor condition and at risk of collapse, with a leaking roof, collapsed floors, and widespread dry rot. Historic England lists it on the Heritage at Risk Register as being in "very bad" condition and at "immediate risk of further rapid deterioration or loss of fabric".

In May 2025, it was announced that the current owner, Kingswood Homes, intended to restore the hall and convert it into homes. In March 2026, it was reported that the developer had submitted plans to Wigan Council proposing that the restoration of Winstanley Hall would be funded through the construction of new housing, a proposal that attracted several hundred objections.

== See also ==
- Grade II* listed buildings in Greater Manchester
- Listed buildings in Billinge and Winstanley
- Scheduled monuments in Greater Manchester
