= Rainford =

Village in Merseyside, England

Coordinates: 53.503°N 2.783°W

- Village
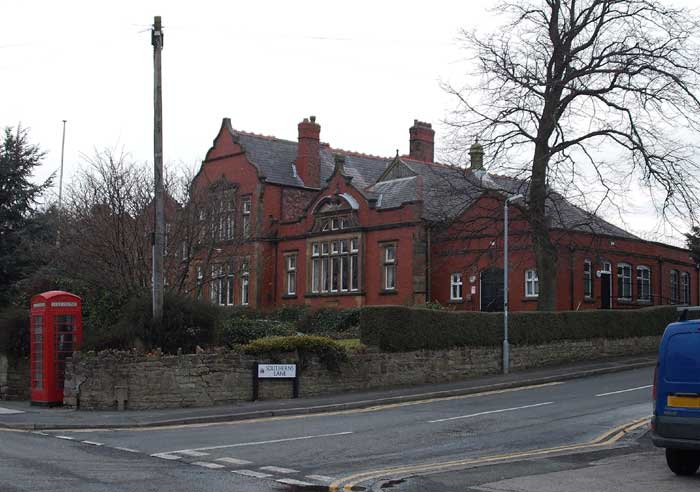
- Rainford Council Offices

- Location within Merseyside
- Population: 7,779 (2011 Census)
- OS grid reference: SD481009
- Civil parish: Rainford
- Metropolitan borough: St Helens
- Metropolitan county: Merseyside
- Region: North West
- Country: England
- Sovereign state: United Kingdom
- Post town: ST. HELENS
- Postcode district: WA11
- Dialling code: 01744
- Police: Merseyside
- Fire: Merseyside
- Ambulance: North West
- UK Parliament: St Helens North
- Website: rainfordparishcouncil.com

Rainford is a village and civil parish in the Metropolitan Borough of St Helens, Merseyside, England, 5 miles (8.0 km) north of St Helens. At the 2011 Census, the population was 7,779.

Within the boundaries of the historic county of Lancashire, the earliest record of the village was in 1189.

== History ==
Rainford is well known for its industrial past when it was a major manufacturer of clay smoking pipes. The nearby coal mines became worked out and closed before the Second World War.

Until the mid-1960s, it was also a location for sand excavation, for use in the glass factories of St Helens.

The Rookery is a large 17th-century manor house which was formerly a school and workhouse.

== Geography ==
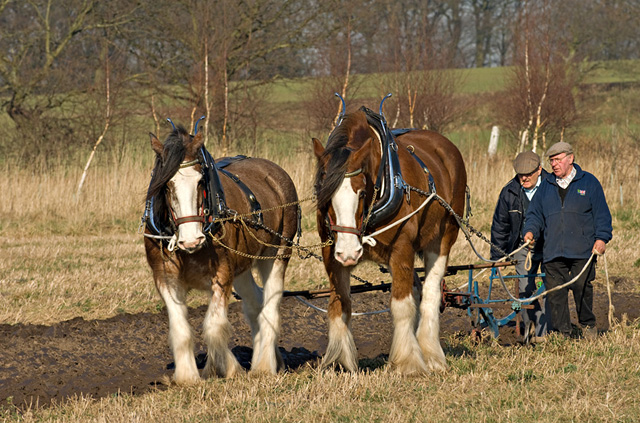
Traditional ploughing at Fir Tree Farm

Rainford lies on a fertile agricultural plain and is effectively an urban island surrounded by large scale farming, mainly arable, but with some livestock herds.

The village consists of two main sections – the main body of the village, centred on the parish church; and Rainford Junction, a smaller settlement which has grown up around Rainford railway station. The two parts of the village are separated by a band of farmland, although they come close to meeting at the village's north-western end.

There are three smaller villages which are near to Rainford – King's Moss to the east, Crawford to the north-east and Crank to the south-east.

== Industry ==
Agriculture has been a constant since time immemorial around Rainford.

From the mid-17th century Rainford was a centre of clay pipe manufacture. C.J. Berry speculates that this may have been due to the prevalence of Catholics in the industry, and Rainford's history of Nonconformism and religious tolerance, in contrast to the persecution Catholics received in much of the country in the era. The type of clay used was only generally found in Devon and Cornwall, and was thus imported. The industry in the area peaked during the period c. 1800–40, in which there was little else in the village besides the clay pipe industry. Whilst other towns in the area made pipes, the industry in Rainford started earlier and continued longer. The last two pipe manufacturers retired in 1956. The clay industry continued in the area thereafter, though, with the Rainford Potteries (established 1890) making earthenware drainpipes from local clay.

== Transport ==
Rainford Junction is so called because it contained the junction between the Liverpool & Bury Railway's Skelmersdale Branch and St Helens Railway, and is now home to the village's only railway station. The railway station is on the Headbolt Lane – Manchester Victoria via Wigan line. Passengers wishing to travel to Liverpool must change at Headbolt Lane onto the Merseyrail electrified line. Rainford Village railway station, located on Cross Pit Lane, served the centre of the village from 1858 until closure in 1951. It was located on the line to St Helens Shaw Street railway station.

Rainford sits alongside the A570 (Rainford Bypass), a dual carriageway constructed in the late 1930s to supplant the original route running through the village centre. The A570 connects at one end to the East Lancashire Road (A580) and, at the other end, the M58 motorway. This results in excellent road links, and the village therefore has many inhabitants who commute to the nearby cities of Liverpool and Manchester and to St Helens.

There are bus services in Rainford; as at November 2015 Arriva North West operate service 38 which connects the village and Rainford Junction to St Helens every 30 minutes. Evening and Sunday journeys on this service are numbered 356 and go via Crank approximately hourly. HTL Buses operate the 152 from St Helens to Rainford with a few services extended to Ormskirk. The 157 goes to Ashton and is currently operated by Cumfybus, and a new service announced by Lancashire County Council will operate from Ormskirk, through to Burscough and Skelmersdale, terminating in Rainford. This service will also serve Rainford High School.

== Culture and recreation ==
Rainford has many noted public houses, including the Bottle and Glass, the Junction Hotel, the Star Inn, the Derby Arms, the Golden Lion, and the Eagle and Child.

Annually the village has a music festival called Picnic in the Park; profits benefit Rainford Rangers, Rainford Cricket Club, Rainford Tennis Club, and the local Boys Brigade. The 2018 headline was John Coghlan (drummer)'s Quo. The 2019 headline was Carol Decker's T'Pau (band). 2020's event was postponed until 2021 due to the COVID-19 pandemic. 2021 was headlined by From The Jam, 2022 by Chesney Hawkes, and 2023 by Scouting For Girls

Rainford Silver Band is highly regarded, and has won many contests A 'walking day' takes place every year in June and a fairground is set up behind the Golden Lion public house, in which the silver band participate. A well-supported Rainford Show is held each year in early September in the old Rainford Urban District Council offices, with competitive classes for handicrafts, flowers, vegetables, floral art, and photography.

== Religion ==
Rainford currently has three functioning churches, with the Catholic, Church of England and United Reformed denominations having one each. There is also a nondenominational chapel in nearby Crank. The area has a history of Nonconformism, and was a stronghold of Recusancy from the Reformation until the Catholic Emancipation Act of 1832.

== Education ==
Rainford currently has three primary schools and a secondary school with a large sixth form. The primary schools are Rainford Brook Lodge County Primary School, Rainford C of E Primary School and Rainford Corpus Christi Catholic Primary School. The high school and sixth form operate jointly as Rainford High School, and serve to educate pupils not just from Rainford, but from throughout St. Helens and beyond. Many pupils continue to university each year.

== Sports ==
There is currently a golf course called the Northwest National Golf Club alongside the A570 dual carriageway. This course was opened in the summer of 2009 and contains 18 holes, a golf academy, restaurant and conference centre.

Rainford also has various sports clubs; A.F.C. Rainford, Rainford Tennis club 'Rainford Storm' Table Tennis Club, Rainford Rangers F.C., Rainford Eagles F.C., Rainford North End F.C., Rainford Walking Football Club “Eu Ex Tribus” (RWFC est.2022) and Rainford Cricket Club. A speedway training track was operational at some time in the early 1950s.

== Notable people ==
- Janice Long, BBC Radio 2 presenter
- Keith Chegwin, TV presenter and sometime singer
- William Birch, professional footballer
- Louis Bimpson, professional footballer
- Eric Frodsham, rugby league fullback, lived in the village
- James Bradshaw, dissenting minister, lived and preached in the village
- Marwan Koukash, owner of Salford RLFC, lives in Rainford
- Claire Anderson, attended Rainford High School
- Jack Wilson, one of the 3 remaining Lancaster Bomber Pilots.

== See also ==
- List of mining disasters in Lancashire
