= Billinge, Merseyside =

Coordinates: 53.4932°N 2.7129°W

Billinge
- Village
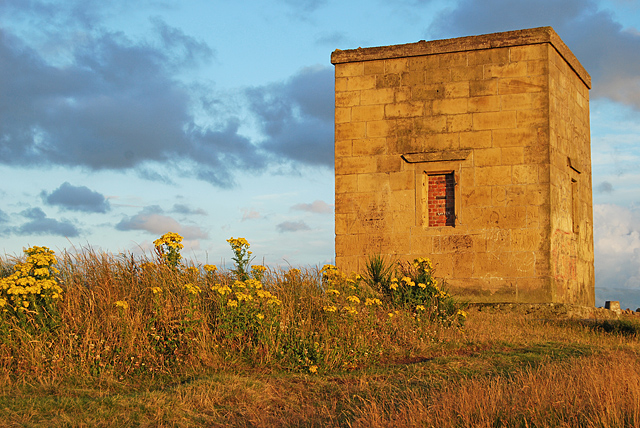
- The Beacon, Billinge Hill

- Location within Merseyside
- Population: 6,554 (2001 Census)
- OS grid reference: SJ528998
- Civil parish: Billinge Chapel End
- Metropolitan borough: St Helens
- Metropolitan county: Merseyside
- Region: North West
- Country: England
- Sovereign state: United Kingdom
- Post town: WIGAN
- Postcode district: WN5
- Dialling code: 01744
- Police: Merseyside
- Fire: Merseyside
- Ambulance: North West
- UK Parliament: St Helens North

Billinge is a village within the Metropolitan Borough of St Helens, Merseyside, England. It forms the larger part of the civil parish of Billinge Chapel End.

At the United Kingdom Census 2001, it had a population of 6,554.

Within the boundaries of the historic county of Lancashire, Billinge is located by road approximately 4.5 miles (7.2 km) southwest of Wigan (town centre) and 3.7 miles (5.9 km) northeast of St Helens (town centre).

== History ==
=== Etymology ===
The name Billinge like other similarly named settlements in North-West England comes from the name of the founding clan, Billingas, known to be the ruling clan of the Warini tribe (Werns) originating in today's Mecklenburg in Germany, closely tied to western Slavic tribes (Wends) from the area. Billinge dialect up until recent times well retained Anglo Saxon ancient words of deeply indo-european origin tied to words instantly recognisable to Slavic speakers. This also helps explain names such as Warrington (Warini town, see Varangians) and Wigan with Slavic ties dating back to 550 AD.

Earlier, due to pseudo etymology, the name Billinge was theorised to mean "(place at the) pointed hill", from Old English billa "ridge, bill of sword" and -ing "place at/people of the". The name was recorded as Bylnge in 1252.

== Governance ==
This township or civil parish lies within the historic county boundaries of Lancashire. It was in Wigan ecclesiastical parish (Deanery of Wigan) and-, therefore, in the Diocese of Liverpool, previously Chester. A prison once stood in the village called Tower Prison, and during the English Civil War, it was used by Parliamentarians to imprison Royalists soldiers, with one dying from typhus. In 1752, the prison was torn down and The Stork Hotel was built in its place. Parts of the prison are still preserved underneath the building with the old cells still intact. In recent years, however the pub was shut down and suffered a fire. There are now plans to convert it into apartments.

On 2 February 1837, with the commencement of the Wigan Poor Law Union, which merged the workhouses of 20 parishes in the Wigan area, the parish was divided into two separate townships, Billinge Chapel End and Billinge Higher End. In 1872 Billinge Local Board of Health was established for the area of these two townships and two detached parts of Winstanley township (one known as Blackley Hurst and the other situated in the Carr Mill area, both lying within the area of Billinge Chapel End township). In 1894 the area of the Local Board (together with the remaining area of Winstanley township) became Billinge Urban District. In 1927 the urban district was renamed Billinge and Winstanley Urban District. In 1974 the Billinge Higher End ward and most of Winstanley ward became part of the Metropolitan Borough of Wigan in Greater Manchester; the Billinge Chapel End area (including the two detached parts of Winstanley township) became part of the Metropolitan Borough of St Helens in Merseyside.

== Churches ==
Two of Billinge's churches are listed buildings. The Church of St Aidan (Grade II*) is in the Wigan Deanery, which is part of the Anglican Diocese of Liverpool. St Mary's Church (Grade II), built in 1828, is part of the Roman Catholic Archdiocese of Liverpool.

== Notable people ==
- Canon William Cadman, 19th century priest and evangelist
- Heather Frederiksen, multiple paralympic swimming champion
- Owen Farrell, England international professional rugby union player
- Claire Jackson (stage name Georgia Taylor), actress – Coronation Street & Holby City
- Ken Owen, drummer for extreme metal band Carcass
- Thérèse Coffey MP, Secretary of State for Health and Social Care and Deputy Prime Minister
- Colin Greenall, former professional footballer
- Carley Stenson, actress, UK Drama Hollyoaks
- Helen McCourt, murder victim
- Guy Keegan- drummer for The Railway Children and The Tansads
- Jonny Lomax, England and Great Britain professional rugby league player
- Leon Osman, footballer, Everton F.C.
- Richard D. Lewis, linguist and cross-cultural adviser

== See also ==
- Listed buildings in Billinge, Merseyside
- Billinge Hill
- Billinge Hospital (now closed)
- Billinge Urban District
- Higher End
