= Open Table Network =

Christian community for LGBT people and their allies

- Logo of Open Table Network, since 2016
- Abbreviation: OTN
- Formation: June 2008; 18 years ago
- Type: Charity
- Registration no.: 1193868
- Legal status: Charitable Incorporated Organisation
- Region served: England and Wales
- Director: Kieran Bohan
- Co-chairs: Revd Andrew Howorth; Dr Carol Joyner
- Website: opentable.lgbt

Open Table Network (OTN) is a Christian charity which supports church communities for LGBT people and their allies in England and Wales.

== Organisation ==
The Open Table Network is a Charitable Incorporated Organisation, registered by the Charity Commission on 19 March 2021, whose charitable object is the "promotion of equality and diversity, and the relief of those in need for the public benefit, particularly in the area of LGBTQIA+ equality in religious organisations in the UK". At the time of registration, there were 18 Open Table communities. According to the charity's annual report for 2023, there were 35 communities by the end of that year.

Kieran Bohan is Director since October 2023, having previously served as Coordinator of the Open Table Network. Bohan broadcast a reflection on Open Table as part of a BBC Radio 4 service led by Rachel Mann in September 2020. In May 2022, he and his partner celebrated the tenth anniversary of their civil partnership, the first in the UK to be celebrated in a religious building.

The co-chairs are Revd Andrew Howorth and Dr Carol Joyner.

Patrons of the charity are: Alex Clare-Young, John Bradbury, Archbishop Cherry Vann, Bishop Paul Bayes, John L. Bell, and Barbara Glasson.

== History ==
In June 2008, the first Open Table community was founded at St Bride's Church, Liverpool; by 2019, the network consisted of 17 communities in England and Wales. An article in the book Journeys in Grace and Truth, edited by Jayne Ozanne, describes the founding and history of Open Table. In Christianity, "open table" refers to the custom of offering communion to all baptised Christians regardless of denomination.

At the first planning meeting, someone said: 'Will it be "Open Table"?' When she explained that it means all are welcome, all can come as they are, we felt this was so important because we hear too many stories of people who feared exclusion, or were excluded, from their church community, who felt unheard or unable to express themselves or give their talents. So Open Table was born.

Open Table began as a fresh expression hosted by the Team Parish of St Luke in the City, Liverpool, which is served by the churches of St Bride, St Dunstan, and St Michael in the City. In 2019, Miranda Threlfall-Holmes, Team Rector at St Luke in the City, advocated offering control of church organisations to marginalised groups, such as LGBT Christians; she describes Open Table as an "electrifying" example of this idea working successfully in practice.

In 2016, Paul Bayes, Bishop of Liverpool until February 2022, called for changes in the Church of England's attitudes to lesbian and gay people; recalling to The Guardian a visit to the Open Table congregation in Liverpool, he said: "I saw their faithfulness as Christians, often in difficult circumstances, sometimes in trying to say who they are within the church. I want to make room for a congregation like Open Table." In 2019, Bayes described Open Table as "one of the fastest growing Church planting movements in England".

In 2018, Open Table Cambridge was established at Downing Place United Reformed Church, Cambridge. Gay Christian co-founder Alison Binney said she had "immediately felt safe to be myself" at the church. Asked about the exclusion of LGBT+ Christians from church life, she said: "I think sometimes people who feel unloved and frightened come from churches which say things like, 'We take the Bible seriously' as a way to justify exclusion. And perhaps it would be helpful for you to hear this: We take the Bible incredibly seriously too."

In 2019, Open Table successfully campaigned for the Home Office to grant Yew Fook Sam, a gay Malaysian, asylum for five years. The campaign started by Open Table and promoted by the Liverpool Echo gathered more than 5000 signatures to an online petition.

In 2020, the Open Table Network received a £15,000 grant from the National Lottery Community Fund to fund staff time and technology to help support members of OTN communities during the COVID-19 pandemic.

In 2021, Civil Society Consulting prepared a report for the Open Table Network, arguing that "LGBT Christians have been adversely affected by national lockdowns" and called for more support.

In November 2021, the Bishop of St Asaph Gregory Cameron blessed the civil partnership of Lee Taylor and Fabiano Da Silva Duarte at St Collen's Church in Llangollen. The ceremony was the first since blessing of same-sex couples was approved by the Church in Wales in September 2021. Kieran Bohan of the Open Table Network said: "It is heartwarming to see a bishop embrace a priest whose civil partnership he has just blessed."

In January 2023, the Church of England decided that same-sex couples could "give thanks" and "receive God's blessing" for their civil marriage or partnerships in church, but that Holy Matrimony continues "unchanged" to be between one man and one woman. Kieran Bohan said: "This is sad news. Other Christian denominations now welcome same-gender couples who wish to be joined in holy matrimony. We regret that England's own established church still denies LGBT+ people this equality."
