= Diocese of Liverpool =

Diocese of the Church of England

Coordinates: 53°23′51″N 2°58′23″W

Diocese of Liverpool Dioecesis Liverpolitana
- Coat of arms

Location
- Ecclesiastical province: York
- Archdeaconries: Liverpool, Knowsley and Sefton, St Helens and Warrington

Statistics
- Parishes: 211
- Churches: 257

Information
- Cathedral: Liverpool Cathedral
- Language: English

Current leadership
- Bishop: Ruth Worsley, Bishop of Wigan and Interim Bishop of Liverpool
- Suffragan: Ruth Worsley, Bishop of Wigan (interim bishop diocesan); Simon Robinson, Bishop of Warrington
- Archdeacons: Pete Spiers, Archdeacon of Knowsley and Sefton; Simon Fisher, Archdeacon of St Helens and Warrington; Miranda Threlfall-Holmes, Archdeacon of Liverpool

Website
- https://liverpoolcofe.org/

The diocese of Liverpool is a diocese of the Church of England in North West England. The diocese covers Merseyside north of the River Mersey, south-west Lancashire, western Greater Manchester, and part of northern Cheshire. Liverpool Cathedral is the seat of the bishop of Liverpool, currently vacant. The bishop is assisted by one suffragan bishop, the bishop of Warrington.

What is now the diocese of Liverpool was historically part of the diocese of Coventry and Lichfield, and became part of the newly created diocese of Chester in 1541. The diocese of Liverpool was established on 9 April 1880.

== Bishops ==
The diocese's House of Bishops comprises the diocesan Bishop of Liverpool (vacant since 31 July 2025), the suffragan Bishop of Warrington (vacant), and the honorary assistant bishop (since 1999) and pro-vice chancellor emeritus at Liverpool Hope University, Ian Stuart (a former Assistant Bishop of North Queensland.) Alternative episcopal oversight (for parishes in the diocese who reject the ministry of women priests) is provided by the provincial episcopal visitor (PEV) the Bishop of Beverley, Stephen Race. He is licensed as an honorary assistant bishop of the diocese in order to facilitate his work there.

On 28 February 2025, it was announced that Ruth Worsley was to become Interim Bishop of Liverpool (i.e. diocesan bishop ad interim) for a period of two years starting later in 2025; to facilitate this role, she was translated from Taunton to the vacant suffragan See of Wigan (becoming Bishop of Wigan) on 4 April 2025.

There are two retired bishops living in the diocese:

- Cyril Ashton, a retired former Bishop suffragan of Doncaster, has been a licensed as an honorary assistant bishop since his 2011 retirement to Lancaster, Lancashire (in Blackburn diocese, where he is also licensed.)
- Frank Sargeant, former Bishop at Lambeth lives in Salford, Greater Manchester (and is also licensed in that diocese.)

In May 2016, it was announced that Susan Goff, Suffragan Bishop of Virginia, had been licensed as an honorary assistant bishop (called "Assisting Bishop of Liverpool") in the diocese, as part of the companion link with the American Episcopalian Diocese of Virginia. In response, the Diocese of Akure, Nigeria, has indicated that they wish to end their part of the companion link.

== Pastoral reorganisation ==
The diocese is in the process of reorganising its parishes into larger units under the tagline 'Fit for Mission'. This occurred first in Wigan deanery, which now consists of one benefice and seven parishes where once there were twenty-nine. An independent report suggested that the impact on the spiritual life and financial health of the deanery has not been positive. Similar mergers have taken place in St Helens and West Derby (although these only included those parishes that did not opt out) and one is underway in Warrington. Other deaneries are at earlier stages of the process.

== Archdeaconries and deaneries ==
| Diocese | Archdeaconries | Rural Deaneries |
|---|---|---|
| Diocese of Liverpool | Archdeaconry of Liverpool | Deanery of Liverpool North and Walton |
| Diocese of Liverpool | Archdeaconry of Liverpool | Deanery of Liverpool South and Childwall |
| Diocese of Liverpool | Archdeaconry of Liverpool | Deanery of Toxteth and Wavertree |
| Diocese of Liverpool | Archdeaconry of Liverpool | Deanery of West Derby |
| Diocese of Liverpool | Archdeaconry of St Helens & Warrington | Deanery of St Helens |
| Diocese of Liverpool | Archdeaconry of St Helens & Warrington | Deanery of Warrington |
| Diocese of Liverpool | Archdeaconry of St Helens & Warrington | Deanery of Widnes |
| Diocese of Liverpool | Archdeaconry of St Helens & Warrington | Deanery of Winwick |
| Diocese of Liverpool | Archdeaconry of St Helens & Warrington | Deanery of Wigan |
| Diocese of Liverpool | Archdeaconry of Knowsley & Sefton | Deanery of Huyton |
| Diocese of Liverpool | Archdeaconry of Knowsley & Sefton | Deanery of North Meols |
| Diocese of Liverpool | Archdeaconry of Knowsley & Sefton | Deanery of Sefton North^{1} |
| Diocese of Liverpool | Archdeaconry of Knowsley & Sefton | Deanery of Sefton South^{2} |
| Diocese of Liverpool | Archdeaconry of Knowsley & Sefton | Deanery of Ormskirk |

^{1}named Sefton until 2012

^{2}named Bootle until 2017

== List of churches ==
=== Extra-parochial places ===
- Liverpool Cathedral Precinct (population 62): Liverpool Cathedral (1904–78)

=== Archdeaconry of Knowsley and Sefton ===
==== Deanery of Huyton ====
- Benefice and Parish of Earlsfield (population 12,007): St Mary's Church, Knowsley (1830, rebuilt 1844) --- St George's Church, Huyton (1958)
- Benefice and Parish of Huyton (population 12,400): St Michael's Church (medieval)
- Benefice and Parish of Huyton Quarry (population 9,497): St Gabriel's Church (1894)
- Benefice and Parish of Kirkby (population 40,554): St Chad's Church (medieval chapel to Walton, rebuilt 1766, 1871) --- St Martin's Church, Kirkby Southdene (1955, rebuilt 1964) --- St Andrew's Church, Tower Hill, Kirkby (1960s, rebuilt 2002) --- St Mark's Church, Northwood, Kirkby (1950s, closed 2016)
- Benefice and Parish of Prescot (population 14,526): St Mary's Church (medieval, rebuilt 1610) --- St Paul's Church (1956)
- Benefice and Parish of Roby (population 15,410): St Bartholomew's Church (1850, rebuilt 1875) --- Trinity Local Ecumenical Partnership, Page Moss (LEP 1991, began 1934 as Methodist church, rebuilt 1961)
- Benefice and Parish of West Derby St Luke and Stockbridge Village St Jude (population 17,263): St Luke's Church, West Derby (1948, rebuilt 1960) --- St Jude's Church, Stockbridge Village (1972, closed 2016)
- Benefice and Parish of Whiston (population 9,402): St Nicholas' Church (1846, rebuilt 1868)

==== Deanery of North Meols ====
- Benefice and Parish of Ainsdale (population 10,425): St John's Church (1882)
- Benefice and Parish of Birkdale St James (population 5,238): St James's Church (1857)
- Benefice and Parish of Birkdale St John (population 11,264): St John's Church (1890)
- Benefice and Parish of Birkdale St Peter (population 6,143): St Peter's Church (1871)
- Benefice of Kew (population 3,236): St Francis of Assisi's Church (1987, building 1997)
- Benefice of North Meols
  - Parish of Crossens (population 5,489): St John's Church (1837, rebuilt 1885)
  - Parish of North Meols (population 3,669): St Cuthbert's Church, Churchtown (medieval, rebuilt 1739)
  - Parish of St Stephen in the Banks (population 3,824): St Stephen's Church, Banks (1868, rebuilt 1897)
- Benefice and Parish of Southport All Saints (population 5,910): All Saints' Church (1870, rebuilt 1980)
- Benefice and Parish of Southport Christ Church (population 4,863): Christ Church (1821) --- St Andrew's Church (1872, closed 1976)
- Benefice and Parish of Southport Emmanuel (population 10,208): Emmanuel Church (1898)
- Benefice and Parish of Southport Holy Trinity (population 4,650): Holy Trinity Church (1837, rebuilt 1912)
- Benefice and Parish of Southport St Luke (population 3,811): St Luke's Church (1880)
- Benefice and Parish of Southport St Philip and St Paul (population 11,026): St Philip (and St Paul with Wesley) Local Ecumenical Partnership (1876, rebuilt 1887, LEP 2001) --- St Paul's Church (1864, closed 1980s)
- Benefice and Parish of Southport St Simon and St Jude with All Souls (population 8,496): SS Simon & Jude's Church (1895) --- All Souls' Church (pre-1914, closed 2006)

==== Deanery of Ormskirk ====
- Benefice and Parish of Aughton Christ Church (population 7,696): Christ Church (1867, parish church 1929)
- Benefice of Aughton St Michael and Bickerstaffe
  - Parish of Aughton St Michael (population 4,624): St Michael's Church (medieval) --- Cottage Lane Mission Room (1888, closed)
  - Parish of Bickerstaffe (population 1,625): Holy Trinity Church (1843)
- Benefice and Parish of Burscough Bridge (population 10,150): St John the Baptist's Church (1832) --- St Andrew's Church, New Lane (1903) --- St Cyprian's Mission Church, Hoscar (1767, closed C20th)
- Benefice of Halsall, Lydiate and Downholland
  - Parish of Halsall (population 1,799): St Cuthbert's Church (medieval)
  - Parish of Lydiate and Downholland (population 7,066): St Thomas' Church, Lydiate (1841, parish church 1871) --- St Catherine's Chapel, Lydiate (medieval, closed C16th)
- Benefice and Parish of Newburgh (population 1,093): Christ Church (1857)
- Benefice and Parish of Ormskirk (population 16,674): SS Peter & Paul's Church (medieval) --- St John the Divine's Chapel, Lathom (c. 1500)
- Benefice and Parish of Rainford (population 7,805): All Saints' Church (medieval chapel to Prescot, re-established c. 1700, rebuilt 1878)
- Benefice and Parish of Scarisbrick (population 3,405): St Mark's Church (1851, parish church 1869) --- Good Shepherd Mission Church (1907, closed 2022)
- Benefice and Parish of Skelmersdale St Paul (population 10,300): St Paul's Church (1776, parish church 1856, rebuilt 1906) --- Skelmersdale Ecumenical Centre Local Ecumenical Partnership (1960s, building 1973)
- Benefice and Parish of Up Holland and Dalton (population 33,583): St Thomas the Martyr's Church, Up Holland (medieval chapel to Wigan, parish church 1882) --- Church of Christ the Servant, Digmoor (1970) --- Oaks Church, Tanhouse, Skelmersdale (2004) --- St Michael & All Angels' Church, Dalton (1870, rebuilt 1877)
- Benefice and Parish of Westhead (population 2,005): St James's Church (1851)

==== Deanery of Sefton North ====
- Benefice and Parish of Aintree St Giles with St Peter (population 7,734): St Giles' Church (1938, rebuilt 1956) --- St Peter's Church (1846, rebuilt 1876, demolished 1999)
- Benefice and Parish of Blundellsands St Michael (population 3,699): St Michael's Church (1907, rebuilt 1931)
- Benefice and Parish of Blundellsands St Nicholas (population 8,391): St Nicholas' Church (1874)
- Benefice of Formby Holy Trinity and Altcar
  - Parish of Altcar (population 1,439): St Michael & All Angels' Church (medieval, rebuilt 1747, 1879)
  - Parish of Formby Holy Trinity (population 6,884): Holy Trinity Church (1890)
- Benefice and Parish of Formby St Luke (population 4,970): St Luke's Church (medieval chapel to Walton, destroyed 1739, rebuilt 1854)
- Benefice and Parish of Formby St Peter (population 10,274): St Peter's Church (1746)
- Benefice and Parish of Great Crosby St Luke (population 9,661): St Luke's Church (1854) --- St Michael's Chapel (medieval chapel to Sefton, rebuilt 1774, demolished 1864)
- Benefice and Parish of Hightown (population 1,972): St Stephen's Church (1914)
- Benefice of Maghull and Melling
  - Parish of Maghull St Andrew (population 10,481): St Andrew's Church (1880) --- Maghull Chapel (medieval, ruined)
  - Parish of Maghull St James (population 4,679): St James's Church, Green Park, Maghull (1976)
  - Parish of Maghull St Peter (population 5,656): St Peter's Church (1951)
  - Parish of Melling (population 3,373): St Thomas & Holy Rood Church (medieval chapel to Halsall, rebuilt 1834)
- Benefice and Parish of Thornton and Crosby All Saints with St Frideswide (population 10,950): All Saints' Church, Great Crosby (1934) --- St Frideswide's Church, Thornton (1961, demolished 2012)

==== Deanery of Sefton South (formerly Bootle) ====
- Benefice and Parish of Bootle Christ Church (population 10,267): Christ Church (1866)
- Benefice and Parish of Bootle St Matthew and St Leonard (population 19,921): St Matthew's Church (1887) --- St Leonard's Church (1889, destroyed 1941, rebuilt 1968) --- St Mary's Church (1827, destroyed 1940, rebuilt?) --- St Andrew's Church, Litherland (1903, closed 2019) --- St Thomas's Church, Seaforth (1815, redundant 1977) --- St John's Church (1866, closed)
- Benefice of Great Crosby St Faith and Waterloo Park St Mary
  - Parish of Great Crosby St Faith (population 5,100): St Faith's Church (1900)
  - Parish of Waterloo Park (population 3,141): St Mary's Church (1887, building closed, meets in hall)
- Benefice of Litherland and Orrell Hey
  - Parish of Litherland St Paul (population 8,611): St Paul's Church, Hatton Hill, Litherland (1964)
  - Parish of Litherland St Philip (population 12,418): St Philip's Church (1863)
  - Parish of Orrell Hey (population 8,050): SS John & James's Church (2015, built C20th as Presbyterian church) --- Old SS John & James's Church (1910, demolished 2010)
- Benefice of Netherton and Sefton
  - Parish of Netherton (population 15,080): St Oswald's Church (1938, rebuilt 1970s)
  - Parish of Sefton (population 932): St Helen's Church (medieval)
- Benefice and Parish of Waterloo (population 5,989): Christ Church (C20th) --- Old Christ Church (1840, rebuilt 1899, redundant 1982) --- St John's Church (1865, building closed 2006, services in hall/school until 2020)

=== Archdeaconry of Liverpool ===
==== Deanery of Liverpool North and Walton ====
- Benefice and Parish of Anfield St Columba (population 7,197): St Columba's Church (1932)
- Benefice and Parish of Anfield St Margaret (population 3,515): St Margaret's Church (1873, rebuilt 1965)
- Benefice and Parish of Everton St George (population 3,820): St George's Church (1814) --- Christ Church (1848, destroyed 1941) --- St Chad's Church (1881, closed 1971) --- St Benedict's Church (1887, closed 1970, demolished 1976)
- Benefice and Parish of Everton St Peter with St John Chrysostom (population 8,240): St Peter's Church (1850, destroyed 1942, rebuilt 1974) --- St John Chrysostom's Church (1837, rebuilt 1853, 1975) --- Emmanuel Church (1867, demolished 1974) --- St John the Evangelist's Church (1890, closed 1975) --- St Ambrose's Church (1870, rebuilt 1961, closed) --- St Timothy's Church (1862, closed 1957) --- St Polycarp's Church (1886, closed 1974) --- St Augustine's Church (1830, destroyed 1941) --- All Saints' New Church, Liverpool (1835, rebuilt 1847, closed 1937, demolished 1961) --- Holy Trinity Church, Liverpool (1792, closed 1968) --- All Saints' Old Church, Liverpool (1798, sold 1842)
- Benefice and Parish of Fazakerley (population 20,255): Emmanuel Church (1901) --- St Paul's Church (C20th) --- St George's Church, Sparrow Hall, Fazakerley (C20th, closed)
- Benefice and Parish of Kirkdale St Athanasius with St Mary (population 11,454): St Athanasius' Church (1882, destroyed 1941, rebuilt 1957) --- St Mary's Church (1836, closed 1973) --- All Souls' Church, Vauxhall (1853, closed 1923) --- St Alban's Church, Liverpool (1850, destroyed 1941) --- Church of St Martin-in-the-Fields, Vauxhall (1829, destroyed 1941) --- St Bartholomew's Church, Vauxhall (1841, closed 1929) --- St Matthew's New Church (1848, built as Presbyterian church, closed 1929) --- St Aidan's Church (1855, rebuilt 1861, resited 1875, demolished 1960s) --- St James the Less's Church (1863, closed 1940s) --- St Asaph's Welsh Church (c. 1882, closed) --- St Titus' Church, Vauxhall (1865, closed 1918)
- Benefice and Parish of Kirkdale St Lawrence with St Paul (population 5,470): St Lawrence's Church (1873, rebuilt 1980s) --- St Paul's Church (1859, parish church 1868, rebuilt 1973)
- Benefice and Parish of Liverpool All Saints (population 23,050): St Mary's Church, Edge Hill (1813) --- St Philip's New Church (1886) --- St David's Welsh Church, Kensington (1910, demolished 1975) --- Christ Church, Kensington (1870, closed 1975) --- St John the Divine's Church, Fairfield (1853, closed 2008) --- St Silas' Church (1841, demolished 1942) --- St Jude's Church (1831, closed 1965) --- St Cyprian's Church, Edge Hill (1881, closed 2008)
- Benefice and Parish of Liverpool Our Lady & St Nicholas (population 13,998): SS Mary & Nicholas' Church (medieval chapel to Walton, parish church 1699, mostly rebuilt 1774, destroyed 1940, rebuilt 1952) --- St Peter's Church (1700, pro-cathedral 1880-1904, demolished 1922) --- St George's Church (1732, rebuilt 1825, demolished 1897) --- St Paul's Church (1769, closed 1910, demolished 1932) --- St Anne's Church (1772, rebuilt 1871, closed 1971) --- St Catherine's Church (1775, previously Nonconformist, sold 1792) --- St Mary's Church (1776, previously Nonconformist, sold c. 1795) --- St John the Baptist's Church (1783, demolished 1898) --- St Stephen's Church (1792, used Baptist church built 1722, rebuilt 1871, closed 1937) --- St Matthew's Old Church (1798, previously Presbyterian, sold 1849) --- Christ Church (1800, built 1797 as independent, closed 1965) --- Mariners' Floating Church (1827, sunk 1872) --- St Matthias' Church, Vauxhall (1834, resited 1848, closed 1949) --- St John the Evangelist's Church (1841, building 1826, abandoned 1853) --- St Mary Magdalene's Church (1862, closed 1929)
- Benefice and Parish of Walton Breck (population 12,929): Holy Trinity Church (1847) --- Christ Church (1987) --- St Saviour's Church, Everton (1867, rebuilt 1870, closed 1987) --- St Cuthbert's Church, Everton (1877, closed 1970) --- SS Simon & Jude's Church, Anfield (1883, rebuilt 1895, demolished 1987)
- Benefice and Parish of Walton-on-the-Hill St John (population 12,532): St John the Evangelist's Church (1880)
- Benefice and Parish of Walton-on-the-Hill St Luke (population 5,420): St Luke the Evangelist's Church (1882, rebuilt 1901)
- Benefice and Parish of Walton-on-the-Hill St Mary St Aidan St Nathanael (population 20,330): St Mary's Church (medieval, rebuilt 1810, 1832/43, destroyed except tower 1940, rebuilt 1953) --- St Aidan's Church (1909) --- St Nathanael's Church (1909)

==== Deanery of Liverpool South and Childwall ====
- Benefice and Parish of Aigburth (population 9,038): St Anne's Church (1837, parish church 1844)
- Benefice and Parish of Allerton (population 11,288): All Hallows' Church (1876)
- Benefice and Parish of Childwall (population 7,361): All Saints' Church (medieval)
- Benefice and Parish of Garston (population 6,799): St Michael's Church (medieval chapel to Childwall of St Wilfrid's, rebuilt as St Michael's 1715, 1877)
- Benefice and Parish of Gateacre (population 18,853): St Stephen's Church (1874, parish church 1893) --- St Mark's Church, Childwall Valley (1974) --- Christ Church, Netherley (C20th, closed 2023)
- Benefice and Parish of Grassendale (population 9,076): St Mary's Church (1853)
- Benefice of Halewood and Hunts Cross
  - Parish of Halewood (population 15,593): St Nicholas' Church (1839, parish church 1868) --- St Mary's Church (1967, rebuilt 1974)
  - Parish of Hunts Cross (population 9,973): St Hilda's Church (1898)
- Benefice and Parish of Liverpool Springwood (population 7,009): All Souls' Church (1927)
- Benefice and Parish of Mossley Hill (population 8,587): SS Matthew & James's Church (1875)
- Benefice and Parish of Much Woolton (population 11,308): St Peter's Church, Woolton (1826, rebuilt 1887)
- Benefice and Parish of Penny Lane (population 5,048): St Barnabas' Church, Mossley Hill (1900, rebuilt 1914)
- Benefice and Parish of Speke (population 14,470): All Saints' Church (1875) --- St Aidan's Church (1957)

==== Deanery of Toxteth and Wavertree ====
- Benefice and Parish of Dingle (population 9,349): St Gabriel's Church, Toxteth (1878) --- St Cleopas' Church, Toxteth (1865) --- St Thomas's Church, Toxteth (1841, closed 1946)
- Benefice and Parish of Liverpool St James in the City (population 0): St James's Church (1775, parish church 1844, redundant 1974, reopened 2010)
- Benefice and Parish of Liverpool St Luke in the City (population 24,829): St Bride's Church (1830) --- St Dunstan's Church, Edge Hill (1889) --- St Michael's Church (1826, destroyed 1941, rebuilt 1960) --- St Luke's Church (1831, mostly destroyed 1941) --- St Thomas's Church (1750, demolished 1905) --- St Catherine's Church, Abercromby Square, Liverpool (1831, demolished 1966) --- St Saviour's Church (1840, rebuilt 1901, closed 1971) --- St Catherine's Church, Edge Hill (1863, closed 1973) --- St Stephen the Martyr's, Edge Hill (1851, resited 1881, closed 1981) --- St Columba's Church (1858, building old Wesleyan chapel, closed 1930) --- St David's Old Welsh Church (1827, closed 1910) --- St Andrew's Old Church (1815, closed 1892) --- St Philip's Old Church (1816, sold 1882) --- St Mark's Old Church (1803, closed 1908, demolished 1913) --- Holy Innocents' Church (1854, built 1861, closed 1934) --- St Nathaniel's Church, West Derby (1869, rebuilt 1902, closed 1980) --- St Barnabas' Church, Toxteth (1841, demolished 1894) --- St Simon's Church (1836, building 1841 (old Dissenting chapel), rebuilt 1848, 1872, closed) --- St Mary's Church for the Blind (1819, resited 1850, closed 1927)
- Benefice and Parish of Toxteth St Bede and St Clement (population 8,881): St Bede's Church (1882, rebuilt 1886, 1924) --- St Clement's Church (1841) --- All Saints' Church (1882, closed 1972) --- St Deiniol's Welsh Church (1894, closed)
- Benefice and Parish of Toxteth St Margaret (population 4,023): St Margaret of Antioch's Church (1869)
- Benefice and Parish of Toxteth St Philemon (population 11,301): St Philemon's Church (1874) --- Holy Trinity Church (1858, closed 1940) --- St Matthew's Church (1851, closed 1931) --- St John the Baptist's Church (1832, demolished 1960) --- St Silas' Church (1865, closed 1952) --- St Paul's Church (1848, demolished 1970)
- Benefice of Toxteth Park Christ Church St Michael
  - Parish of Toxteth Park Christ Church (population 5,386): Christ Church (1871)
  - Parish of Toxteth Park St Michael-in-The-Hamlet with St Andrew (population 8,727): St Michael's Church, Aigburth (1815) --- St Andrew's New Church, Toxteth (1893, closed)
- Benefice and Parish of Toxteth Park SS Agnes & Pancras (population 5,739): St Agnes' Church (1885) --- St Pancras' Chapel, Sefton Park (1906, closed 1937)
- Benefice and Parish of Wavertree Holy Trinity (population 7,591): Holy Trinity Church (1794, parish church 1867)
- Benefice and Parish of Wavertree St Bridget (population 10,869): St Bridget's Church (1872, parish church 1901) --- St Thomas's Church (1896, rebuilt 1909, closed)
- Benefice and Parish of Wavertree St Mary (population 7,763): St Mary's Old Church (1855, destroyed 1940s) --- St Mary's New Church (built 1873 as Methodist church, sold to CoE 1952)

==== Deanery of West Derby ====
- Benefice and Parish of Knotty Ash (population 12,406): St John the Evangelist's Church (1836)
- Benefice and Parish of Liverpool Christ Our Hope (population 75,024): St Anne's Church, Old Swan (1831, rebuilt 1890) --- St Andrew's Church, Clubmoor (1899, rebuilt 1927) --- Christ Church, Norris Green (1931) --- St Cuthbert's Church, Croxteth Park (1988) --- St David's Church, Childwall (1940) --- Good Shepherd Church, West Derby (1902, rebuilt 1937) --- St Paul's Church, Croxteth (1958, closed 2020s) --- Holy Spirit Church, Dovecot (1937, closed 2024) --- St Christopher's Church, Norris Green (1932, closed 2025) --- St Paul's Church, Stoneycroft (1916, sold 2016) --- St Mark's New Church, Old Swan (1904, rebuilt 1927, closed 1973)
- Benefice and Parish of Stoneycroft (population 5,302): All Saints' Church (1875)
- Benefice and Parish of West Derby St John the Baptist (population 9,252): St John the Baptist's Church, Tuebrook (1870)
- Benefice and Parish of West Derby St Mary the Virgin with St James (population 18,125): St Mary's Church (medieval chapel to Walton, rebuilt as parish church 1853) --- St James's Church (1846, sold 2019)

=== Archdeaconry of St Helens and Warrington ===
==== Deanery of St Helens ====
- Benefice of Eccleston
  - Parish of Eccleston St James with St Matthew (population 9,428): St James's Church, Eccleston Park (1923, rebuilt and dedicated 1961) --- St Matthew's Church, Thatto Heath (1950s)
  - Parish of Eccleston St Luke (population 7,995): St Luke's Church (1931)
  - Parish of Ravenhead (population 11,354): St John the Evangelist's Church (1869) --- Emmanuel Church (1965, closed 2016)
- Benefice and Parish of Haydock St Mark (population 7,828): St Mark's Church (1905, built 1910)
- Benefice and Parish of Parr (population 7,953): St Peter's Church (1844, rebuilt 1865)
- Benefice and Parish of Rainhill (population 15,143): St Ann's Church (1837)
- Benefice and Parish of St Helens (population 67,175): St Paul's Church, Blackbrook (1972) --- St David's Church, Carr Mill (1938, rebuilt 1957) --- St Philip's Church, Derbyshire Hill (C19th/20th) --- Christ Church, Eccleston (1838) --- St Thomas's Church, Eccleston (1839) --- Moss Bank Mission Church (1855) --- Holy Trinity Church, Parr Mount (1863) --- St Andrew's Church (1908) --- St Helen's Church (medieval chapel to Prescot of St Helen's, rebuilt 1816 as St Mary's, rebuilt 1926 as St Helen's) --- All Saints' Church, Sutton (1893) --- St Michael and All Angels' Church, Sutton (1952) --- St Nicholas' Church, Sutton (1849) --- St Mary's Mission Church (C19th, closed 1972) --- Barton Street Mission Church (C19th, closed 2010s) --- St Paul's Mission Church, Eccleston (1881, closed C20th) --- St Thomas of Canterbury's Chapel, Windleshaw (medieval, ruined C16th)
- Benefice and Parish of St Helens North Road (population 5,652): St Mark's Church (1885)

==== Deanery of Warrington ====
- Benefice and Parish of Orford St Andrew (population 9,633): St Andrew's Church (1950s, built 1963)
- Benefice and Parish of Orford St Margaret and All Hallows (population 7,294): St Margaret & All Hallows' Church (1884, built 1909)
- Benefice of Warrington East
  - Parish of Birchwood and Woolston (population 17,537): Church of the Transfiguration, Birchwood (1978) --- Church of the Ascension, Woolston (1970)
  - Parish of Cinnamon Brow (population 8,870): Resurrection Local Ecumenical Partnership (1988, closed 2022)
  - Parish of Padgate (population 9,215): Christ Church & Church Collective (1838, merger 2025) --- Church Collective (2021, merged 2025)
- Benefice of Warrington Holy Trinity St Ann
  - Parish of Warrington Holy Trinity (population 3,196): Holy Trinity Church (1709, rebuilt 1760)
  - Parish of Warrington St Ann (population 5,365): St Ann's Church (1864, built 1868, rebuilt 2000)
- Benefice and Parish of Warrington St Barnabas (population 10,588): St Barnabas' Church, Bank Quay (1879) --- Bank Quay Mission Church (1870, closed 1910s)
- Benefice and Parish of Warrington St Elphin (population 12,514): St Elphin's Church (medieval) --- Central Church Warrington Bishop's Mission Order (2022, building 2025) --- St Peter's Church (1874, rebuilt 1890, closed 1978) --- St Luke's Church (1893, closed 1986) --- St Paul's Church (1830, closed 1980) --- St Clement's Mission Church (1897, closed C20th) --- St George's Mission Church (C19th, closed C20th)
- Benefice of Warrington West
  - Parish of Great Sankey (population 14,395): St Mary's Church (1728, chapel C17th, dedicated 1769)
  - Parish of Penketh (population 8,035): St Paul's Church (1889, rebuilt 1971, 2019)
  - Parish of Westbrook St James (population 12,377): St James's Church (1990)
  - Parish of Westbrook St Philip (population 12,259): St Philip's Local Ecumenical Partnership (1981, building 1989)

==== Deanery of Widnes ====
- Benefice and Parish of Ditton St Michael with St Thomas (population 15,476): St Michael's Church (1870) --- St Thomas's Local Ecumenical Partnership, Ball o' Ditton (1980, closed 2004)
- Benefice of East Widnes
  - Parish of Farnworth (parish 15,714): St Luke's Church (medieval chapel to Prescot of St Wilfrid's, parish church 1857, rededicated 1859) --- Cronton Mission Church (1907)
  - Parish of Widnes St Ambrose (parish 7,253): St Ambrose's Church (1879, rebuilt 1882)
- Benefice and Parish of Hough Green (population 8,748): All Saints' Church, Ditton (1983, shared building with R.C.s, closed 2024, building remains as R. C. church)
- Benefice of South Widnes
  - Parish of Hale (population 3,710): St Mary's Church (medieval chapel to Childwall, rebuilt 1754)
  - Parish of Widnes St Mary (population 1,384): St Mary's Church (1858, rebuilt 1910)
- Benefice and Parish of Widnes St John and St Paul (population 13,777): St John's Church (1904, resited 1963) --- St Paul's Church (1884)

==== Deanery of Wigan ====
- Benefice of Wigan
  - Parish of Wigan Central (population 26,932): St Catharine's Church, Scholes (1841, earmarked for closure) --- Christ Church, Ince-in-Makerfield (1864) --- St Andrew's Church, Springfield (1882) --- St Anne's Church, Beech Hill (1931, rebuilt 1953, earmarked for closure) --- St Mary's Old Church, Ince (1887, demolished 1978) --- St Mary's New Church, Ince (1978, built 1870s as school, closed 2021) --- Belle Green Mission Church (1869, built 1884, closed C20th)
  - Parish of Wigan East or Chapelfields (population 38,725): All Saints' Church, Hindley (C17th, rebuilt 1766) --- St Peter's Church, Hindley (1866) --- St John the Evangelist's Church, Hindley Green (1879, built 1899) --- St Nathaniel's Church, Platt Bridge (1905) --- St John the Evangelist's Church, Abram (1838, rebuilt 1937) --- SS James & Elizabeth's Church, Bickershaw (1905, earmarked for closure) --- Good Shepherd Church, Bamfurlong (1900s, rebuilt 1980s, earmarked for closure) --- St Augustine's Mission Church, Hindley (C19th, closed C20th)
  - Parish of Wigan North East: St David's Church, Haigh (1833) --- St John the Baptist's Church, New Springs (1871, rebuilt 1897) --- St Stephen's Church, Whelley (1872, building and dedication 1930) --- St Elizabeth of Hungary's Church, Aspull (1882) --- St Margaret's Chapel, Pennington Green (C19th, demolished 1920s)
  - Parish of Wigan North West (population 26,807): St John the Divine's Church, Pemberton (1832) --- St Luke's Church, Orrell (1939) --- St Francis of Assisi's Church, Kitt Green (1960s) --- St Barnabas' Church, Marsh Green (1960s, closed C21st)
  - Parish of Wigan South (population 35,263): St Thomas' Church, Ashton-in-Makerfield (medieval chapel to Winwick, rebuilt 1714, parish church 1845, rebuilt 1893) --- Holy Trinity Church, Downall Green, Ashton-in-Makerfield (1837, parish church 1845) --- St Aidan's Church, Billinge (c. 1539, rebuilt 1718, dedicated late C19th) --- St Andrew's Church, Garswood (1933) --- St Luke's Church, Stubshaw Cross (1875, built 1895, rebuilt 1996) --- St Peter's Church, Bryn (1902, rebuilt 1961, building closed 2016, services continue in scout hut)
  - Parish of Wigan Town Centre (population 18,281): All Saints' Church (medieval) --- St Michael & All Angels' Church, Swinley (1878) --- St Mark's Church, Newtown (1891) --- St George's Church (1781, closed 2010s)
  - Parish of Wigan West (population 28,470): St James' Church, Poolstock (1866) --- St Matthew's Church, Highfield (1894) --- St Paul's Church, Goose Green (1910s) --- St Thomas's Church, Wigan (1851, demolished 1970s)

==== Deanery of Winwick ====
- Benefice and Parish of Burtonwood (population 3,775): St Michael's Church (1606, rebuilt)
- Benefice of Glazebury with Hollinfare
  - Parish of Glazebury (population 1,274): All Saints' Church (1851)
  - Parish of Hollinfare (population 2,009): St Helen's Church (medieval chapel to Warrington, rebuilt c. 1700)
- Benefice and Parish of Haydock St James (population 8,200): St James's Church (1837, built 1866, parish church 1869)
- Benefice of Lowton and Golborne
  - Parish of Golborne (population 10,235): St Thomas's Church (1850)
  - Parish of Lowton St Luke (population 10,645): St Luke's Church (1732, parish church 1845)
  - Parish of Lowton St Mary (population 4,808): St Mary's Church (1861)
- Benefice of Newchurch Culcheth with Croft
  - Parish of Croft with Southworth (population 1,980): Christ Church, Croft (1833, parish church 1845)
  - Parish of Newchurch (population 8,715): Holy Trinity Church, Culcheth (medieval chapel to Winwick, rebuilt 1743, parish church 1845, rebuilt 1905)
- Benefice of Newton
  - Parish of Earlestown (population 5,901): St John the Baptist's Church (1879) --- St Philip's Mission Church (1916, closed C20th)
  - Parish of Newton-in-Makerfield All Saints (population 5,629): All Saints' Church (1914)
  - Parish of Newton-in-Makerfield Emmanuel (population 6,818): Emmanuel Church (1841, parish church 1845)
  - Parish of Newton-in-Makerfield St Peter (population 7,075): St Peter's Church (medieval chapel to Winwick, rebuilt 1684, parish church 1845)
- Benefice and Parish of Winwick (population 2,426): St Oswald's Church (medieval)

==== On the Wirral (Chester diocese) ====
- Tranmere church (1831)
- Liscard Church, Egremont (1833)
- St Peter's, Rock Ferry (1842)
- Christ Church, Claughton (1849)
- St James's, New Brighton (1854)
- St Paul's, Tranmere (1854)
- Christ Church, Bebington (1857)
- St Paul's, Lower Tranmere (1857)
- Wallasey church (rebuilt 1859)
- Moreton new church (1863)
- St Paul's, Birkenhead (1863)
- St Peter's, Birkenhead (1868)
- St Mary's, Liscard (1876)
- St Catherine's, Birkenhead (1876)
- St John's, Great Sutton, Eastham (1878)
- St Luke's, Lower Tranmere (1881)
- St Matthew's, Birkenhead (1888)
- St Mark's, Claughton (1891)
- Port Sunlight church (1904)
- St Nicholas, Wallasey (1911)

== Progression of church numbers ==
| Period | Additions | Closures | Total at end |
|---|---|---|---|
| Medieval | Altcar, Ashton, Aughton, Childwall, Crosby, Culcheth, Farnworth, Formby, Garston, Hale, Halsall, Hollinfare, Huyton, Kirkby, Lathom, Liverpool, Lydiate, Maghull, Melling, Newton, North Meols, Ormskirk, Prescot, Rainford, St Helens, Sefton, Upholland, Walton, Warrington, West Derby, Wigan, Windleshaw, Winwick | | 33 |
| Reformation | Billinge, Burtonwood | Lydiate, Maghull, Rainford, Windleshaw | 31 |
| C17th | Hindley | | 32 |
| 1700s | Lpl St Peter, Rainford, Warrington Trinity | | 35 |
| 1720s | Great Sankey | | 36 |
| 1730s | Lpl St George, Lowton | | 38 |
| 1750s | Lpl St Thomas | | 39 |
| 1760s | Hoscar, Lpl St Paul | | 41 |
| 1770s | Lpl St Anne, Lpl St Catherine, Lpl St James, Lpl St Mary, Skelmersdale | | 46 |
| 1780s | Lpl St John the Baptist, Wigan St George | | 48 |
| 1790s | Lpl All SS, Lpl St Matthew, Lpl St Stephen, Lpl Trinity, Wavertree | Lpl St Catherine, Lpl St Mary | 51 |
| 1800s | Lpl Christ Ch, Lpl St Mark | | 53 |
| 1810s | Aigburth, Everton, Lpl Blind, Lpl St Andrew, Lpl St Mary, Lpl St Philip, Seaforth | | 60 |
| 1820s | Bootle, Lpl Mariners, Lpl St David, Lpl St Martin, Lpl St Michael, Southport, Woolton | | 67 |
| 1830s | Abram, Aigburth St Anne, Ashton Trinity, Burscough Bridge, Croft, Crossens, Eccleston Christ Ch, Eccleston St Thomas, Haigh, Halewood, Haydock, Kirkdale, Knotty Ash, Knowsley, Lpl St Augustine, Lpl St Bride, Lpl St Catherine, Lpl St Chrysostom, Lpl St Jude, Lpl St Luke, Lpl St Matthias, Lpl St Simon, Old Swan, Padgate, Pemberton, Rainhill, Southport Trinity, Toxteth St John the Baptist, Warrington St Paul | | 96 |
| 1840s | Aintree, Bickerstaffe, Everton Christ Ch, Lpl St Barnabas, Lpl St Bartholomew, Lpl St Clement, Lpl St John, Lpl St Saviour, Lpl St Silas, Lydiate, Newton Emmanuel, Parr, Sutton, Toxteth St Paul, Toxteth St Thomas, Walton Trinity, Waterloo, West Derby St James, Whiston, Wigan St Catharine | Lpl St John | 115 |
| 1850s | Birkdale, Crosby St Luke, Edge Hill St Stephen, Everton St Peter, Fairfield, Formby St Luke, Glazebury, Golborne, Grassendale, Kirkdale St Paul, Lpl St Aidan, Lpl St Alban, Lpl All Souls, Lpl St Columba, Lpl Holy Innocents, Moss Bank, Newburgh, Pennington Green?, Roby, Scarisbrick, Toxteth St Matthew, Toxteth Trinity, Wavertree St Mary, Westhead, Widnes St Mary, Wigan St Thomas | | 141 |
| 1860s | Aughton Christ Ch, Banks, Belle Green, Bootle Christ Ch, Bootle St John, Edge Hill St Catherine, Everton St Saviour, Hindley St Peter, Ince, Litherland, Lpl St Cleopas, Lpl Emmanuel, Lpl St James the Less, Lpl St Margaret, Lpl St Mary Magdalene, Lpl St Nathaniel, Lpl St Timothy, Lpl St Titus, Lowton St Mary, Ravenhead, St Helens Trinity, Southport St Paul, Toxteth St Silas, Warrington St Anne, Waterloo St John, Wigan St James | Crosby | 166 |
| 1870s | Allerton, Anfield, Bank Quay, Birkdale St Peter, Blundellsands, Dalton, Ditton, Earlestown, Gateacre, Hindley Green, Kensington, Lpl St Ambrose, Lpl St Cuthbert, Lpl St Gabriel, Lpl St Lawrence, Lpl St Philemon, Mossley Hill, New Springs, Southport All SS, Southport St Andrew, Southport St Philip, Speke, Stoneycroft, Stubshaw Cross, Toxteth Christ Ch, Tuebrook, Warrington St Barnabas, Warrington St Peter, Wavertree St Bridget, Whelley, Widnes St Ambrose, Wigan St Michael | Lpl Mariners | 197 |
| 1880s | Ainsdale, Aspull, Bootle St Leonard, Bootle St Matthew, Eccleston St Paul, Hindley St Augustine?, Ince St Mary, Lpl St Agnes, Lpl St Asaph, Lpl St Athanasius, Lpl St Bede, Lpl St Benedict, Lpl St Chad, Lpl St Cyprian, Lpl St Dunstan, Lpl St Polycarp, Lpl SS Simon & Jude, Maghull, Orford, Penketh, St Helens St Mark, St Helens St Philip?, Southport St Luke, Toxteth All SS, Walton St John, Walton St Luke, Warrington St George?, Waterloo St Mary, Widnes St Paul, Wigan St Andrew | | 227 |
| 1890s | Birkdale St John, Clubmoor, Everton St John, Formby Trinity, Huyton St Gabriel, Lpl St Deiniol, Lpl St Hilda, St Helens All SS, St Helens Barton Street?, St Helens St Mary?, Southport Emmanuel, Southport SS Simon & Jude, Warrington St Clement, Warrington St Luke, Wavertree St Thomas, Wigan St Mark, Wigan St Matthew | Lpl St Barnabas, Lpl St George, Lpl St John the Baptist | 241 |
| 1900s | Bamfurlong, Bickershaw, Blundellsands St Michael, Bryn, Burscough St Andrew, Cronton, Crosby St Faith, Fazakerley, Haydock St Mark, Litherland St Andrew, Lpl Cathedral, Lpl St Mark, Lpl St Pancras, Mossley Hill St Barnabas, Platt Bridge, St Helens St Andrew, Scarisbrick Good Shepherd, Southport All Souls, Walton St Aidan, Walton St Nathanael, West Derby Good Shepherd, Widnes St John | Lpl St Mark, Lpl St Thomas | 261 |
| 1910s | Earlestown St Philip, Hightown, Newton All SS, Orrell Hey, Stoneycroft St Paul, Wigan St Paul | Bank Quay, Lpl St Titus | 265 |
| 1920s | Eccleston St James, Springwood | Lpl All Souls, Lpl Blind, Lpl St Bartholomew, Lpl St Mary Magdalene, Lpl St Matthew, Lpl St Peter, Pennington Green | 260 |
| 1930s | Aintree St Giles, Anfield St Columba, Crosby All SS, Dovecot, Eccleston St Luke, Garswood, Lpl St Christopher, Lpl St Oswald, Norris Green Christ Ch, Orrell, St Helens St David, Wigan St Anne | Eccleston St Paul?, Lpl Holy Innocents, Lpl St Columba, Lpl St Pancras, Lpl St Paul, Lpl St Simon?, Lpl St Stephen, Toxteth St Matthew | 264 |
| 1940s | Childwall St David, West Derby St Luke | Bootle, Everton Christ Ch, Everton St Peter, Lpl St Alban, Lpl St Augustine, Lpl St James the Less, Lpl St Luke, Lpl St Martin, Lpl St Matthias, Lpl St Silas, Toxteth St Thomas, Toxteth Trinity | 254 |
| 1950s | Croxteth St Paul, Fazakerley St George?, Fazakerley St Paul?, Huyton St George, Kirkby St Martin, Kirkby St Mark, Maghull St Peter, Prescot St Paul, St Helens St Michael, Speke St Aidan, Thatto Heath, Warrington St Andrew | Bootle St John?, Hoscar?, Lpl St Asaph?, Lpl St Deiniol?, Lpl St Timothy, Toxteth St Silas | 260 |
| 1960s | Halewood St Mary, Kirkby St Andrew, Litherland St Paul, Netherley?, Ravenhead Emmanuel, Skelmersdale Ecumenical, Thornton, Wigan St Barnabas, Wigan St Francis | Earlestown St Philip?, Lpl St Aidan, Lpl All SS, Lpl St Andrew?, Lpl St Catherine, Lpl Christ Ch, Lpl St Jude, Lpl Trinity, Toxteth St John the Baptist, Warrington St Clement?, Warrington St George? | 258 |
| 1970s | Childwall St Mark, Digmoor, Everton St Peter, Maghull St James, St Helens St Paul, Stockbridge, Warrington Ascension, Warrington Transfiguration | Edge Hill St Catherine, Everton St John, Hindley St Augustine?, Kensington, Kirkdale, Lpl St Ambrose?, Lpl St Anne, Lpl St Benedict, Lpl St Chad, Lpl St Cuthbert, Lpl St David, Lpl Emmanuel, Lpl St James, Lpl St Mark, Lpl St Polycarp, Lpl St Saviour, St Helens St Mary, Seaforth, Southport St Andrew, Toxteth All SS, Toxteth St Paul, Warrington St Peter, Wavertree St Thomas?, Wigan St Thomas | 242 |
| 1980s | Croxteth Park, Kew, Walton Christ Ch, Warrington Resurrection, Warrington St Philip, Widnes All Saints, Widnes St Thomas | Edge Hill St Stephen, Everton St Saviour, Lpl St Nathaniel, Lpl SS Simon & Jude, Southport St Paul, Warrington St Luke, Warrington St Paul | 242 |
| 1990s | Page Moss, Warrington St James | Aintree, Belle Green? | 242 |
| 2000s | Skelmersdale Oaks | Fairfield, Fazakerley St George?, Lpl St Cyprian, Southport All Souls, Widnes St Thomas | 238 |
| 2010s | Lpl St James | Kirkby St Mark, Litherland St Andrew, Ravenhead Emmanuel, St Helens Barton Street, Stockbridge, Stoneycroft St Paul, Thornton, West Derby St James, Wigan St Barnabas, Wigan St George | 229 |
| 2020s | Warrington Central, Warrington Collective | Croxteth St Paul, Dovecot, Ince St Mary, Lpl St Christopher, Netherley, Warrington Collective, Warrington Resurrection, Waterloo St John, Widnes All Saints | 221 |

== Dedications ==
=== Medieval churches ===
The area covered by the present Diocese of Liverpool, with its population of 1.6 million people, was in the Middle Ages (before the great population explosion of the Industrial Revolution) covered by just thirteen parish churches (Altcar, Aughton, Childwall, Halsall, Huyton, North Meols, Ormskirk, Prescot, Sefton, Walton, Warrington, Wigan and Winwick) and their twenty dependent chapelries (Ashton, Culcheth, Farnworth, Formby, Garston, Great Crosby, Hale, Hollinfare, Kirkby, Lathom, Liverpool, Lydiate, Maghull, Melling, Newton, Rainford, St Helens, Upholland, West Derby and Windleshaw).

- All Saints: Childwall, Rainford, Wigan
- St Catherine: Lydiate
- St Chad: Kirkby
- St Cuthbert: Halsall, North Meols
- St Elphin: Warrington
- St Helen: Hollinfare, St Helens, Sefton
- St John the Evangelist: Lathom
- St Luke: Formby
- St Mary: Hale, Prescot, Walton, West Derby
- SS Mary & Nicholas: Liverpool
- St Michael: Altcar, Aughton, Great Crosby, Huyton
- St Oswald: Winwick
- St Peter: Newton-in-Makerfield
- SS Peter & Paul: Ormskirk
- St Thomas the Apostle: Ashton-in-Makerfield
- St Thomas Becket: Upholland, Windleshaw
- St Thomas & Holy Rood: Melling
- Holy Trinity: Culcheth
- St Wilfrid: Farnworth, Garston
- Dedication unknown: Maghull

=== Post-medieval churches ===
- St Agnes: Toxteth (1885)
- St Aidan: Billinge (late C19th), Kirkdale (1855), Speke (1957), Walton (1909)
- St Alban: Liverpool (1850)
- All Saints: Allerton (1876), Glazebury (1851), Great Crosby (1934), Hindley (C17th), Liverpool (1798, 1835), Newton (1914), St Helens (1893), Southport (1870), Speke (1875), Stoneycroft (1875), Toxteth (1882), Widnes (1983)
- All Souls: Southport (pre-1914), Springwood (1927), Vauxhall (1853)
- St Ambrose: Everton (1870), Widnes (1879)
- St Andrew: Burscough Bridge (1903), Clubmoor (1899), Garswood (1933), Kirkby (1960s), Litherland (1903), Liverpool (1815), Maghull (1880), Orford (1950s), St Helens (1908), Southport (1872), Toxteth (1893), Wigan (1882)
- St Anne: Aigburth (1837), Liverpool (1772), Old Swan (1831), Rainhill (1837), Warrington (1868), Wigan (1931)
- St Asaph: Kirkdale (c. 1882)
- Ascension: Woolston (1970)
- St Athanasius: Kirkdale (1882)
- St Augustine: Everton (1830), Hindley (C19th)
- St Barnabas: Mossley Hill (1900), Toxteth (1841), Warrington (1879), Wigan (1960s)
- St Bartholomew: Roby (1850), Vauxhall (1841)
- St Bede: Toxteth (1882)
- St Benedict: Everton (1887)
- St Bridget: Liverpool (1830), Wavertree (1872)
- St Catherine: Edge Hill (1863), Liverpool (1775, 1831), Scholes (1841)
- St Chad: Everton (1881)
- Christ Church: Aughton (1867), Bootle (1866), Croft (1833), Eccleston (1838), Everton (1848), Ince (1864), Kensington (1870), Liverpool (1800), Liverpool Cathedral (1904), Netherley (C20th), Newburgh (1857), Norris Green (1931), Padgate (1838), Southport (1821), Toxteth (1871), Walton Breck (1987), Waterloo (1840)
- Christ the Servant: Digmoor (1970)
- St Christopher: Norris Green (1932)
- St Chrysostom: Everton (1837)
- St Clement: Toxteth (1841), Warrington (1897)
- St Cleopas: Toxteth (1865)
- St Columba: Anfield (1932), Liverpool (1858)
- St Cuthbert: Croxteth Park (1988), Everton (1877)
- St Cyprian: Edge Hill (1881), Hoscar (1767)
- St David: Carr Mill (1938), Childwall (1940), Haigh (1833), Kensington (1910), Liverpool (1827)
- St Deiniol: Toxteth (1894)
- St Dunstan: Edge Hill (1889)
- St Elizabeth of Hungary: Aspull (1882)
- Emmanuel: Everton (1867), Fazakerley (1901), Newton (1841), Ravenhead (1965), Southport (1898)
- St Faith: Great Crosby (1900)
- St Francis: Kew (1987), Wigan (1960s)
- St Frideswide: Thornton (1961)
- St Gabriel: Huyton (1894), Toxteth (1878)
- St George: Everton (1814), Fazakerley (C20th), Huyton (1958), Liverpool (1732), Warrington (C19th), Wigan (1781)
- St Giles: Aintree (1938)
- Good Shepherd: Bamfurlong (1900s), Scarisbrick (1907), West Derby (1902)
- St Hilda: Hunts Cross (1898)
- Holy Innocents: Kensington (1861), Liverpool (1854)
- St James: Birkdale (1857), Eccleston Park (1961), Haydock (1866), Liverpool (1775), Maghull (1976), Poolstock (1866), West Derby (1846), Westbrook (1990), Westhead (1851)
- SS James & Elizabeth: Bickershaw (1905)
- St James the Less: Kirkdale (1863)
- St John the Baptist: Burscough Bridge (1832), Earlestown (1879), Liverpool (1783), New Springs (1871), Toxteth (1832), Tuebrook (1870)
- St John the Evangelist: Abram (1838), Ainsdale (1882), Birkdale (1890), Bootle (1866), Crossens (1837), Everton (1890), Fairfield (1853), Hindley Green (1879), Knotty Ash (1836), Liverpool (1841), Pemberton (1832), Ravenhead (1869), Walton (1880), Waterloo (1865), Widnes (1904)
- SS John & James: Orrell Hey (1910)
- St Jude: Stockbridge Village (1972), Liverpool (1831)
- St Lawrence: Kirkdale (1873)
- St Leonard: Bootle (1889)
- St Luke: Eccleston (1931), Farnworth (1859), Great Crosby (1854), Liverpool (1831), Lowton (1732), Orrell (1939), Southport (1880), Stubshaw Cross (1895), Walton (1882), Warrington (1893), West Derby (1948)
- St Margaret: Anfield (1873), Pennington Green (C19th), Toxteth (1869)
- St Margaret & All Saints: Orford (1884)
- St Mark: Childwall Valley (1974), Haydock (1905), Kirkby (1950s), Liverpool (1803), Newtown (1891), St Helens (1885), Scarisbrick (1851), Woolton (1866)
- St Martin: Kirkby (1955), Vauxhall (1829)
- St Mary: Bootle (1827), Edge Hill (1813), Grassendale (1853), Great Sankey (1769), Halewood (1967), Kirkdale (1836), Knowsley (1844), Liverpool (1776, 1819), Lower Ince (1887), Lowton (1861), St Helens (1816), Waterloo Park (1887), Wavertree (1855), Widnes (1858)
- St Mary Magdalene: Liverpool (1862)
- St Matthew: Bootle (1887), Liverpool (1798), Thatto Heath (1950s), Toxteth (1851), Wigan (1894)
- SS Matthew & James: Mossley Hill (1875)
- St Matthias: Vauxhall (1834)
- St Michael: Aigburth (1815), Blundellsands (1907), Burtonwood (1606), Dalton (1870), Ditton (1871), Garston (1715), Liverpool (1826), Sutton (1952), Widnes (1870), Wigan (1878)
- St Nathaniel: Platt Bridge (1905), Walton (1909), West Derby (1869)
- St Nicholas: Blundellsands (1874), Halewood (1839), St Helens (1849), Whiston (1846)
- St Oswald: Netherton (1938)
- St Pancras: Sefton Park (1906)
- St Paul: Blackbrook (1972), Croxteth (1958), Eccleston (1881), Fazakerley (C20th), Goose Green (1910s), Kirkdale (1859), Litherland (1964), Liverpool (1769), Penketh (1889), Prescot (1956), Skelmersdale (1776), Southport (1864), Stoneycroft (1916), Toxteth (1848), Warrington (1830), Widnes (1884)
- St Peter: Aintree (1846), Birkdale (1871), Bryn (1902), Everton (1850), Formby (1746), Hindley (1866), Liverpool (1700), Maghull (1951), Parr (1844), Warrington (1874), Woolton (1826)
- St Philemon: Toxteth (1874)
- St Philip: Derbyshire Hill (C19th/20th), Earlestown (1916), Liverpool (1816), Litherland (1863), Southport (1876), Westbrook (1981)
- St Polycarp: Everton (1886)
- Resurrection: Cinnamon Brow (1988)
- St Saviour: Everton (1867), Liverpool (1840)
- St Silas: Liverpool (1841), Toxteth (1865)
- St Simon: Liverpool (1836)
- SS Simon & Jude: Anfield (1883), Southport (1895)
- Holy Spirit: Dovecot (1937)
- St Stephen: Banks (1868), Edge Hill (1851), Gateacre (1874), Hightown (1914), Liverpool (1792), Whelley (1930)
- St Thomas the Apostle: Golborne (1850), Liverpool (1750), Lydiate (1841), St Helens (1839), Seaforth (1815), Toxteth (1841), Wavertree (1896), Widnes (1980), Wigan (1851)
- St Timothy: Everton (1862)
- St Titus: Vauxhall (1865)
- Transfiguration: Birchwood (1978)
- (Holy) Trinity: Ashton (1837), Bickerstaffe (1843), Formby (1890), Liverpool (1792), Page Moss (1991), St Helens (1863), Southport (1837), Toxteth (1858), Walton Breck (1847), Warrington (1709), Wavertree (1794)
- No dedication: Bank Quay (1870), Belle Green (1869), Cronton (1907), Liverpool (1827), Moss Bank (1855), Skelmersdale (x2) (1960s, 2004), Warrington (2021, 2022)

== Benefices by population ==
| Benefice | Population | Churches | Clergy (Nov 2025) |
|---|---|---|---|
| Wigan | 188,178 | 30 | 1 Team Rector, 9 Team Vicars, 3 Curates, 6 NSMs, 2 OLMs |
| Liverpool Christ Our Hope | 75,024 | 6 | 1 Team Rector, 6 Team Vicars, 3 Curates, 3 NSMs |
| St Helens | 67,175 | 12 | 1 Team Rector, 5 Team Vicars, 6 Curates, 1 NSM |
| Warrington West | 47,066 | 4 | 1 Team Vicar, 1 Curate, 1 NSM |
| Kirkby | 40,554 | 3 | 1 Team Rector, 2 Team Vicars |
| Halewood and Hunts Cross // Speke | 40,036 | 5 | 1 Jt Rector/Priest-in-Charge, 1 Team Vicar, 1 Jt Curate, 2 Curates |
| Warrington East | 35,622 | 3 | 1 Team Vicar, 2 Curates |
| Eccleston // St Helens North Road | 34,429 | 5 | Vacant (x2), 1 Team Vicar |
| Up Holland and Dalton | 33,583 | 4 | 1 Rector, 2 NSMs |
| Litherland and Orrell Hey | 29,079 | 3 | 1 Team Rector, 1 Team Vicar, 1 NSM |
| Liverpool St Luke in the City // Toxteth St Margaret | 28,852 | 4 | 1 Jt Team Rector/P-in-C, 1 Team Vicar, 1 Jt Cur, 1 Curate, 1 NSM |
| Walton-on-the-Hill St Mary etc. // Walton St Luke | 25,750 | 4 | Vacant |
| Lowton and Golborne | 25,688 | 3 | 1 Team Rector, 1 Team Vicar, 1 NSM |
| Newton | 25,423 | 4 | 1 Team Rector, 1 Team Vicar, 3 NSMs |
| Ditton St Michael with St Thomas // Hough Green | 24,224 | 1 | 1 Vicar |
| Maghull and Melling | 24,189 | 4 | 1 Team Rector, 1 Team Vicar, 1 NSM |
| Liverpool All Saints | 23,050 | 2 | Vacant, 1 Curate, 1 NSM |
| East Widnes | 22,967 | 3 | 1 Priest-in-Charge |
| Fazakerley | 20,255 | 2 | 1 Team Rector |
| Bootle St Matthew and St Leonard | 19,921 | 2 | Vacant (since 2020), 1 Curate |
| Toxteth St Bede and St Clement // Wavertree St Bridget | 19,750 | 3 | 1 Joint Priest-in-Charge, 1 NSM |
| Gateacre | 18,853 | 2 | 1 Team Rector |
| West Derby St Mary the Virgin with St James | 18,125 | 1 | 1 Vicar |
| West Derby St Luke and Stockbridge Village St Jude | 17,263 | 1 | 1 Vicar |
| Orford St Andrew // Orford St Margaret | 16,927 | 2 | 1 Joint Vicar/Priest-in-Charge |
| Ormskirk | 16,674 | 2 | Vacant, 1 NSM |
| Netherton and Sefton | 16,012 | 2 | 1 Team Vicar, 1 Curate |
| Roby | 15,410 | 2 | 1 Vicar |
| Rainhill | 15,143 | 1 | Vacant |
| Prescot | 14,526 | 2 | 1 Vicar, 1 Curate |
| Toxteth Park Christ Church St Michael | 14,113 | 2 | 1 Vicar |
| Liverpool Our Lady & St Nicholas | 13,998 | 1 | 1 Rector, 4 NSMs |
| Widnes St John and St Paul | 13,777 | 2 | 1 Vicar |
| Newchurch Culcheth with Croft // Winwick | 13,121 | 3 | 1 Joint Rector/Priest-in-Charge, 1 Curate |
| North Meols | 12,982 | 3 | 1 Team Rector |
| Walton Breck | 12,929 | 2 | 1 Vicar |
| Walton-on-the-Hill St John | 12,532 | 1 | 1 Vicar |
| Warrington St Elphin | 12,514 | 2 | 1 Rector, 1 BMO Pioneer Minister |
| Knotty Ash | 12,406 | 1 | Vacant (since 2022) |
| Huyton | 12,400 | 1 | Vacant, 1 Hon. Curate |
| Earlsfield | 12,007 | 2 | 1 Team Rector |
| Kirkdale St Athanasius with St Mary | 11,454 | 1 | Vacant (since 2003) |
| Birkdale St James // Birkdale St Peter | 11,381 | 2 | 1 Joint Vicar/Priest-in-Charge |
| Much Woolton | 11,308 | 1 | 1 Rector, 1 Curate |
| Toxteth St Philemon (under Bishop of Ebbsfleet) | 11,301 | 1 | 1 Rector, 1 Curate |
| Allerton | 11,288 | 1 | 1 Rector |
| Birkdale St John | 11,264 | 1 | 1 Vicar |
| Southport St Philip and St Paul | 11,026 | 1 | Vacant, 1 NSM |
| Thornton and Crosby All Saints with St Frideswide | 10,950 | 1 | 1 Vicar |
| Warrington St Barnabas | 10,588 | 1 | 1 Vicar |
| Ainsdale | 10,425 | 1 | 1 Vicar |
| Skelmersdale St Paul | 10,300 | 2 | 1 Priest-in-Charge, 1 OLM |
| Formby St Peter | 10,274 | 1 | 1 Vicar, 1 Curate |
| Bootle Christ Church | 10,267 | 1 | 1 Priest-in-Charge |
| Southport Emmanuel | 10,208 | 1 | 1 Priest-in-Charge |
| Burscough Bridge | 10,150 | 2 | 1 Vicar, 1 Curate, 2 NSMs |
| Great Crosby St Luke | 9,661 | 1 | 1 Vicar, 1 NSM |
| Huyton Quarry | 9,497 | 1 | 1 Vicar |
| Whiston | 9,402 | 1 | 1 Vicar |
| Dingle | 9,349 | 2 | 1 Vicar |
| West Derby St John the Baptist (Bishop of Beverley) | 9,252 | 1 | 1 Vicar |
| Grassendale | 9,076 | 1 | Vacant (0.5FTE) |
| Aigburth St Anne | 9,038 | 1 | Vacant, 1 NSM |
| Halsall, Lydiate and Downholland | 8,865 | 2 | 1 Rector, 1 NSM |
| Mossley Hill | 8,587 | 1 | 1 Rector, 1 NSM |
| Warrington Holy Trinity St Ann | 8,561 | 2 | 1 Vicar, 1 NSM, 1 OLM |
| Southport SS Simon & Jude (Bishop of Ebbsfleet) | 8,496 | 1 | 1 Vicar |
| Southport Holy Trinity // S-port St Luke (latter B of Bev) | 8,461 | 2 | 1 Joint Vicar/Priest-in-Charge |
| Blundellsands St Nicholas | 8,391 | 1 | 1 Vicar, 1 Curate |
| Formby Holy Trinity and Altcar | 8,323 | 2 | Vacant, 1 NSM |
| Great Crosby St Faith and Waterloo Park St Mary | 8,241 | 2 | 1 Vicar, 1 Hon. Curate |
| Everton St Peter with St John Chrysostom | 8,240 | 2 | 1 Rector |
| Haydock St James (Bishop of Beverley) | 8,200 | 1 | 1 Vicar |
| Parr | 7,953 | 1 | Vacant |
| Haydock St Mark | 7,828 | 1 | 1 Vicar, 1 NSM |
| Rainford | 7,805 | 1 | 1 Vicar |
| Wavertree St Mary | 7,763 | 1 | Vacant (since 2022), 1 Curate |
| Aintree | 7,734 | 1 | 1 Vicar, 1 NSM |
| Aughton Christ Church | 7,696 | 1 | 1 Vicar, 1 NSM |
| Wavertree Holy Trinity | 7,591 | 1 | 1 Rector, 1 NSM |
| Childwall | 7,361 | 1 | 1 Vicar, 1 Curate |
| Anfield St Columba (Bishop of Beverley) | 7,197 | 1 | 1 Vicar |
| Liverpool Springwood | 7,009 | 1 | 1 Vicar |
| Garston | 6,799 | 1 | 1 Vicar |
| Aughton St Michael and Bickerstaffe | 6,249 | 2 | 1 Rector |
| Waterloo | 5,989 | 1 | 1 Vicar |
| Southport All Saints | 5,910 | 1 | Vacant, 1 Curate |
| Toxteth Park SS Agnes & Pancras (Bishop of Beverley) | 5,739 | 1 | 1 Vicar |
| Kirkdale St Lawrence with St Paul | 5,470 | 2 | Vacant, 1 NSM |
| Stoneycroft | 5,302 | 1 | Vacant |
| South Widnes | 5,094 | 2 | 1 Priest-in-Charge |
| Penny Lane | 5,048 | 1 | 1 Priest-in-Charge, 1 Curate |
| Formby St Luke | 4,970 | 1 | 1 Vicar |
| Southport Christ Church | 4,863 | 1 | 1 Vicar, 1 NSM |
| Everton St George | 3,820 | 1 | Vacant |
| Burtonwood | 3,775 | 1 | 1 Priest-in-Charge, 1 NSM |
| Blundellsands St Michael | 3,699 | 1 | Vacant (0.5FTE) |
| Anfield St Margaret | 3,515 | 1 | 1 Vicar, 1 NSM |
| Scarisbrick | 3,405 | 1 | 1 Vicar |
| Glazebury with Hollinfare | 3,283 | 2 | Vacant (since 2009) |
| Kew | 3,236 | 1 | Vacant |
| Westhead | 2,005 | 1 | Vacant (HfD), 1 OLM |
| Hightown | 1,972 | 1 | 1 Vicar |
| Newburgh | 1,093 | 1 | Vacant (HfD) |
| [Liverpool Cathedral | 62 | 1 | 1 Dean, 2 Canons Residentiary] |
| Liverpool St James | 0 | 1 | 1 Vicar |

There are a total of 105 benefices (counting multiple benefices held simultaneously by the same cleric as one). The Wigan benefice has the dubious honour of being the largest (by population, number of churches and number of clergy) in the Church of England.

== Deaneries by population ==
| Deanery | Population | Churches | Clergy (Nov 2025) | Popn. per stip. cl. |
|---|---|---|---|---|
| Wigan | 188,178 | 30 | 1 Rector, 9 Vicars, 3 Curates, 6 NSMs, 2 OLMs | 14,475 |
| Liverpool North and Walton | 148,210 | 20 | 3 Rectors, 4 Vicars, 1 Curate, 7 NSMs | 18,526 |
| Liverpool South and Childwall | 134,403 | 16 | 5 Rectors, 4 Vicars, 1 Priest-in-Charge, 6 Curates, 2 NSMs | 8,400 |
| St Helens | 132,528 | 20 | 1 Rector, 7 Vicars, 6 Curates, 2 NSMs | 9,466 |
| Warrington | 131,278 | 14 | 1 Rector, 5 Vicars, 1 Pioneer Minister, 3 Curates, 2 NSMs, 1 OLM | 13,128 |
| Huyton | 131,059 | 13 | 2 Rectors, 7 Vicars, 1 Curate, 1 Hon. Curate | 13,106 |
| West Derby | 120,109 | 10 | 1 Rector, 8 Vicars, 3 Curates, 3 NSMs | 10,009 |
| Ormskirk | 107,825 | 19 | 3 Rectors, 4 Vicars, 1 Priest-in-Charge, 1 Curate, 7 NSMs, 2 OLMs | 11,981 |
| Toxteth and Wavertree | 104,458 | 16 | 3 Rectors, 5 Vicars, 1 Priest-in-Charge, 4 Curates, 3 NSMs | 8,035 |
| North Meols | 98,252 | 15 | 1 Rector, 6 Vicars, 1 Priest-in-Charge, 1 Curate, 2 NSMs | 10,917 |
| Sefton North | 90,163 | 14 | 1 Rector, 8 Vicars, 2 Curates, 4 NSMs | 8,197 |
| Sefton South | 89,509 | 11 | 1 Rector, 4 Vicars, 1 Priest-in-Charge, 2 Curates, 1 NSM, 1 Hon. Curate | 11,189 |
| Winwick | 79,490 | 14 | 3 Rectors, 3 Vicars, 1 Priest-in-Charge, 1 Curate, 5 NSMs | 9,936 |
| Widnes | 66,062 | 8 | 2 Vicars, 2 Priests-in-Charge | 16,516 |
| Totals | 1,621,524 | 220 | 145 stipendiary clergy, 51 non-stipendiary | average: 11,183 |

== Archdeaconries by population ==
| Archdeaconry | Population | Churches | Clergy (Nov 2025) | Popn. per stip. cl. |
|---|---|---|---|---|
| St Helens and Warrington | 597,536 | 86 | 49 stipendiary, 18 non-stipendiary | 12,195 |
| Knowsley and Sefton | 516,808 | 72 | 47 stipendiary, 18 non-stipendiary | 10,996 |
| Liverpool | 507,180 | 62 | 49 stipendiary, 15 non-stipendiary | 10,351 |
