= Miranda Threlfall-Holmes =

Anglican priest, archdeacon of Liverpool (born 1973)

The Venerable Miranda Threlfall-Holmes
- Archdeacon of Liverpool
- Church: Church of England
- Diocese: Diocese of Liverpool
- In office: September 2023 to present
- Predecessor: Mike McGurk
- Other posts: Team Rector, St Luke-in-the-City, Liverpool (2017–2023)

Orders
- Ordination: 2003 (deacon); 2004 (priest) by Martin Wharton (both)

Personal details
- Born: 1973 (age 52–53)
- Denomination: Anglican
- Spouse: Phil
- Children: three
- Profession: church historian; theologian; writer
- Education: Christ's College, Cambridge

Miranda Threlfall-Holmes (born 1973) is an Anglican priest who has been the Archdeacon of Liverpool since 2023.

== Education and training ==
Threlfall-Holmes studied history at Christ's College, Cambridge, and receiving her Bachelor of Arts (BA) degree in 1995: as per tradition, her BA was promoted to a Master of Arts (MA Cantab) in 1997. She worked in brand management, before moving to Durham to study for her history doctorate at University College, Durham. She received her Doctor of Philosophy (PhD) degree in 2000, with a doctoral thesis titled "Monks and markets: Durham Cathedral-Priory, 1460-1520". She then began training for the Anglican priesthood at Cranmer Hall, Durham, and received her second BA from St John's College, Durham in 2002.

== Ministry ==
Threlfall-Holmes was made deacon at Petertide 2003 (on 29 June) and ordained priest the following Petertide (4 July 2004), both times by Martin Wharton, Bishop of Newcastle, at Newcastle Cathedral. She began her ordained ministry with a curacy at Heaton, Newcastle upon Tyne; then returned to Durham in 2006, becoming chaplain and Solway Fellow at University College until 2012; while in that post she also served as interim Principal of Ustinov College, 2011–2012. Her next post was in parish ministry in the same diocese: as Vicar of Belmont and Pittington; later in her tenure there, she also served as area dean of the Durham (city) deanery, 2016–2017.

Threlfall-Holmes has been Team Rector of the St Luke-in-the-City Team in Liverpool city centre since 2017; she was instituted to the role by Paul Bayes, Bishop of Liverpool, in a service at St Dunstan's on 10 August 2017. Remaining Team Rector, she also became acting Archdeacon of Liverpool part-time, effective 1 February 2023. On 11 June, it was announced she was to become the next archdeacon (leaving St Luke-in-the-City); her substantive appointment was effective upon her collation on 9 September 2023.

=== Campaigning and national roles ===
She has served intermittently as a Proctor in Convocation (i.e. a clergy member of the General Synod of the Church of England) since 2006. She was first elected to the "Universities (Durham & Newcastle)" constituency of the Convocation of York at a by-election during the 2005–2010 quinquennium; and re-elected to the same constituency in 2010, remaining until her departure from chaplaincy in 2012. She was then elected in 2015 as a Proctor for Durham diocese, remaining until her move to Liverpool in 2017; she was again elected in 2021, this time a Proctor for Liverpool diocese.

As of 2021, Threlfall-Holmes has been a member of Women and the Church since training for the priesthood, regularly attends Greenbelt Festival and is a council member of Modern Church. She was a national committee member of WATCH, especially during the campaign for women to be ordained bishops in the Church of England.

In March 2024, Threlfall-Holmes posted on X (formerly Twitter) calling for “anti whiteness” in society, a post which provoked major controversy, with her comments being criticized as "racist" and "divisive". She later told The Telegraph: “I was contributing to a debate about world views, in which ‘whiteness’ does not refer to skin colour per se, but to a way of viewing the world where being white is seen as ‘normal’ and everything else is considered different or lesser.”

== Personal life ==
She is married to chemical engineer Phil and they have three children.

== Selected works ==
- PhD thesis — Monks and Markets: Durham Cathedral Priory 1460–1520 (2005, Oxford University Press; ISBN 978-0-19-925381-4)
- (contributor) North-East England in the Later Middle Ages (Regions and Regionalism in History, 3) (Boydell Press, 2005) ISBN 9781843831273
- Being a Chaplain, edited with Mark Newitt (2011, SPCK; ISBN 978-0-281-06385-7)
- The Essential History of Christianity (2012, SPCK; ISBN 978-0-281-06642-1)
- three poems in Learning to Love, edited by Chris Goan (2014, Proost; ISBN 978-1-906340-28-5)
- The Teenage Prayer Experiment Notebook, with her son Noah Threlfall-Holmes (2015, SPCK; ISBN 978-0-281-07257-6)
  - The Little Book of Prayer Experiments (2016, SPCK; ISBN 978-0-281-07568-3)
  - The Prayer Experiment Notebook, with Mina Munns (2018, SPCK; ISBN 978-0-281-07847-9)
- How To Eat Bread: 21 Nourishing Ways to Read the Bible (2021, John Murray Press; ISBN 978-1-5293-6447-7)
- How to Read the Bible: 21 Ways to Enjoy and Understand Scripture (Hodder Faith, 2025) ISBN 9781399820790
