= St Peter's Church, Parr =

Coordinates: 53.4540°N 2.7009°W

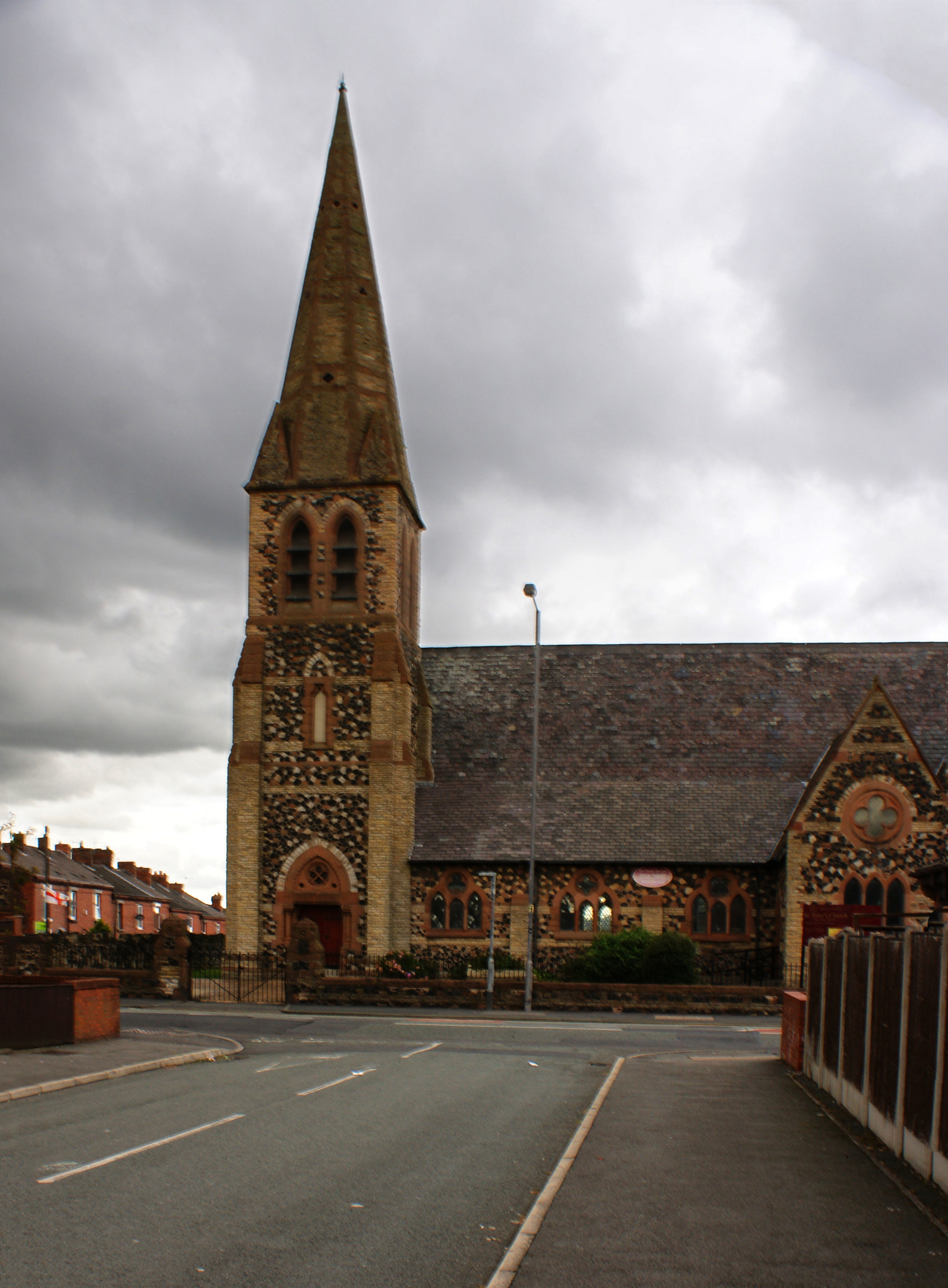
- St Peter's Church, Parr, from the south

- Location in Merseyside
- OS grid reference: SJ 536 955
- Location: Broad Oak Road, Parr, St Helens, Merseyside
- Country: England
- Denomination: Anglican
- Churchmanship: Evangelical
- Website: St Peter, Parr

History
- Status: Parish church
- Dedication: Saint Peter

Architecture
- Functional status: Active
- Heritage designation: Grade II
- Designated: 23 August 1985
- Architect: J. Medland Taylor
- Architectural type: Church
- Style: Gothic Revival
- Groundbreaking: 1864
- Completed: 1865
- Construction cost: £2,600

Specifications
- Materials: Sandstone and copper slag, slate roofs

Administration
- Province: York
- Diocese: Liverpool
- Archdeaconry: Warrington
- Deanery: St Helens
- Parish: St Peter, Parr

Clergy
- Vicar: curate =

St Peter's Church, Parr, is in Broad Oak Road, Parr, St Helens, Merseyside, England. It is an active Anglican parish church in the deanery of St Helens, the archdeaconry of Warrington and the diocese of Liverpool. Its benefice is combined with those of three local churches to form the Parr Team Ministry. The church is recorded in the National Heritage List for England as a designated Grade II listed building.

== History ==
St Peter's replaced an earlier church nearby that was burnt down in 1860. It was designed by J. Medland Taylor, and built in 1864–65. The church cost £2,600.

== Architecture ==
=== Exterior ===
The walls of the church are built in a mixture of red and yellow sandstone and industrial waste in the form of copper slag, and the roofs are slated. Its plan consists of a nave, north and south aisles under catslide roofs, a double south transept, a chancel with a canted east end, a south vestry and a north organ loft (both under catslide roofs), and a tower with a broach spire at the southwest corner. The tower has a south entrance with a pointed tympanum containing a quatrefoil and crossed keys. It has corner buttresses, lancet windows, and paired bell openings. At the top are squat pyramidal pinnacles, and a broach spire surmounted by a weathervane. The window at the west end of the church has two lights and contains plate tracery. Along the wall of the south aisle are triple lancets with roundels above. On the north side the windows are either triple lancets, or double lancets with roundels. The transept is in two bays, each containing a triple lancet over which is a rose window. In the chancel are three windows, each of two lights containing plate tracery.

=== Interior ===
Inside the church are six-bay arcades on round columns, and the chancel arch is carried on round corbels. The font is circular on a circular base, and the pulpit is also circular. The chancel screen is in timber, and dates from about 1920. In the transept is a wall memorial to Revd Abraham Augustus Nunn, the first incumbent of the church, who died in 1889. The two-manual pipe organ was designed by Henry Willis; the date of its installation is unknown.

== Appraisal ==
The church was designated as a Grade II listed building on 23 August 1985. This grade is the lowest of the three gradings given to listed buildings and is applied to "buildings of national importance and special interest". Pollard and Pevsner in the Buildings of England series note that this was an early church design by J. Medland Taylor, and that it is "by no means his best".

== See also ==
- Listed buildings in St Helens, Merseyside
