= St John the Evangelist, Ravenhead =

Coordinates: 53.4412°N 2.7561°W

St John's, Ravenhead
- St John the Evangelist, Ravenhead
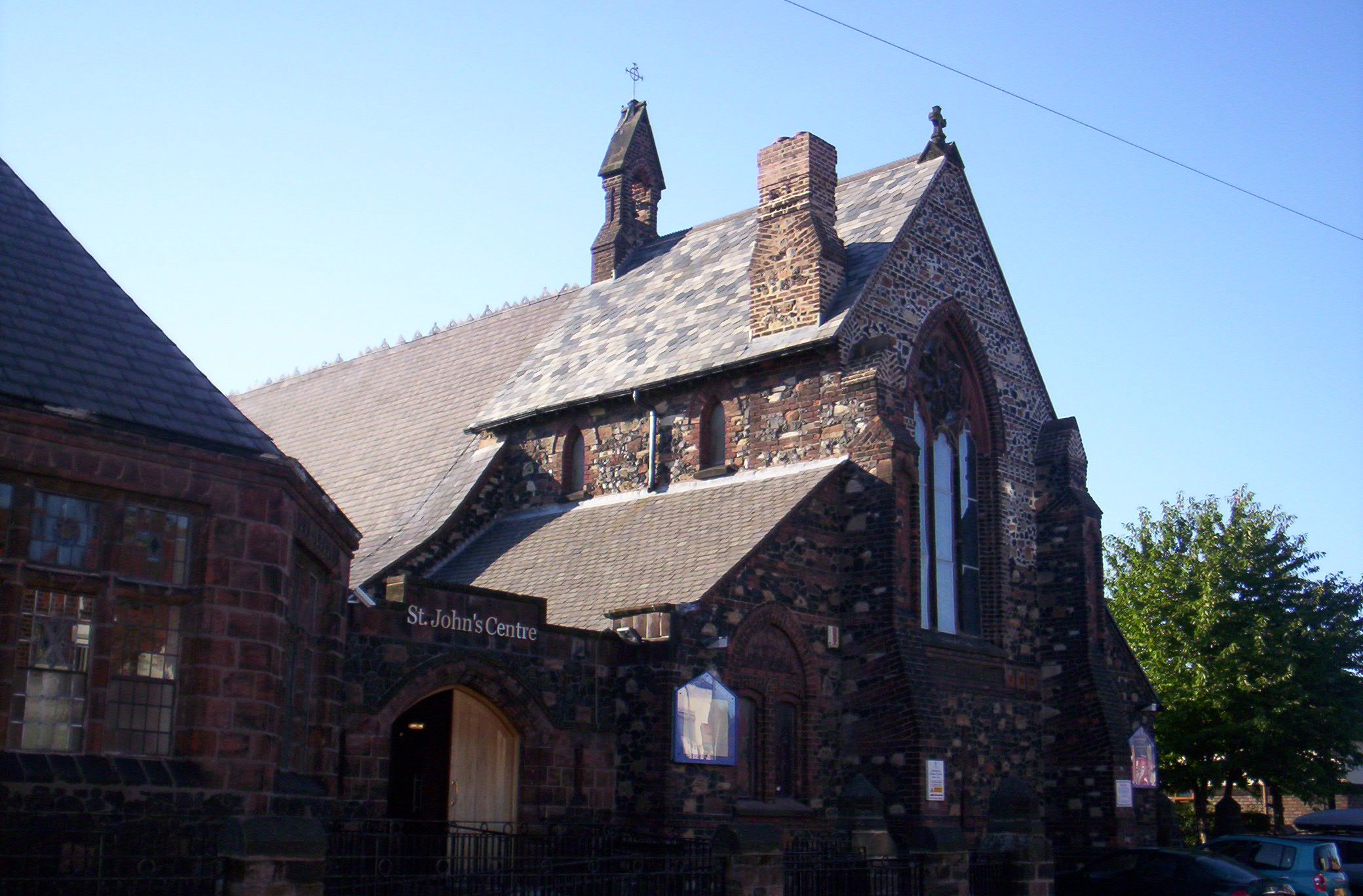

- Location within NW England
- OS grid reference: SJ 49865 94093
- Location: Ravenhead, St. Helens
- Country: England
- Denomination: Anglican
- Website: www.stjohnsravenhead.org.uk

History
- Status: Parish church
- Founded: 1869
- Dedication: St John the Evangelist
- Consecrated: 27 December 1869

Architecture
- Functional status: Active
- Heritage designation: Grade II
- Designated: 23 August 1985
- Architect: Medland & Taylor, Manchester
- Architectural type: Church
- Style: Gothic Revival
- Completed: 1869
- Construction cost: £2,500

Administration
- District: Diocese of Liverpool
- Province: York
- Diocese: Liverpool
- Archdeaconry: St Helens & Warrington
- Deanery: St Helens
- Parish: Ravenhead

Clergy
- Vicar: None at present

St John the Evangelist is a Church of England parish church which serves the parish of Ravenhead in St Helens, Merseyside, England. It is one of the over 200 parishes which together form the Anglican Diocese of Liverpool.

== Centres of worship ==
There is one Anglican church in the parish of Ravenhead. - the parish church of St John the Evangelist. Its mission church, Emmanuel, closed in 2016 when the building and land was sold. The Emmanuel building has now been demolished and the land is the subject of a building development.

== History ==
St John's Church was built and opened in 1869. Following the First World War, a Memorial Hall was built as an annexe to the church in 1924. The mission church, Emmanuel, opened in 1965 as St John's Mission, though previous buildings on the site were associated with the church as far back as the early 1900s as Sunday schools and a vicarage. The most recent building development was of the St John's Community Centre, which opened at the St John's site in 2004. St John's Church is a listed building.

The Emmanuel building and site were sold in 2016.

== Community centre ==
During the 1990s, a survey showed that there was significant demand in the area for improved community facilities. Throughout the following decade, the church raised finances to extend facilities at the main parish church to incorporate a new community centre. A sizeable sum of money was needed and raised through donations and grant making bodies. The St John's Centre opened in January 2004.

== Vicars of Ravenhead ==
Ravenhead has been served by eleven vicars since the opening of St John's Church in 1869. A further minister, Rev. John Angell Jones, was appointed for three months to oversee an interregnum between the death of Rev. H.S. Bolton and the arrival of Rev. J.R. Beresford.

- Rev. Richard Ravenscroft Moore (1869–1884)
- Rev. Harry Sandford Bolton (1884–1923)
- Rev. John Angell Jones (1923, interim)
- Rev. James Richard Beresford (1923–1936)
- Rev. George Goode (1936–1948)
- Rev. Ernest Henshaw (1940–1960)
- Rev. Malcolm Dorrance Whyte (1960–1967)
- Rev. Frank Allred (1967–1975)
- Rev. John Seth Parry (1976–1987)
- Rev. Edward Roy Doran (1988–2009)
- Rev. Terry McFadden (2012 - 2015)
- Rev. Dozie Moneme (2016 - 2020)
- Rev. Gareth Banton (2021 - 2025)

== See also ==
- Listed buildings in St Helens, Merseyside
