= St Cuthbert's Catholic High School =

St Cuthbert's Catholic Academy

Location
- Berrys Lane; Sutton, Merseyside, WA9 3HE; England; 53.443°N 2.701°W

Information
- Type: Voluntary Aided School
- Motto: "Live Life In All Its Fullness"
- Religious affiliation: Roman Catholic
- Established: 1957
- Local authority: St Helens
- Department for Education URN: 104835 Tables
- Ofsted: Reports
- Head of School: Stuart Holland
- Gender: Mixed
- Age: 11 to 16
- Enrolment: 788 as of April 2016
- Colours: Dignity Blue, Hope Orange, Faith Red, Unity Green
- Website: http://www.stcuthberts.com/

St Cuthbert's Catholic High School is a Roman Catholic mixed secondary school situated in St Helens, Merseyside, England.

== History ==
Built in 1957, St Cuthbert's is one of the oldest Secondary Schools in St Helens, famous in the 1960s for its rugby and football achievements. The first Head Teacher was Frederick Grundy. It was founded as a coeducational secondary modern school during the tripartite system era, with the joint support of four parishes.

In 2004, St Cuthbert's became a Business and Enterprise College thanks to funding from Scottish Power Learning. In 2006, St Cuthbert's renamed itself as a College. As part of its specialism, it opened a built-in hotel and café. Lindisfarne House was a hotel built on the school by Farne Limited. It was a National and International Exchange Accommodation Centre offering accommodation for national and international school exchanges, visiting students, amateur sports organizations and other national and international visitors and groups. It had 13 en-suite single or twin rooms on the first floor. In 2004, the Hotel was re-opened by the Earl and Countess of Wessex. The building occupied by the hotel was previously used as a classroom by the school. The hotel closed in 2014.

In 2015 the school was renamed St Cuthbert’s Catholic High School. The building previously occupied by the hotel has been redeveloped to provide seven extra classrooms.

On September 1st 2026, St Cuthbert's Catholic High School joined St Joseph's Multi Academy Trust, subsequently changing the school's name to St Cuthbert's Catholic Academy, A local rival school St Augustine's aka "Guzzies" is also a member of the same trust
