= Church of St Luke, Liverpool =

Former church in Liverpool, England, that was partially destroyed by bombing in WW2

Coordinates: 53.4017°N 2.9752°W

St Luke's Church, Liverpool
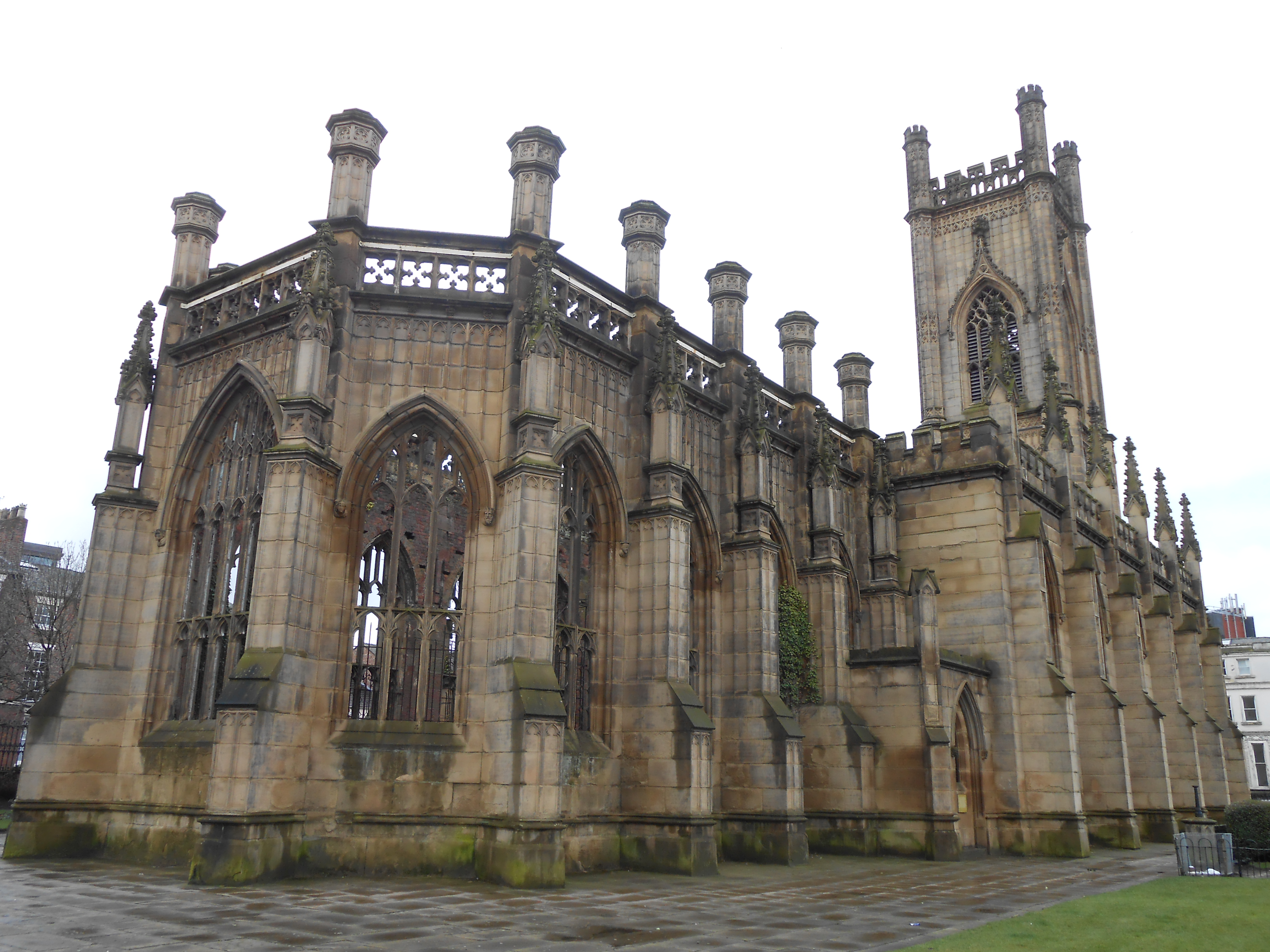
- The church in 2013

- Location in Liverpool
- OS grid reference: SJ 353,899
- Location: Liverpool, England
- Denomination: Anglican

History
- Status: Former parish church

Architecture
- Functional status: Redundant
- Heritage designation: Grade II*
- Designated: 28 June 1952
- Architect(s): John Foster, Sr. John Foster, Jr.
- Style: Gothic Revival (Perpendicular)
- Groundbreaking: 1811
- Completed: 1832

Specifications
- Length: 177 feet 6 inches (54 m)
- Width: 60 feet (18 m)
- Materials: Sandstone

St Luke's Church, more commonly known by locals as the bombed-out church, is a former Anglican parish church in Liverpool, England. It stands on the corner of Berry Street and Leece Street, at the top of Bold Street.

The church was built between 1811 and 1832, and was designed by John Foster, Sr. and John Foster, Jr., father and son who were successive surveyors for the municipal Corporation of Liverpool. In addition to being a parish church, it was also intended to be used as a venue for ceremonial worship by the corporation and as a concert hall.

The church was badly damaged by bombs during the Liverpool Blitz in 1941 and has been a roofless shell ever since, giving rise to its nickname. It now stands as a memorial to those who died in the war, and has also been hired as a venue for exhibitions and events. The church and its surrounding walls, gates, and railings are recorded in the National Heritage List for England as designated Grade II* listed buildings.

== History ==
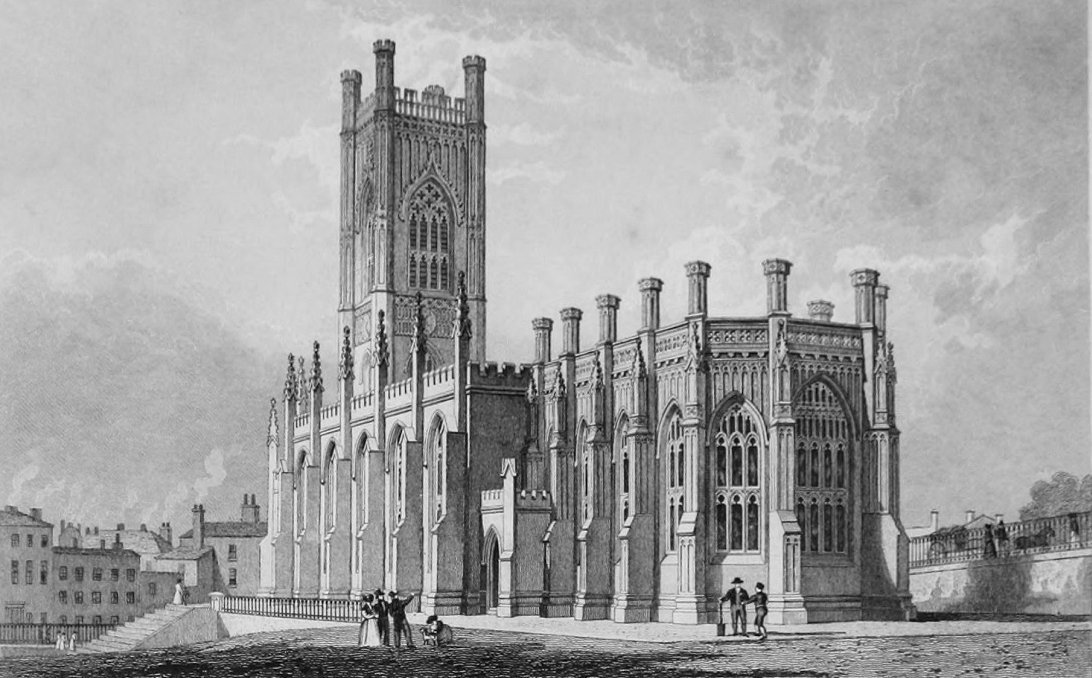
Engraving of St. Luke's Church after completion in 1832.

The site for the church was given by Edward Smith-Stanley, 12th Earl of Derby in 1791 on the condition that the land should never be used for any other purpose than that of a church. Plans for the design of the church were first drawn up in 1802 by John Foster, senior, the surveyor of the Corporation of Liverpool, but the foundation stone was not laid until 9 April 1811. Building work, supervised by Foster, progressed slowly, and during this time the plans were amended to make the building suitable both as a ceremonial place of worship for members of the corporation, and also for use as a concert hall. In 1822 it was decided to add a chancel to the church. Foster's son, also named John, took over the role of Corporation surveyor and continued to supervise the building, making further changes to the design in 1827. The building was finally completed in 1832. The church was known as "the doctor's church" because of its location close to Rodney Street, the home of many doctors. It continued to be used as a concert hall as well as a church until the Philharmonic Hall in Hope Street opened in 1849. Between 1864 and 1873, minor alterations were made to the church by W. & G. Audsley.

On 6 May 1941, during Liverpool's "May Blitz", the church was hit by an incendiary device that caused a large fire, leaving only the burnt-out shell of the former church. It has since been nicknamed "the bombed-out church". It has been decided to maintain the church as it is, a burnt-out shell, as a memorial to those who died as a result of the war. The church was designated as a Grade II* listed building on 28 June 1952. This is the middle of the three grades, which is defined by English Heritage as containing "particularly important buildings of more than special interest".

=== Present day ===
From 2007 to 2014, Urban Strawberry Lunch organised the day-to-day maintenance of St Lukes and coordinated exhibitions and events inside the grounds. In addition to this, they arranged showings of films, and many dance, poetry, and drama performances.

In 2014, Ambrose Reynolds, former artistic director for Urban Strawberry Lunch, joined other members of the community to create a new organisation, 'Bombed Out Church'; named after the building's colloquial name. They have since continued the work started by USL, maintaining the church as a creative hub for the local community.

Since 1981, the bombed out church has been commemorated in the name of the local Church of England parish: As of June 2023, the St Luke-in-the-City team parish consists of St Bride's Church, Liverpool; the Church of St Dunstan, Liverpool; St Michael-in-the-City; and OpenTable, an LGBTQIA+ fresh expression.

== Architecture ==
=== Lost features ===
Originally there were two aisles, and the nave had a groined ceiling, which was "richly ornamented". The whole roof and the arcades separating the aisles from the nave were lost as a result of the bomb damage. The roof of the tower has also been lost. Many of the windows contained stained glass, but now only fragments of glass remain. There was a ring of eight bells, cast in 1818 by William Dobson of Downham Market at a cost of £645 (equivalent to £50,000 in 2025). As a result of the fire in 1941, five of the bells fell from the tower and the other three were badly cracked. The clock, made by Roskell's of Derby, also fell to the ground. The three-manual pipe organ was also destroyed in the fire. It had been made by Gray and Davison in 1865, and improvements had been made to it by Rushworth and Dreaper in 1902.

=== Remaining structure ===
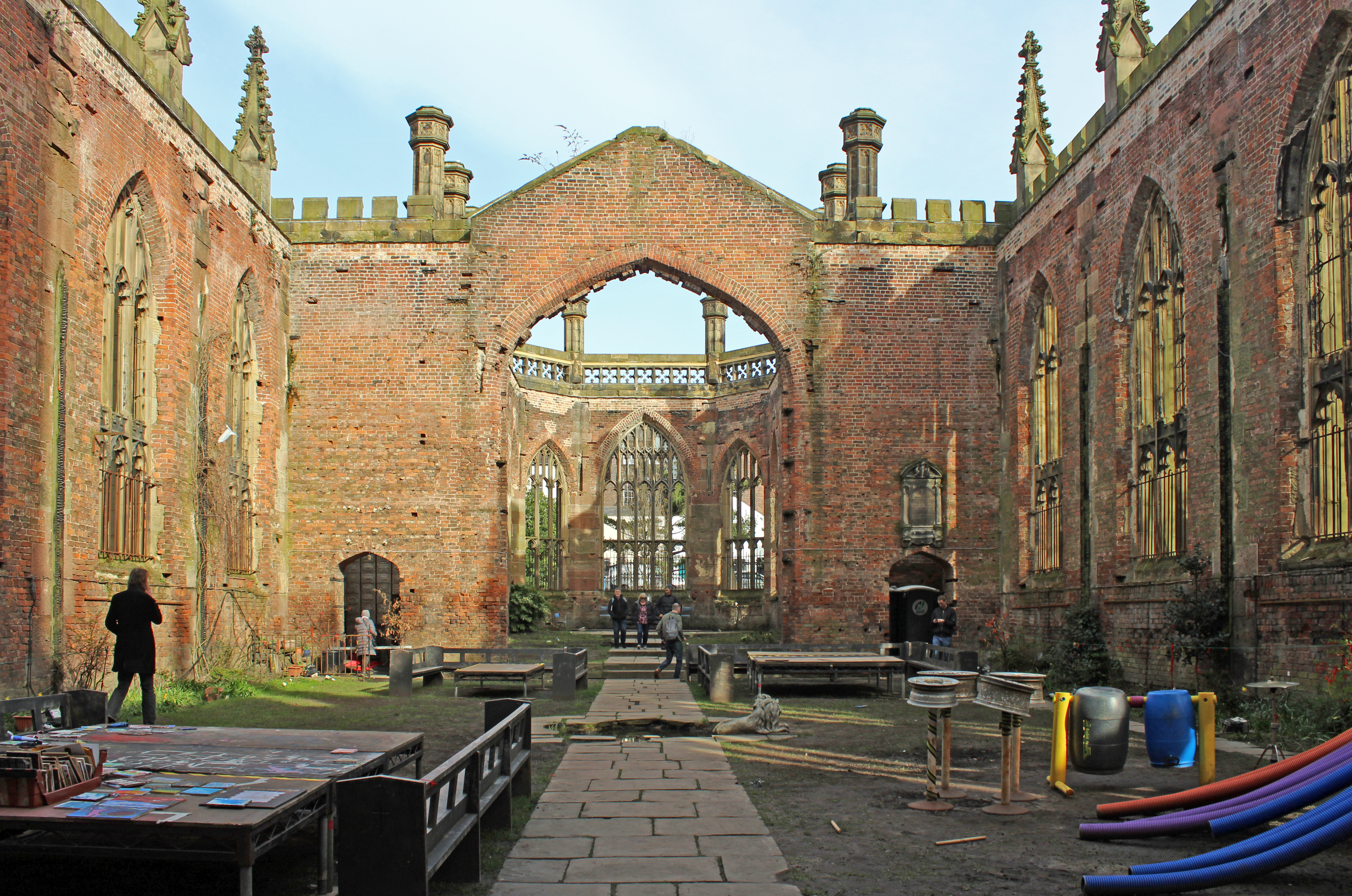
View east along the nave

St Luke's is constructed in ashlar sandstone, and is in Perpendicular style. Its plan currently consists of a five-bay nave, a four-bay chancel with an apsidal end, and a west tower. There are porches in the angles between the tower and the nave, and between the nave and the chancel. The tower is in three stages, with polygonal buttresses at the corners. The bottom stage of the tower contains a west entrance. In the middle stage, on all sides, are three-light windows, a traceried frieze, and a clock face. In the top stage are four-light windows under ogival hood moulds. At the summit of the tower is a battlemented parapet, with flat-headed pinnacles at the corners. Within the tower is the surviving cast iron bell frame, made in 1828 by George Gilliband. This is considered to be the first metal bell frame to be made in the world. Along the sides of the nave are five three-light windows, separated by panelled buttresses that rise to crocketed pinnacles. The windows at the sides of the chancel also have three lights, and the east window has five lights. The chancel buttresses rise to octagonal finials with flat tops. Inside the church is a surviving brick chancel arch. Under the church is a crypt, which is not accessible to the general public. One of its windows has retained stained glass that depicts a liver bird.

== External features ==
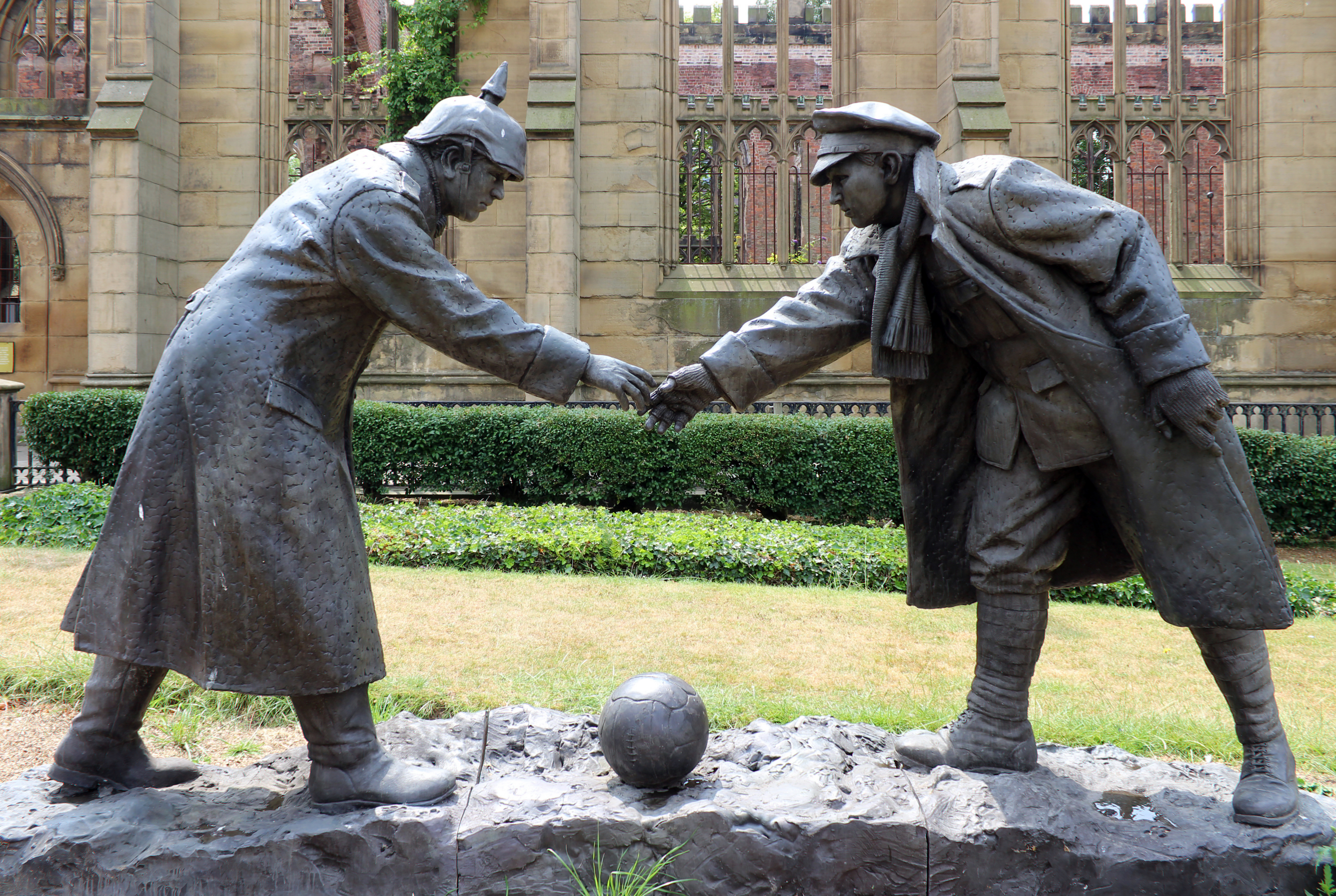
Christmas truce sculpture

The area around the church has never been used for burials, and was laid out as a garden in 1885. Originally it was enclosed by a solid wall, with doorways under pointed arches. This was replaced between 1829 and 1832 by John Foster, junior, by the current enclosure. This consists of cast iron railings on sandstone plinth walls, and cast iron gates between sandstone piers. Steps lead down on all sides to the surrounding streets. The gate piers are panelled, and have crocketed heads. The whole structure was designated as a Grade II* listed building on 14 March 1975. In the churchyard is the Irish Famine Memorial, sculpted by Éamonn O'Docherty, which has been erected to commemorate those who died as a result of the Irish Famine in the middle of the 19th century. It was opened by the President of Ireland in 1998, and carries inscriptions in Gaelic and in English. There is also a Christmas truce sculpture (2014), known as "All Together Now" by Andy Edwards in the garden, depicting a British and German soldier commencing a football game at Christmas 1914.

== See also ==
- Grade II* listed buildings in Merseyside
