= St Michael's Church, Huyton =

St Michael's Church
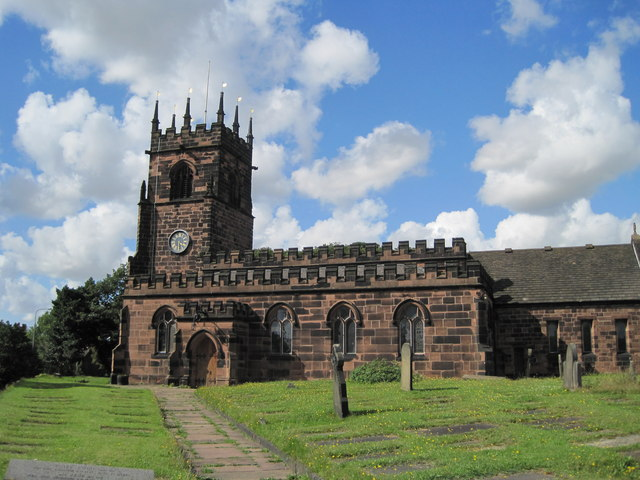
- St Michael's Church, Huyton
- St Michael's Church
- 53.41399°N 2.84004°W
- OS grid reference: SJ 44267 91130
- Location: Huyton, Knowsley, Merseyside
- Country: England
- Denomination: Anglican

History
- Status: Parish church

Architecture
- Heritage designation: Grade II*
- Architectural type: Church

Administration
- Diocese: Liverpool
- Archdeaconry: Liverpool

St Michael's Church is a Grade II* listed Anglican Church located in Huyton, Merseyside, England. With the building itself dating from around the 14th Century the church's actual interior comprises an amalgamation of features that are much older or were subsequently added between the 15th-19th centuries. The church remains active and forms part of the Church of England's Diocese of Liverpool.

== History ==
According to its records a church has existed on the site since Anglo-Saxon times and the current building is built upon the original's foundations. In 1872 during restoration fragments of columns and a font thought to be of Anglo-Saxon or early Norman origin were discovered.
