= St Mary's Church, Lower Ince =

Church in Greater Manchester, England

Coordinates: 53.5333°N 2.6175°W

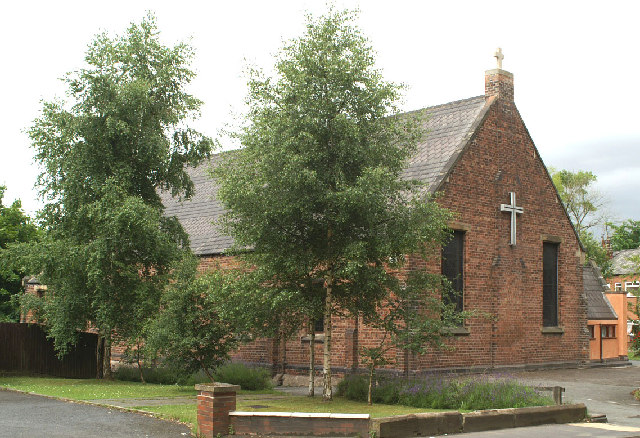
Present church

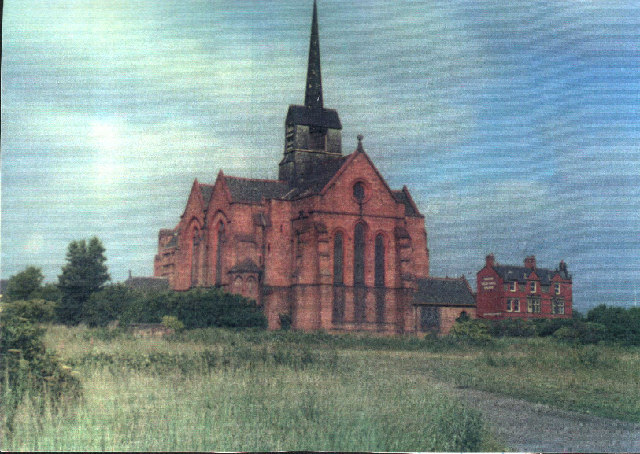
Old St Mary's

St Mary's Church is in Warrington Road, Lower Ince, Ince-in-Makerfield, Wigan, Greater Manchester, England. It is an active Anglican parish church in the deanery of Wigan, the archdeaconry of Warrington, and the diocese of Liverpool.

== Old church ==
The previous church was built in 1887, and designed by the Lancaster architects Paley, Austin and Paley. Two local industrialists donated £5,000 (equivalent to £700,000 in 2023) each to its cost. The church was built in red brick, and was distinguished by having a bellcote at the east end by a tall, slender spirelet. It was also unusual in that it had narrow aisles, forming passages down the sides of the church. The church was built on a coalfield, and subsequently suffered damage from subsidence, which led to its demolition in 1978. Pollard and Pevsner in the Buildings of England series describe it as having been a "grand" church. Brandwood et al state that the practice designed a number of urban churches around this time, and they consider that this was the most important, with "real character and individuality".

== Present church ==
The new church was converted from a school built in the 1870s. It contains some stained glass dating from about 1889 and from 1923, which was moved from the old church and re-set in the present church.

== See also ==
- List of works by Paley, Austin and Paley
