= Ravenhead =

Coordinates: 53.443°N 2.752°W

- Location within Merseyside
- OS grid reference: SJ505945
- Metropolitan borough: St Helens
- Metropolitan county: Merseyside
- Region: North West
- Country: England
- Sovereign state: United Kingdom
- Post town: St. Helens
- Postcode district: WA10
- Dialling code: 01744
- Police: Merseyside
- Fire: Merseyside
- Ambulance: North West
- UK Parliament: St Helens South and Whiston

Ravenhead is an area of St Helens, Merseyside, in northwest England. It is bordered by Thatto Heath, Sutton and the town centre. The area is thought to take its name from a farm once located nearby (Ravenhead Farm), while the 'head' portion of the name represents its location at one of the higher points of the town. In this respect, Ravenhead joins other local placenames such as Burtonhead, Micklehead and Eltonhead.

== Local facilities ==
Shops in the main residential area of Ravenhead are limited to a newsagent (Ravenhead), computer repair store (Thatto Heath) and a Spar local store (Toll-Bar). There is also a laundry (business not for individual use) and a 'Fives Football Centre' (closed down), opened by BBC television pundit and former England footballer Alan Shearer.

St. John's Centre operates out of St. John's Parish Church (or Ravenhead Church as locals call it) and runs various community activities. Alexandra Court is a residential housing care home, run by Arena Options Ltd for the over 65s.

== Ravenhead Retail Park ==
The Ravenhead Retail Park, to the north of Ravenhead near the town centre, is an out of town shopping area featuring a number of high-street outlets. Amongst these are B&Q and CurrysPCWorld, both of which at the time of building were the largest of the chain's stores in the country. Since the initial build, the retail park has been extended and now includes stores such as Bath Store, Pets At Home and Boots Pharmacy. It is rated amongst the top 20 retail parks in the country.

The presence of the retail park means Ravenhead boasts popular food outlets such as Burger King, Frankie and Bennys, Subway and a nearby McDonald's.

== Religion ==
The ecclesiastical parish of Ravenhead is a Church of England parish, formed on 19 August 1870 by Order of Council. Though there have been some subsequent boundary changes to the parish, it still encompasses some of the neighbouring areas of Thatto Heath, Sutton Heath and Nutgrove.

Ravenhead is served by the Church of England parish church of St. John the Evangelist. St. Johns has a smaller, sister church, Emmanuel in neighbouring Thatto Heath. The church is also the home to St. John's Centre - a community outreach project which hosts youth activities, community lunches and various other organised events.

The church is part of the Eccleston Team, which partners St. John's & Emmanuel with St. Matthew, Thatto Heath; St. Luke, Eccleston; St. James, Eccleston and Christ Church, Eccleston. This means the benefice that the churches fall within are significantly wider than the parish boundary.

There is an Independent Methodist Church in West Street.

== Industry ==
Ravenhead played a significant part in the development of St Helens' glass industry, as the base for Pilkington's head office. and the Ravenhead Glass factory. Ravenhead Glass has since closed down, indicative of the decline in the glass industry in the town, and the former Head Office of Pilkington has been transformed into serviced office space, following the acquisition of Pilkington by Nippon Sheet Glass in 2006.

Pilkington's head office was formerly the home of Pilkington's Glass Museum, however it was closed in 2005 and incorporated into the World Of Glass museum in the town centre.

Formerly Ravenhead was home to Ravenhead Coal Mine. It along with numerous small pits were served by private rail lines running off from the main branch line of the Liverpool line, feeding down to the canal and direct to the city centre.
