= Parr, St Helens =

Historic township in Merseyside, England

Coordinates: 53.451°N 2.715°W

Parr
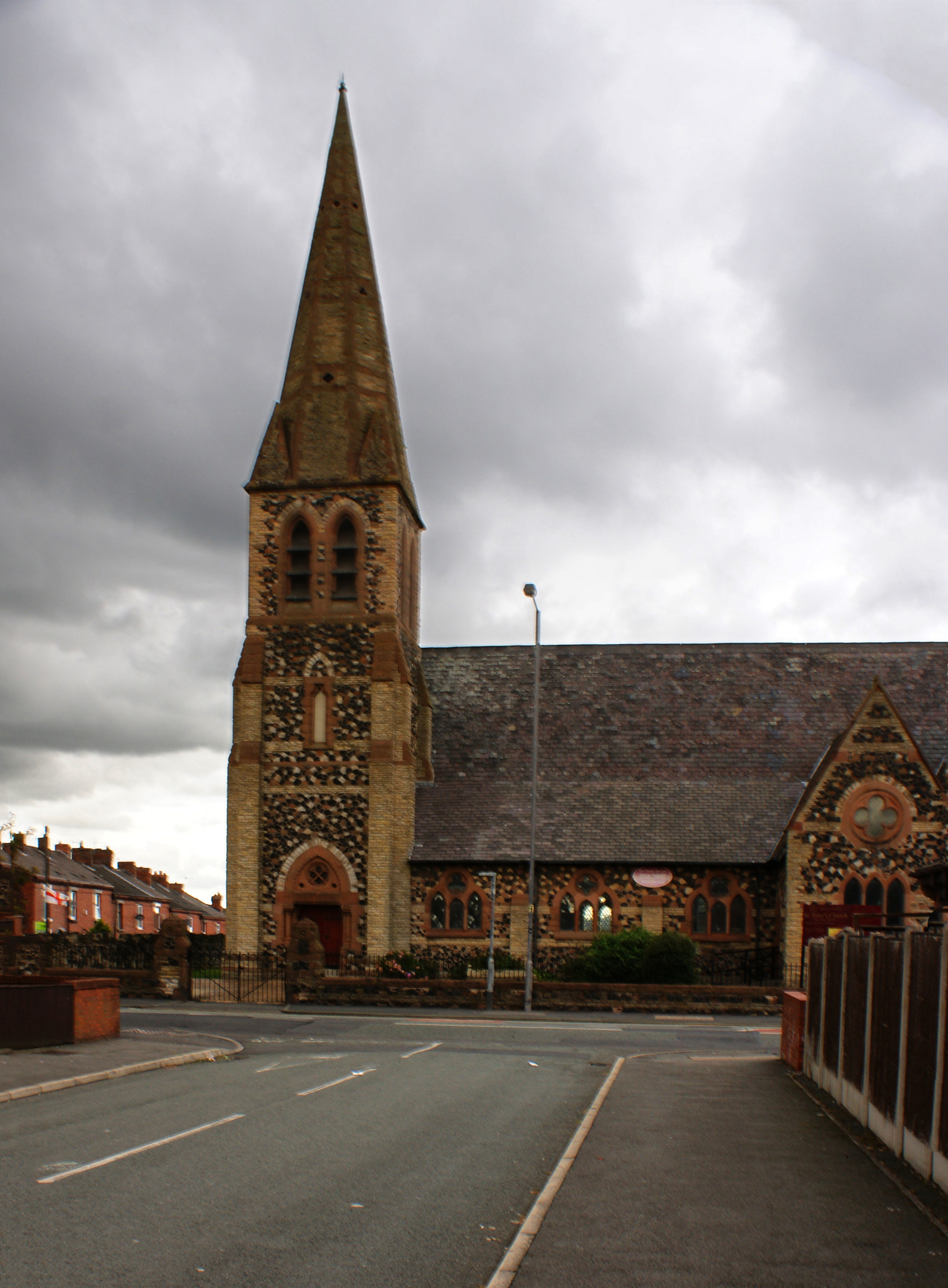
- St Peter's Church, Parr

- Location within Merseyside
- Population: 12,199 (2011.Ward)
- OS grid reference: SJ525951
- Metropolitan borough: St Helens
- Metropolitan county: Merseyside
- Region: North West
- Country: England
- Sovereign state: United Kingdom
- Post town: ST. HELENS
- Postcode district: WA9
- Dialling code: 01744
- Police: Merseyside
- Fire: Merseyside
- Ambulance: North West
- UK Parliament: St Helens North

Parr is a ward and historic township, located towards the eastern side of the town of St. Helens, in the county of Merseyside, England. The population of the ward at the 2011 census was 12,199. The township dates back to the West Derby hundred district from the 12th century.

== History ==
In the mid 14th century, the manor of Parr was held by William Dacre, 2nd Baron Dacre. The manor was divided initially by two local families, documented as "Halsall de Parr" and the "de Parr". The Halsall family were associated with the area for several generations, with second to last being Sir Thomas Parr, the father of Henry VIII's final wife Catherine Parr. The final descendent, Thomas's son, William Parr, 1st Marquess of Northampton died without an heir meaning the lands were conveyed back to the crown. The family seat was Parr Hall, sited close to where Frodsham Drive is today.

Parr was a largely wooded area of heath through much of its early history. It was bisected by the Sankey Brook and bordered Black Brook to the west and the large moss to the south that divided it from Sutton. The area was already a rich source of timber and peat, and shallow pits revealed easily winnable coal and New Red Sandstone just beneath the surface. The area rapidly became dotted with Bell pits. The industrial revolution brought the development of the canals and railways. The largest of such, the Sankey Canal, also known as the Sankey Brook Navigation, opened in 1757, and ran from close to the mouth of Sankey Brook at the River Mersey along the Sankey Valley through an area known colloquially as The Flash, and into the Broad Oak Basin, ending north east of St Helens. Later extensions were made at the Mersey end, firstly to Fiddlers Ferry, then to Widnes, and at the northern end, where it was extended into what became the centre of St Helens.

Parr was formerly a township and chapelry in the parish of Prescot, in 1866 Parr became a separate civil parish, on 25 March 1894 the parish was abolished and merged with St Helens. In 1891 the parish had a population of 13,203.

When visited in the early 1900's, the historians William Farrer and J Brownbill described Parr as "a township unpleasing to the eye, where the natural amenities have been replaced by everything unlovely that man could devise" remarking how all the natural landscape had been given over to industry. They describe "collieries, chemical and ironworks" and "huge banks and heaps of refuse"

In 1869 Parr was one of four townships that joined together, for administrative purposes, to become St. Helens, the others being Sutton, Eccleston and Windle.

St Peter's Church was built in 1864-65 to the designs of J. Medland Taylor: the stonework is in three different colours and there is a broach spire.

The area was overlooked by Bold Power Station across "The Moss" until the decommissioned station was demolished in the late 90s.

== Housing ==
The area of Parr is predominately social housing, represented by three main stages of developments. Waring Avenue Estate (developed 1950s / 60s), Concourse Way (colloquially referred to as Cement City in reference to its Pebble Dash rendering) developed in the 1960s, The Pennine Drive Estate developed in the 1950s. Amidst these estates remain the more traditional buildings dating to the 1930s, along with Terrace Housing (1890s onwards) and private developments.

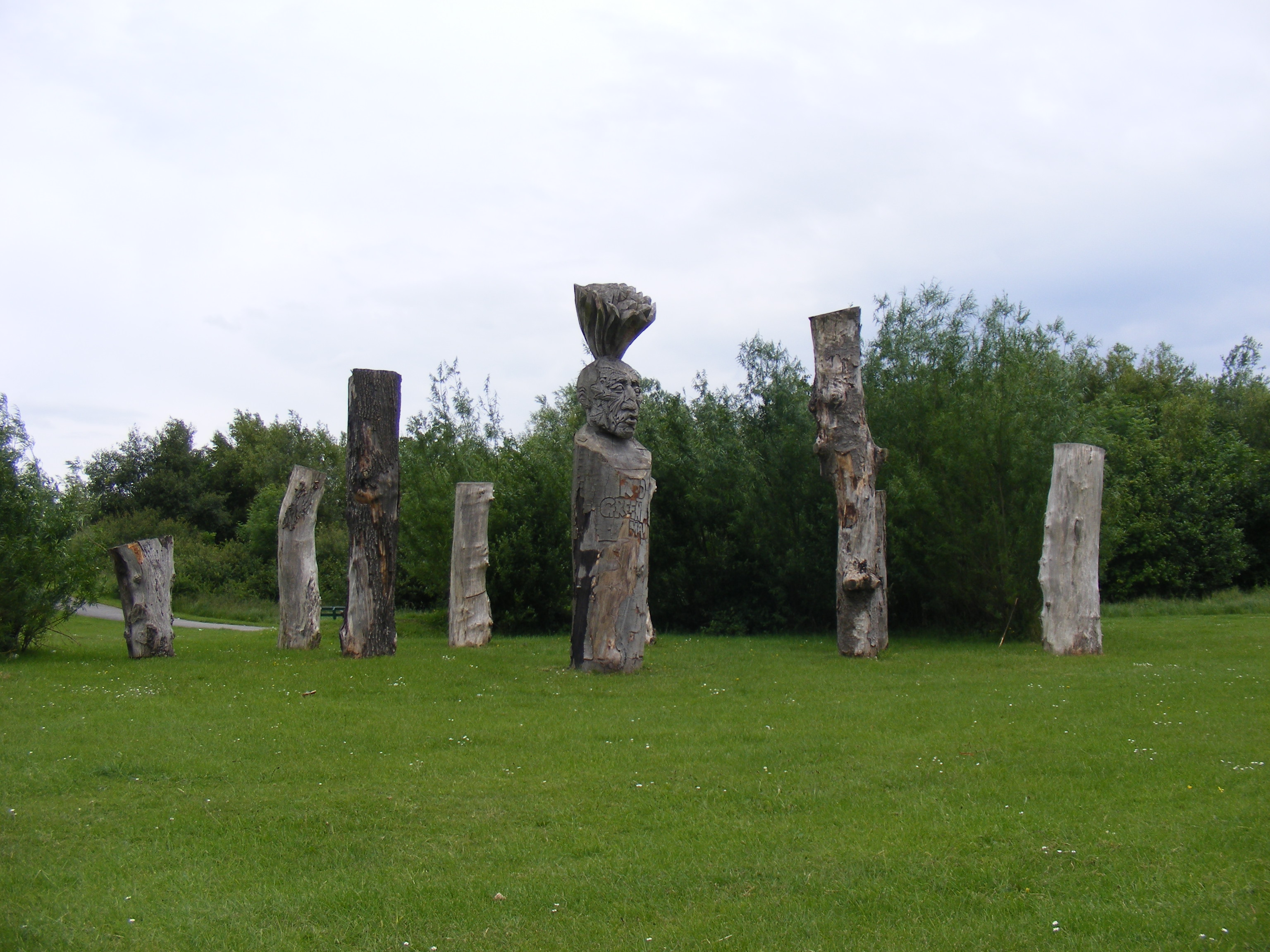
"The Green Man" art installation on The Duckeries in Parr

The area succumbed to social problems linked to poverty and an aging population during the 1980s with the collapse of several significant employers in St. Helens. Its housing remains markedly cheaper than other areas of St. Helens due to a commonly perceived stigma of high crime and low education standards.

Since 2006 the area, as well as other areas of St. Helens in coordination with Re:new Neighbourhood Management Project, has been targeted for regeneration. Parr was selected for the Pilot scheme and has seen increased funding to local parks and green spaces (The Duckeries for instance, formerly a slag heap, is now in the process of returning the land to its marshy origins, whilst new multi-sporting facilities and park equipment have been added to Gaskell Park and others).

Recently a new private housing development of detached houses, terraced homes, and flats was completed along Newton Road and adjacent to the Derbyshire Hill area, with more new-builds developed on Ashtons Green Drive, and Fleet Lane.

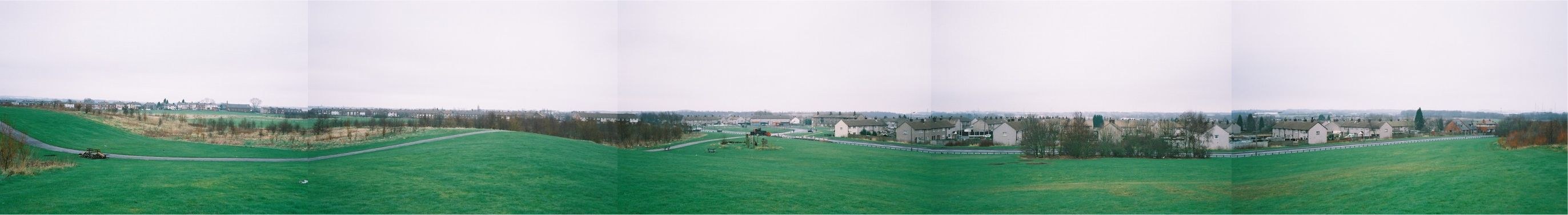
A panorama of Parr taken from atop The Duckeries local greenspace

== Transport ==
Parr has three main access routes. The A572 (Newton Road) linking to Newton-le-Willows, the A572 (Parr Stocks Road), a direct route into St Helens town centre and the B5204 towards Burtonwood, Warrington.

== Education ==
Primary education in the area is served by Allanson Street Primary, Broad Oak Primary and Holy Spirit Catholic Primary School.

There are currently no non-denominational high schools located in Parr, since the closure of Parr High School. St. Cuthbert's is the only secondary establishment, resting on the junction of Watery Lane and Berry's Lane and the boundary of Sutton (their official address is in fact "Sutton"). St. Augustine's is located in nearby Blackbrook.

After Parr High School closed, many students attend Outwood Academy Haydock. The old site of Parr High was redeveloped into the special educational needs Lansbury Bridge School (ages 4–14) and Mill Green School (ages 14–19).

== Sport ==
There are no professional sporting clubs or organisations in Parr. The area boasts a series of playing fields where the local combination football league and rugby fixtures are played as well. One of St. Helens' swimming baths is also located in the area.

Blackbrook A.R.L.F.C. is situated in the Blackbrook area of Parr.

== Notable people ==
2023 PDC World Darts Number 1 Michael Smith lived in Cherry Tree Drive throughout his childhood and attended St Cuthbert's. The wealthy entrepreneur John Rylands was born in Parr in 1801. Martin Murray also grew up in the area.
