= St Bride's Church, Liverpool =

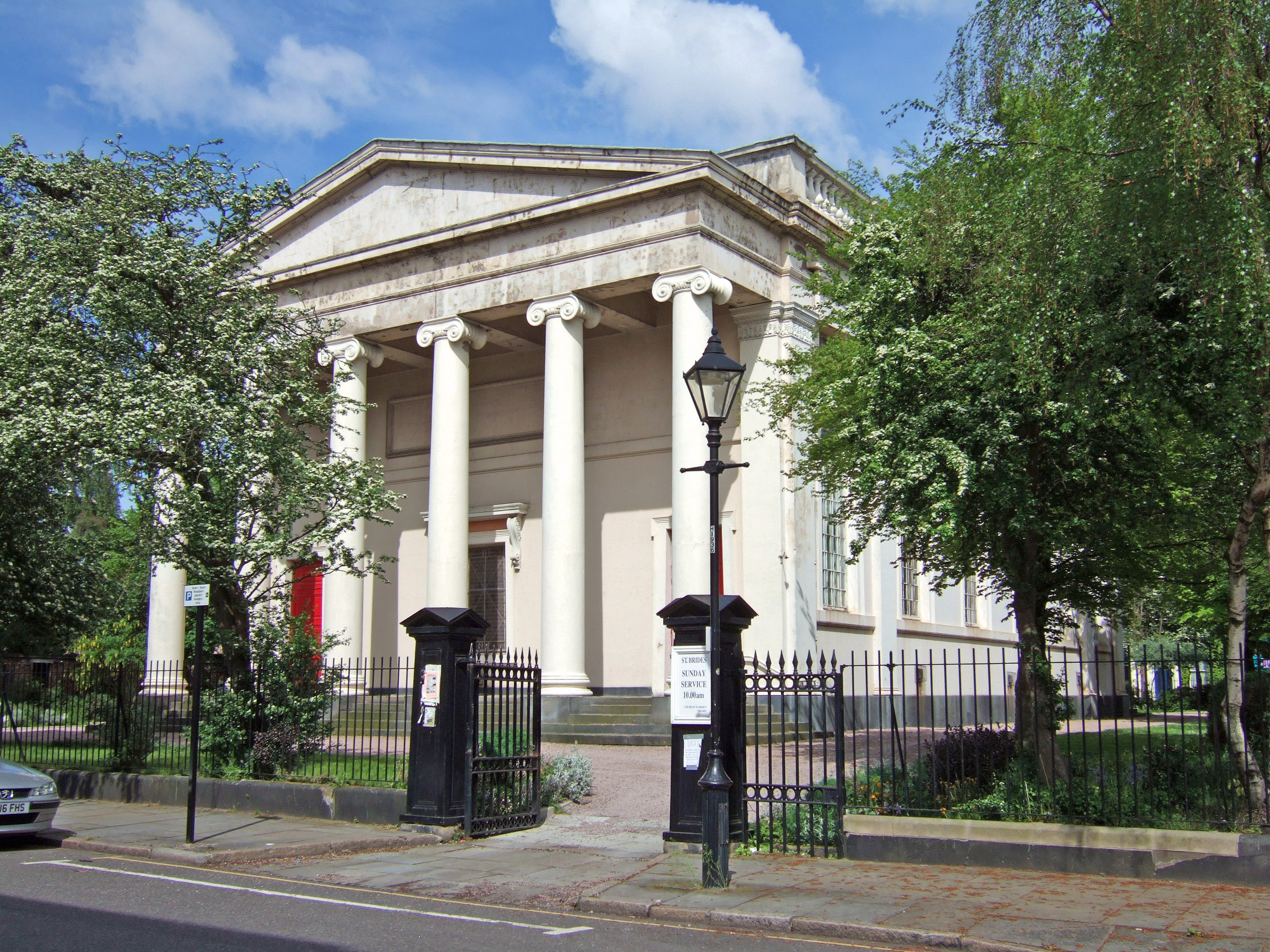
- St Bride's Church, Percy Street, Liverpool

- Location within Merseyside
- 53.397°N 2.969°W
- OS grid reference: SJ 35661 89375
- Location: Percy Street, Canning, Liverpool
- Country: England
- Denomination: Church of England
- Churchmanship: Progressive / Inclusive Church
- Website: stbridesliverpool.co.uk

History
- Status: Active
- Dedication: St Bride
- Consecrated: 29 December 1830

Architecture
- Functional status: Parish church
- Heritage designation: Grade II* listed building
- Designated: 28 June 1952
- Architect: Samuel Rowland
- Style: Neoclassical
- Years built: 1829–1831

Administration
- Diocese: Diocese of Liverpool
- Archdeaconry: Archdeaconry of Liverpool
- Deanery: Deanery of Toxteth & Wavertree
- Parish: St. Luke in the City Team

St Bride's Church, Canning, Liverpool, England, is a Church of England parish church.

== History and architecture ==
St Bride's was designed by Samuel Rowland. Building work started on 29 August 1829 and was the church consecrated on 29 December 1830. It was built for the Reverend James Haldane Stewart and is a Grade II* listed building.

It is deemed the best surviving Neoclassical church in Liverpool. It is temple-like in appearance and has a monumental portico of six unfluted Ionic columns across the west end. The east window is of stained glass in a Renaissance style and was installed in about 1905. In the chancel there is a monument to Rev Mr Stewart who died in 1854. There is another monument to Mr WM Foster, his wife and servant, who all drowned in the wreck of the steamship Rothsay Castle in 1831.

== Present day ==
As well as continuing to hold services, the building has hosted several events as part of the Liverpool Biennial art festival as well as using for a drop-in for several main charities in Liverpool such as Refugee Women Connect, Micah and British Red Cross. It is regularly used as a venue for music concerts and has a professional recording studio.

== See also ==
- Architecture of Liverpool

== Sources ==
- Buildings of Liverpool. Liverpool: Liverpool Heritage Bureau. 1978.
- Sharples, Joseph (2003). Liverpool. Pevsner City Guides. New Haven, London: Yale University Press. ISBN 978-0-300-10258-1.
