= Church of St Dunstan, Liverpool =

Coordinates: 53.3990°N 2.9435°W

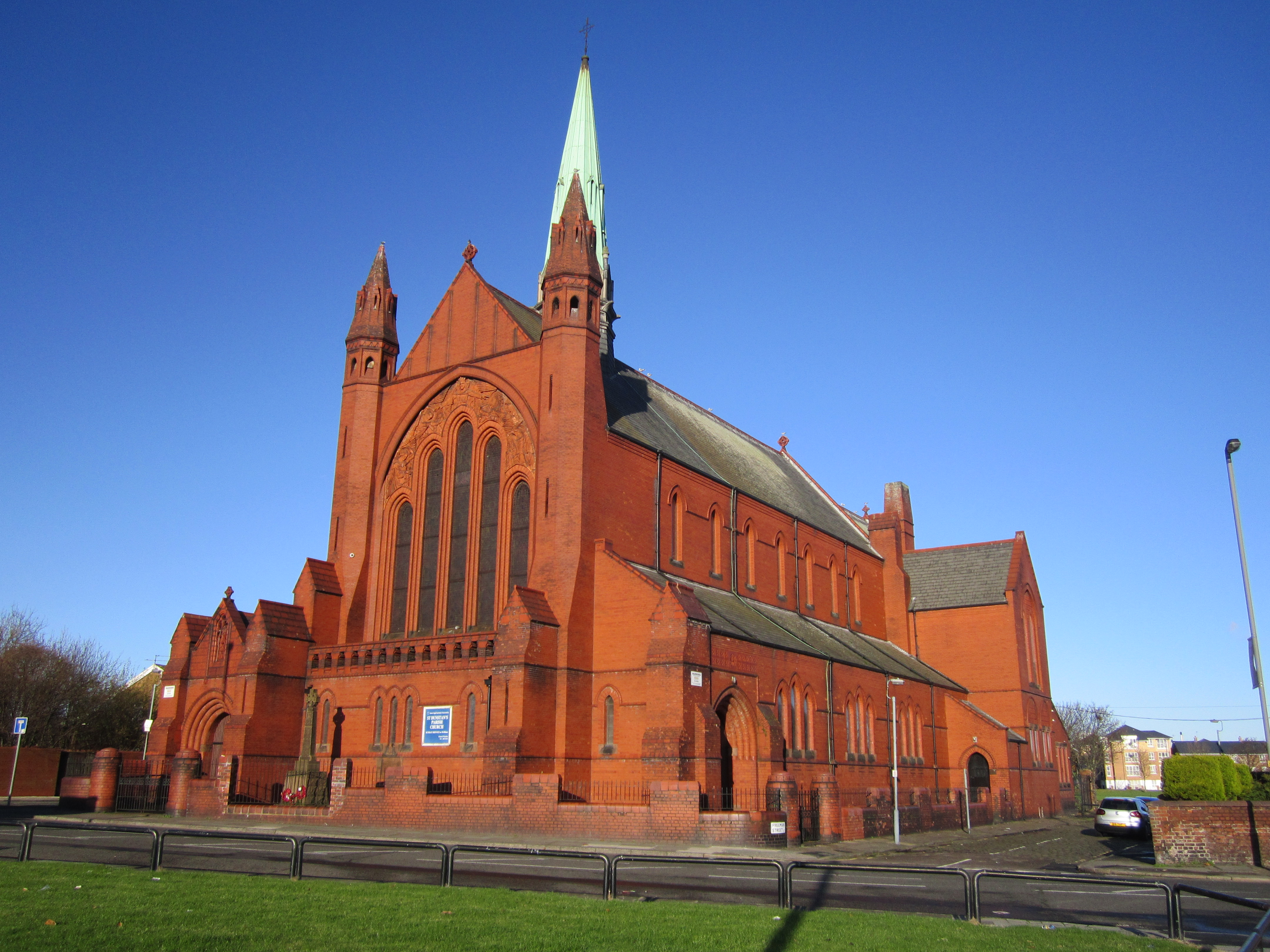
- Church of St Dunstan, Liverpool, from the southwest

- Location in Merseyside
- OS grid reference: SJ 374 895
- Location: Earle Road, Edge Hill, Liverpool
- Country: England
- Denomination: Anglican
- Churchmanship: Liberal Catholic
- Website: St Dunstan, Liverpool

History
- Status: Part of the Team Parish of St Luke in the City
- Dedication: Saint Dunstan
- Consecrated: 18 May 1889

Architecture
- Functional status: Active
- Heritage designation: Grade II*
- Designated: 14 March 1975
- Architect(s): Aldridge and Deacon
- Architectural type: Church
- Style: Gothic Revival
- Groundbreaking: 1886
- Completed: 1889

Specifications
- Materials: Brick, slate roof

Administration
- Province: York
- Diocese: Liverpool
- Archdeaconry: Liverpool
- Deanery: Toxteth and Wavertree
- Parish: St. Luke in the City Team

Clergy
- Rector: Revd Dr Miranda Threlfall-Holmes

The Church of St Dunstan is in Earle Road, Edge Hill, Liverpool, England. It is an active Anglican church in the deanery of Toxteth and Wavertree, the archdeaconry of Liverpool, and the diocese of Liverpool. Its benefice is united with two other local churches to form the Team Parish of St Luke in the City. The church is recorded in the National Heritage List for England as a designated Grade II* listed building.

== History ==
The church was built between 1886 and 1889, and designed by Charles Aldridge and Charles Deacon. It was built for the family of Thomas Earle, and consecrated on 18 May 1889. The interior of the church was re-ordered in 1967, when an altar was placed in the nave and the north chapel was glazed in.

== Architecture ==
St Dunstan's is constructed in red Ruabon brick and has a slate roof. Its plan consists of a five bay nave with a clerestory and a northwest baptistry, north and south aisles, north and south porches, and a two-bay chancel with a north chapel and a south transept acting as an organ loft. Towards the west end of the church is a copper-covered flèche containing two-light bell openings. At the west end is the baptistry, and a west window consisting of five stepped lancets, which are flanked by octagonal turrets with pyramidal roofs containing lucarnes. In the arch above the windows are carved symbols of the Evangelists, and the figure of Christ. Along the sides of the church are lancet windows, three to each bay of the aisles, and one to each bay of the clerestory. Above the entrance to the north porch is a diapered gable containing a statue of Saint Dunstan in a niche. The east window consists of three stepped lancets.

Inside the church the five-bay arcade is carried on round stone piers. A frieze runs along the top of the arcade. Other than the stone piers, the rest of the interior is in brick. The alabaster reredos, and the wrought iron lectern were designed by Deacon. Between the nave and the chancel is an iron screen. Also in the church are brass plaques to the memory of members of the Earle family. In the west window is stained glass by Burlison and Grylls. The three-manual pipe organ was built in about 1880 by Henry Willis, but by 2002 it had become unplayable.

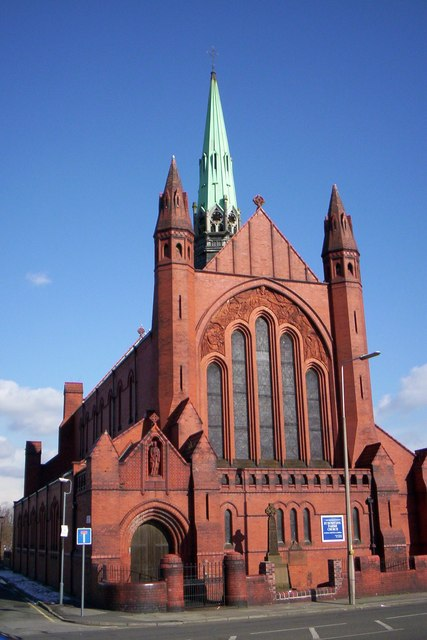
West front

Commenting on the design, the description in the National Heritage List for England says it is a "severe but handsome design". Pollard and Pevsner in the Buildings of England series refer to the west front as "impressive if rather curious", and say that the "interior impresses with gloomy atmosphere".

== Present day ==
As of 2015, St Dunstan's holds services every Sunday morning. The church was reordered in 2014.

== See also ==
- Grade II* listed buildings in Merseyside
