= William Francis Taylor =

William Francis Taylor may refer to:

- Francis Taylor, 1st Baron Maenan (1854–1951), full name William Francis Kyffin Taylor
- William Taylor (Archdeacon of Liverpool) (1820–1906), full name William Francis Taylor
