= Percy Baker =

Percy Baker can refer to:

- Percy Baker (archdeacon) (1871–1947), Archdeacon of Warrington
- Percy Baker (cricketer) (1874–1939), English cricketer
- Percy Baker (gymnast) (1880–1957), Welsh gymnast
- Edwin Percy Baker (1895–1990), English lawn and indoor bowler
- Percy Baker (politician), member of the Louisiana House of Representatives for Bossier County
