= Benjamin Clarke =

Benjamin or Ben Clarke may refer to:

- Benjamin Clarke (priest) (died 1895), archdeacon of Liverpool
- Ben Clarke (born 1968), rugby player
- Ben Clarke (footballer, born 1911) (1911–1981), Northern Irish footballer
- Ben Clarke (footgolf) (born 1991), English footgolf player
- Ben Clarke (politician) (1928–2026), American politician, member of the Colorado House of Representatives

== See also ==
- Benjamin Clark (disambiguation)
