= Darren Clarke =

Northern Irish professional golfer (born 1968)

Darren Clarke OBE
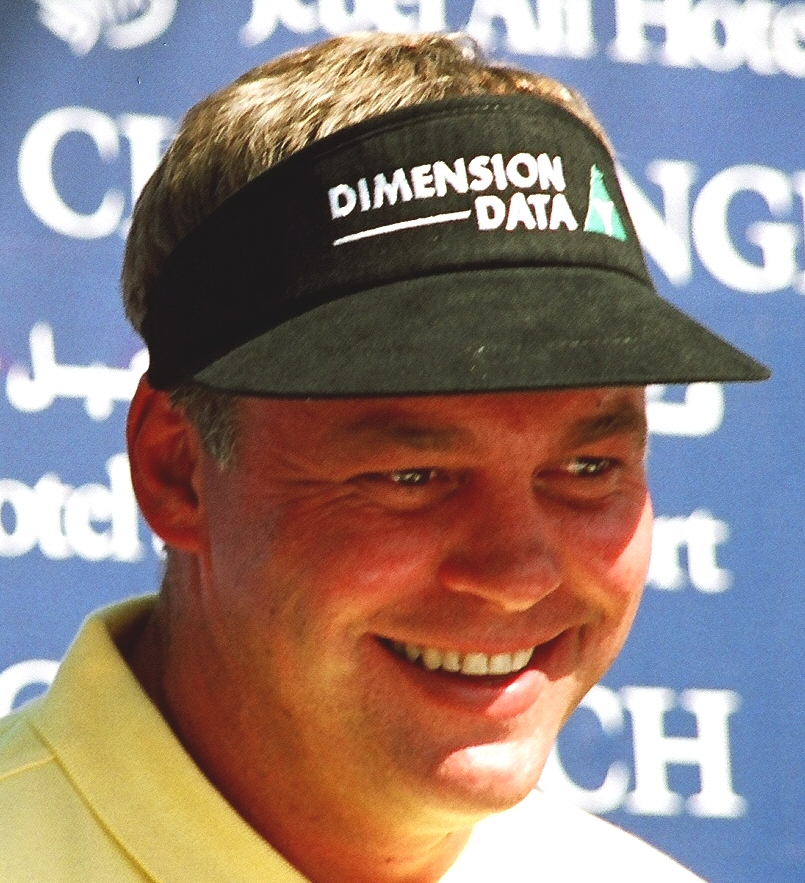

Personal information
- Full name: Darren Christopher Clarke
- Nationality: Northern Ireland
- Born: 14 August 1968 (age 58) Dungannon, County Tyrone, Northern Ireland
- Height: 6 ft 2 in (1.88 m)
- Weight: 250 lb (110 kg; 18 st)
- Spouses: Heather Clarke (m. 1996; died 2006) Alison Campbell (m. 2012)
- Children: 2

Career
- Sport: Golf
- College: Wake Forest University
- Turned professional: 1990
- Current tours: PGA Tour Champions; European Senior Tour
- Former tours: PGA Tour; European Tour
- Professional wins: 29
- Highest ranking: 8 (22 July 2001)

Number of wins by tour
- PGA Tour: 3
- European Tour: 14
- Japan Golf Tour: 3
- Asian Tour: 1
- Sunshine Tour: 1
- Challenge Tour: 1
- PGA Tour Champions: 6
- European Senior Tour: 1
- Other: 4

Best results in major championships (wins: 1)
- Masters Tournament: T8: 1998
- PGA Championship: T9: 2000
- U.S. Open: T10: 1999
- The Open Championship: Won: 2011

Darren Christopher Clarke (born 14 August 1968) is a professional golfer from Northern Ireland who currently plays on the PGA Tour Champions. Previously he played on the European Tour and PGA Tour. He has won 21 tournaments worldwide, including on the Japan Golf Tour and Sunshine Tour. His biggest victory came when he won the 2011 Open Championship at Royal St George's in England, his first major win after more than 20 years and 54 attempts.

Clarke has also won two World Golf Championship events, most notably the 2000 WGC-Andersen Consulting Match Play Championship, when he defeated Tiger Woods in the final. Clarke was ranked in the top-10 of the Official World Golf Ranking for 43 weeks between 2000 and 2002. His highest finish on the European Tour money list is second, which he achieved in 1998, 2000 and 2003. Clarke is currently ranked as the seventh-highest career money winner on the European Tour.

Clarke has represented Ireland as both an amateur and as a professional, notably at the World Cup and Alfred Dunhill Cup, and was a member of five consecutive European Ryder Cup teams between 1997 and 2006.

== Amateur career ==
Clarke was born in Dungannon, County Tyrone, Northern Ireland, and in 1987 he played collegiate golf at Wake Forest University in the United States. He was a junior member of Dungannon Golf Club, whose junior section also included three others who are current PGA Golf Professionals: Alistair Cardwell, Barry Hamill and Gary Chambers. Clarke represented his school, Royal School Dungannon, together with Cardwell and Chambers.

== Professional career ==
=== 1990–92: Early career ===
Clarke turned professional in 1990 and he played his first full season on the European Tour in 1991. He contested in his first major championship at the 1991 Open Championship, making the cut before finishing in a tie for 64th place. In 1992 Clarke had a solid season on the European Tour, finishing 41st in overall Order of Merit, in doing so achieving the highest finish of his career at the time with a second-place finish at the Honda Open. He finished three strokes behind champion Bernhard Langer.

=== 1993–95: First European Tour win and steady progress ===
Clarke's real breakthrough year was in 1993 when he won his maiden European Tour event and played his way to 8th position on the Order of Merit. After a relatively solid but unspectacular first half of the season, Clarke's form improved greatly during the August–September stretch, achieving four top-10 finishes in four consecutive tournaments.

In October 1993, Clarke won his maiden European Tour event at the Alfred Dunhill Open in Belgium. Clarke had the lead after 54 holes and held off the challenge of Englishman Nick Faldo and Vijay Singh, who shot a final-round 64. Clarke prevailed by two strokes. A month later Clarke nearly won his second title at the European Tour's season-ending Volvo Masters, however, he was pipped to the title by Colin Montgomerie who finished one stroke clear. Overall for the season Clarke made 24 out of 30 cuts and finished in the top-10 on seven occasions.

The follow-up year in 1994 was another solid season for Clarke on the tour, making 17 of 21 cuts and finishing 37th on the Order of Merit list. Clarke also played in his first U.S. Open although he missed the cut and had his highest finish, at the time, in The Open Championship with a tie for 38th place. In 1995, Clarke had better success, with seven top-10s in 27 events, most notably at the Portuguese Open where he finished second after losing a sudden-death playoff to Adam Hunter on the first extra hole, despite having the joint 54-hole lead. Clarke ended the year 14th on the Order of Merit.

=== 1996–1999: Four more European Tour wins and near miss at 1997 Open ===
In 1996, Clarke won his second European Tour title at the Linde German Masters by one stroke, shooting a final round 63 to finish 24 under par, one stroke ahead of Englishman Mike Davis. Clarke also recorded his best finish in a major, at that time, with a tie for 11th place at The Open Championship in 1996. He also equalled his best finish on the Order of Merit, placing in 8th for the season.

In May 1997, Clarke finished second at the Volvo PGA Championship, two strokes behind Ian Woosnam. In July 1997, Clarke was in a position to win his first major championship at the 1997 Open Championship at Royal Troon. Clarke held the lead with American Jim Furyk after the first round and then pulled two strokes clear of the field after a 66 in the second round, but a third-round 71 put him two strokes behind leader Jesper Parnevik going into the final day. However, the winner was not to come from the final pairing, as Justin Leonard came storming through the pack with a 65 to beat both Clarke and Parnevik by three strokes. Clarke ended the season 4th on the Order of Merit.

In 1998, Clarke made his first appearances at two of the biggest golf events worldwide. He missed the cut on his debut at The Players Championship, but his first visit to Augusta National Golf Club was much more successful, shooting 67–69 on the weekend to finish in a tie for 8th at the Masters Tournament. This remains his highest-ever finish at the Masters to date.

In May 1998, Clarke won his third career event on the European Tour at the Benson & Hedges International Open by three strokes from Santiago Luna. Clarke then had three more 2nd-place finishes during the season before winning the season-ending Volvo Masters in Spain. His two victories in 1998 helped him to finish in 2nd place on the final 1998 Order of Merit standings behind Colin Montgomerie. Clarke missed only one cut all year, at the Murphy's Irish Open. In 1999, Clarke captured his fifth European Tour win at the Compass Group English Open, finishing two strokes ahead of John Bickerton. He also achieved his highest-ever placing at the U.S. Open this year when he finished tied for 10th place.

=== 2000: WGC-Matchplay Championship win and further success ===
Clarke's worldwide breakthrough came in 2000 when he won his first World Golf Championship event, defeating Tiger Woods in the final 4&3 at the 2000 WGC-Andersen Consulting Match Play Championship at La Costa Resort and Spa. This was Clarke's biggest victory of his career so far as he netted the $1 million first prize. Clarke had a difficult route through the championship but defeated a host of big-name players: Paul Azinger, Mark O'Meara, Thomas Bjørn, Hal Sutton and David Duval before taking on Woods in the final.

Clarke's fine year in 2000 continued when he finished tied for second place in the Volvo PGA Championship and the following week he won his seventh European Tour event at the Compass Group English Open. Clarke also recorded his best finish at the PGA Championship with a tie for 9th place. He also had three 2nd-place finishes in the 2000 season, which included eleven top-10 finishes. He finished 2nd on the Order of Merit and it was his highest-ever season in terms of prize money. Clarke earned over €2.7 million for the year.

=== 2001–03: Continued success and second WGC win ===
The 2001 season saw Clarke finish one place lower on the Order of Merit in 3rd place, although he did manage some notable results on tour during this season. Clarke added to his list of European Tour wins at the Smurfit European Open, which he won by three strokes at The K Club. A couple of weeks later, Clarke produced another fine performance at The Open Championship at Royal Lytham & St Annes, finishing in a tie for 3rd place, four strokes behind the eventual winner David Duval. Clarke then had another notable 3rd-place finish at the WGC-NEC Invitational, earning in excess of €400,000.

In 2002, Clarke played on both the European Tour and the PGA Tour. In the buildup to the Masters, Clarke played the Shell Houston Open and finished second behind runaway winner Vijay Singh. He then played on the European Tour in the summer and won his ninth career title at the Compass Group English Open, becoming the first man to win the tournament three times.

In the 2003 WGC-Accenture Match Play Championship, Clarke lost to Peter Lonard at the quarter-final stage. However, Clarke did not have to wait much longer for more WGC success though, when he won his second WGC event at the WGC-NEC Invitational at Firestone Country Club in Akron, Ohio. He finished four strokes ahead of Jonathan Kaye. Clarke's run of success throughout 2001–2003 saw him miss only three cuts on the European Tour in three years and he finished 2nd on the European Order of Merit for the third time in his career.

=== 2004: First winless season in seven years ===
Clarke continued his run of good form at the WGC-Accenture Match Play Championship in 2004, when he finished third. He lost to Davis Love III in the semi-final on the 21st hole, but beat Stephen Leaney 2-up in the resulting 3rd place playoff match. Clarke also had a good finish at the WGC-American Express Championship, finishing in a tie for 4th place. Despite winning over $2 million in prize money, Clarke did not win an event during the 2004 season on either tour and this was the first time this had happened since 1997.

=== 2005–2007: Loss of form and slump ===
Clarke played the 2005 season half and half between the European Tour and the PGA Tour. He enjoyed a solid season with many top-10 finishes, but he could not climb the final hurdle of winning an event. The highlights of his year were a 2nd-place finish at the Barclays Scottish Open in Europe and another 2nd place at the MCI Heritage in the United States. With Clarke playing much fewer tournaments on the European Tour he only finished 20th on the Order of Merit compared to his previous success in this category.

In 2006, Clarke only managed to record four top-10 placings and finished the year 43rd on the Order of Merit. However, just six weeks after the death of his wife, Heather, he made a big contribution to Europe's Ryder Cup win in 2006 at the K Club in Ireland. Clarke was one of Ian Woosnam's two wild card picks and he earned three points on the way to victory for Europe, including a 3 & 2 win in his singles match against Zach Johnson. The 2007 season was the worst of Clarke's professional career. He did not record any top-10 finishes. He withdrew from a number of events in the year and finished 143rd on the Order of Merit list.

=== 2008: Return to form ===
Clarke ended his winless streak in April 2008 when he won the BMW Asian Open in an emotional victory after a birdie on the 72nd hole to see off Robert-Jan Derksen by one stroke. This was Clarke's first win in almost five years and the 11th of his career. The win broke the shackles from the slump in form he went through in the previous years and his 12th victory was not far around the corner. Clarke won again in the Netherlands at the KLM Open finishing the tournament four shots ahead of Paul McGinley. Clarke ended his comeback year 13th in the Order of Merit Standings, however, he missed out on a place in Nick Faldo's Ryder Cup team, the first time Clarke had done so in over 10 years.

=== 2009–10: Consistent play ===
The 2009 and 2010 seasons were steady in progress for Clarke as he began to rebuild his form following the successful 2008 season. He only managed to record three top-10 finishes during the whole of 2009, most notably tying for 5th place in the defence of his KLM Open title in the Netherlands. Clarke finished 61st in the Race to Dubai Standings and missed out a place in the season-ending finale narrowly by finishing outside the top 60. In 2010, however, he did make it into the Dubai Finals after finishing 30th at the end of the year. He was aided by two second-place finishes throughout the season at the Joburg Open behind winner Charl Schwartzel and then at the Barclays Scottish Open ending up three strokes behind Edoardo Molinari.

=== 2011: Open Championship victory ===
In 2011, Clarke won his first European Tour title since August 2008 with a three-stroke victory over Chris Wood and David Lynn in the Iberdrola Open. After finishing tied for third in the 2001 Open Championship, Clarke did not make the top-10 of any major, until he won his first major championship at the 2011 Open at the age of 42 – his 20th attempt at winning the Claret Jug.

Clarke dedicated his victory to his two children and late wife Heather, who died of breast cancer in 2006: "In terms of what's going through my heart, there's obviously somebody who is watching from up above there, and I know she'd be very proud of me. But I think she'd be more proud of my two boys and them at home watching more than anything else. It's been a long journey to get here."

With Clarke's triumph in The Open at Royal St George's, it was the first time since 1910 that one country (other than the United States) had different golfers win consecutive majors. Rory McIlroy, also of Northern Ireland, captured the 2011 U.S. Open title one month earlier at Congressional Country Club in Bethesda, Maryland. Clarke's victory at the 2011 Open meant that he became the third major winner from Northern Ireland in 13 months, following Graeme McDowell's win in the 2010 U.S. Open and Rory McIlroy's victory in the 2011 U.S. Open, prompting McIlroy to quip that Northern Ireland was the 'Golf Capital of the World'.

=== PGA Tour Champions ===
In November 2020, Clarke won the TimberTech Championship in Boca Raton, Florida for his first win on the PGA Tour Champions. It was his first worldwide since he won The Open Championship in 2011. Clarke collected his second win at the Mitsubishi Electric Championship at Hualalai in Hawaii just 3 months later. In September 2021, Clarke won the Sanford International in a playoff over K. J. Choi and Steve Flesch.

In July 2022, Clarke won his first senior major championship at The Senior Open Championship, played at Gleneagles in Scotland. He won by one shot over Pádraig Harrington. He also became the fourth player in history to win both The Open Championship and The Senior Open Championship.

== Ryder Cup and other team golf ==
Clarke has represented Ireland as both an amateur and as a professional, most notably at the World Cup and Alfred Dunhill Cup. He was a member of five consecutive European Ryder Cup teams in 1997, 1999, 2002, 2004 and 2006, winning on four occasions and was also appointed a non-playing vice-captain by Colin Montgomerie in 2010 and by Paul McGinley in 2014.

Clarke's most notable appearance at the Ryder Cup was in 2006, six weeks after the death of his wife Heather. Heather had loved the Ryder Cup and encouraged Darren to compete in it, so he made himself available for selection. European captain Ian Woosnam chose Clarke as one of his two wild cards, and he contributed three points from three matches to Europe's victory and was embraced by members of the European and U.S. teams after he finished the tournament.

Clarke was named as the 2016 Ryder Cup captain on 18 February 2015. He was selected by a five-man selection panel consisting of the last three Ryder Cup captains: Paul McGinley, José María Olazábal, Colin Montgomerie, another ex-Ryder Cup player David Howell and the European Tour chief executive George O'Grady.

== Personal life ==
Clarke's grandfather Ben played football for Portadown, Sheffield United, Exeter City and Carlisle United and earned two amateur caps for the Ireland national football team (1882–1950) in 1934. His father Godfrey played for Glenavon.

He met his wife Heather in a nightclub in Portrush, County Antrim, and they married in March 1996. The couple had two sons, and the family lived at Sunningdale, Berkshire, UK. In 2005 and 2006 he missed several tournaments to care for his wife, who had been diagnosed with both primary breast cancer in December 2001, then, in 2004, with secondary breast cancer. Heather Clarke died on 13 August 2006 at 39 years of age, in the Royal Marsden Hospital, London.

Clarke's friend Paul McGinley immediately announced his own withdrawal from the PGA Championship starting in Medinah, Illinois. In a statement, McGinley said, "Our two families are very much intertwined, obviously me and Darren, but Heather and (McGinley's wife) Ali were the best of friends and our kids are in the same class at school. So it is a tough time for us all".

Following Clarke's performance at the 2006 Ryder Cup, six weeks after his wife had died, he was the favourite to win the 2006 BBC Sports Personality of the Year award, but was runner-up to Zara Phillips. He had previously stated he did not want to win with a sympathy vote after his wife's death.

Clarke and his sons moved back to Northern Ireland, making their home in Portrush. Clarke and former Miss Northern Ireland Alison Campbell married on 11 April 2012.

On 6 April 2011, Clarke was photographed by Kevin Abosch for The Face of Ireland project.

Clarke is a supporter of Liverpool F.C.

Clarke was appointed Officer of the Order of the British Empire (OBE) in the 2012 New Year Honours for services to golf.

== Amateur wins ==
- 1989 East of Ireland Championship
- 1990 Spanish International Amateur Championship, Irish Amateur Close Championship, South of Ireland Championship, North of Ireland Amateur Championship

== Professional wins (29) ==
=== PGA Tour wins (3) ===
Legend
Major championships (1)
World Golf Championships (2)
Other PGA Tour (0)

No.	Date	Tournament	Winning score	Margin of victory	Runner(s)-up
1	27 Feb 2000	WGC-Andersen Consulting Match Play Championship	4 and 3		(United States) Tiger Woods
2	24 Aug 2003	WGC-NEC Invitational	−12 (65-70-66-67=268)	4 strokes	(United States) Jonathan Kaye
3	17 Jul 2011	The Open Championship	−5 (68-68-69-70=275)	3 strokes	(United States) Dustin Johnson, (United States) Phil Mickelson

=== European Tour wins (14) ===
Legend
Major championships (1)
World Golf Championships (2)
Tour Championships (1)
Other European Tour (10)

No.	Date	Tournament	Winning score	Margin of victory	Runner(s)-up
1	10 Oct 1993	Alfred Dunhill Open	−14 (68-68-66-68=270)	2 strokes	(England) Nick Faldo, (Fiji) Vijay Singh
2	6 Oct 1996	Linde German Masters	−24 (70-64-67-63=264)	1 stroke	(England) Mark Davis
3	17 May 1998	Benson & Hedges International Open	−15 (70-69-67-67=273)	3 strokes	(Spain) Santiago Luna
4	1 Nov 1998	Volvo Masters	−17 (67-73-68-63=271)	2 strokes	(Scotland) Andrew Coltart
5	6 Jun 1999	Compass Group English Open	−20 (68-65-67-68=268)	2 strokes	(England) John Bickerton
6	27 Feb 2000	WGC-Andersen Consulting Match Play Championship	4 and 3		(United States) Tiger Woods
7	4 Jun 2000	Compass Group English Open (2)	−13 (70-72-68-65=275)	1 stroke	(New Zealand) Michael Campbell, (England) Mark James
8	8 Jul 2001	Smurfit European Open	−15 (68-68-71-66=273)	3 strokes	(Denmark) Thomas Bjørn, (Republic of Ireland) Pádraig Harrington, (Wales) Ian Woosnam
9	9 Jun 2002	Compass Group English Open (3)	−17 (65-70-68-68=271)	3 strokes	(Denmark) Søren Hansen
10	24 Aug 2003	WGC-NEC Invitational	−12 (65-70-66-67=268)	4 strokes	(United States) Jonathan Kaye
11	27 Apr 2008	BMW Asian Open^{1}	−8 (71-69-67-73=280)	1 stroke	(Netherlands) Robert-Jan Derksen
12	24 Aug 2008	KLM Open	−16 (68-64-66-66=264)	4 strokes	(Republic of Ireland) Paul McGinley
13	15 May 2011	Iberdrola Open	−6 (65-70-70-69=274)	3 strokes	(England) David Lynn, (England) Chris Wood
14	17 Jul 2011	The Open Championship	−5 (68-68-69-70=275)	3 strokes	(United States) Dustin Johnson, (United States) Phil Mickelson

^{1}Co-sanctioned by the Asian Tour

European Tour playoff record (0–1)

No.	Year	Tournament	Opponent	Result
1	1995	Portuguese Open	(Scotland) Adam Hunter	Lost to birdie on first extra hole

=== Japan Golf Tour wins (3) ===
No.	Date	Tournament	Winning score	Margin of victory	Runner(s)-up
1	29 Apr 2001	The Crowns	−13 (66-67-67-67=267)	4 strokes	(Japan) Keiichiro Fukabori, (Japan) Shinichi Yokota
2	14 Nov 2004	Mitsui Sumitomo Visa Taiheiyo Masters	−22 (66-65-67-68=266)	6 strokes	(Japan) Nozomi Kawahara, (England) Lee Westwood
3	13 Nov 2005	Mitsui Sumitomo Visa Taiheiyo Masters (2)	−18 (66-71-65-68=270)	2 strokes	(Japan) Mitsuhiro Tateyama

Japan Golf Tour playoff record (0–1)

No.	Year	Tournament	Opponents	Result
1	1999	Sumitomo Visa Taiheiyo Masters	(Japan) Ryoken Kawagishi, (Japan) Hirofumi Miyase	Miyase won with par on second extra hole Kawagishi eliminated by par on first hole

=== Sunshine Tour wins (1) ===
No.	Date	Tournament	Winning score	Margin of victory	Runners-up
1	4 Feb 2001	Dimension Data Pro-Am	−14 (71-63-69-71=274)	2 strokes	(South Africa) Retief Goosen, (South Africa) Tjaart van der Walt

Sunshine Tour playoff record (0–1)

No.	Year	Tournament	Opponent	Result
1	1999	Vodacom Players Championship	(South Africa) Nic Henning	Lost to birdie on second extra hole

=== Challenge Tour wins (1) ===
No.	Date	Tournament	Winning score	Margin of victory	Runner-up
1	14 Sep 2003	Benmore Developments Northern Ireland Masters	−11 (72-66-65-70=273)	2 strokes	(England) Stuart Little

=== Other wins (4) ===
No.	Date	Tournament	Winning score	Margin of victory	Runner(s)-up
1	1992	Ulster Professional Championship			
2	22 May 1994	Smurfit Irish PGA Championship	285	3 strokes	(Northern Ireland) Raymond Burns
3	5 Jul 2010	J. P. McManus Pro-Am	−3 (73-68=141)	1 stroke	(England) Luke Donald
4	21 Jul 2010	Lough Erne Challenge (with (Northern Ireland) Rory McIlroy)	−6 (66)	1 stroke	(Republic of Ireland) Pádraig Harrington and (Republic of Ireland) Shane Lowry

Other playoff record (0–1)

No.	Year	Tournament	Opponents	Result
1	2005	Nedbank Golf Challenge	(United States) Jim Furyk, (South Africa) Retief Goosen, (Australia) Adam Scott	Furyk won with birdie on second extra hole Goosen eliminated by par on first hole

=== PGA Tour Champions wins (6) ===
Legend
Senior major championships (1)
Other PGA Tour Champions (5)

No.	Date	Tournament	Winning score	Margin of victory	Runner(s)-up
1	1 Nov 2020	TimberTech Championship	−17 (69-62-68=199)	1 stroke	(United States) Jim Furyk, (Germany) Bernhard Langer
2	23 Jan 2021	Mitsubishi Electric Championship at Hualalai	−21 (63-68-64=195)	2 strokes	(South Africa) Retief Goosen
3	19 Sep 2021	Sanford International	−12 (63-70-65=198)	Playoff	(South Korea) K. J. Choi, (United States) Steve Flesch
4	24 Jul 2022	The Senior Open Championship	−10 (65-67-69-69=270)	1 stroke	(Republic of Ireland) Pádraig Harrington
5	8 Jun 2025	American Family Insurance Championship (with (Denmark) Thomas Bjørn)	−32 (59-58-64=181)	4 strokes	(United States) Doug Barron and (United States) Dicky Pride, (Germany) Alex Čejka and (Denmark) Søren Kjeldsen, (United States) Steve Flesch and (United States) Paul Goydos, (United States) Steve Stricker and (United States) Mario Tiziani
6	7 Jun 2026	American Family Insurance Championship (2) (with (United States) Ben Crane)	−30 (62-54-67=183)	1 stroke	(United States) George McNeill and (United States) Kenny Perry

PGA Tour Champions playoff record (1–0)

No.	Year	Tournament	Opponents	Result
1	2021	Sanford International	(South Korea) K. J. Choi, (United States) Steve Flesch	Won with birdie on second extra hole Flesch eliminated by par on first hole

=== European Senior Tour wins (1) ===
Legend
Senior major championships (1)
Other European Senior Tour (0)

No.	Date	Tournament	Winning score	Margin of victory	Runner-up
1	24 Jul 2022	The Senior Open Championship	−10 (65-67-69-69=270)	1 stroke	(Republic of Ireland) Pádraig Harrington

== Major championships ==
=== Wins (1) ===
Year	Championship	54 holes	Winning score	Margin	Runners-up
2011	The Open Championship	1 shot lead	−5 (68-68-69-70=275)	3 strokes	(United States) Dustin Johnson, (United States) Phil Mickelson

=== Results timeline ===
Results not in chronological order in 2020.

! Tournament	1991	1992	1993	1994	1995	1996	1997	1998	1999
Masters Tournament								T8	CUT
U.S. Open				CUT		CUT	T43	T43	T10
The Open Championship	T64	CUT	T39	T38	T31	T11	T2	CUT	T30
PGA Championship							CUT		CUT

! Tournament	2000	2001	2002	2003	2004	2005	2006	2007	2008	2009
Masters Tournament	T40	24	T20	T28	CUT	T17	T22	CUT		
U.S. Open	T53	T30	T24	T42	CUT		56			CUT
The Open Championship	T7	T3	T37	T59	T11	T15	CUT	CUT		T52
PGA Championship	T9	CUT	CUT	CUT	T13	CUT		T42	CUT	CUT

Tournament	2010	2011	2012	2013	2014	2015	2016	2017	2018
Masters Tournament			CUT		T44	T52	CUT		
U.S. Open				CUT	CUT	CUT			
The Open Championship	T44	1	CUT	T21	T26	CUT	T30	CUT	CUT
PGA Championship	T48	CUT	T54	75	CUT	CUT	CUT		

Tournament	2019	2020	2021	2022	2023	2024	2025	2026
Masters Tournament								
PGA Championship								
U.S. Open								
The Open Championship	CUT	NT	CUT	CUT	CUT	T75	CUT	CUT

Win
Top 10
Did not play

CUT = missed the halfway cut
"T" indicates a tie for a place
NT = no tournament due to COVID-19 pandemic

=== Summary ===
Tournament	Wins	2nd	3rd	Top-5	Top-10	Top-25	Events	Cuts made
Masters Tournament	0	0	0	0	1	5	14	9
PGA Championship	0	0	0	0	1	2	18	6
U.S. Open	0	0	0	0	1	2	15	8
The Open Championship	1	1	1	3	4	8	34	20
Totals	1	1	1	3	7	17	81	43

- Most consecutive cuts made – 7 (2000 Masters – 2001 Open Championship)
- Longest streak of top-10s – 2 (2000 Open Championship – 2000 PGA)

== Results in The Players Championship ==
Tournament	1998	1999
The Players Championship	CUT	T71

Tournament	2000	2001	2002	2003	2004	2005	2006	2007	2008	2009
The Players Championship	CUT	T26	CUT	T6	T26	T63	T20	WD		

Tournament	2010	2011	2012	2013	2014	2015
The Players Championship					CUT	WD

Top 10
Did not play

CUT = missed the halfway cut
WD = withdrew
"T" indicates a tie for a place

== World Golf Championships ==
=== Wins (2) ===
Year	Championship	54 holes	Winning score	Margin	Runner-up
2000	WGC-Andersen Consulting Match Play Championship	n/a	4 and 3		(United States) Tiger Woods
2003	WGC-NEC Invitational	1 shot lead	–12 (65-70-66-67=268)	4 strokes	(United States) Jonathan Kaye

=== Results timeline ===
Tournament	1999	2000	2001	2002	2003	2004	2005	2006	2007	2008	2009	2010	2011	2012
Match Play	R64	1		R64	QF	3	R64	R64	R64					R64
Championship	T40	T17	NT^{1}	63	T38	T4		T26			T46			T43
Invitational	T36	T17	3	T19	1	T14	T28	WD	T67	T6	T22		T68	
Champions													T38	

^{1}Cancelled due to 9/11

Win
Top 10
Did not play

QF, R16, R32, R64 = Round in which player lost in match play
"T" = Tied
WD = Withdrew
NT = No tournament
Note that the HSBC Champions did not become a WGC event until 2009.

== Senior major championships ==
=== Wins (1) ===
Year	Championship	54 holes	Winning score	Margin	Runner-up
2022	The Senior Open Championship	1 shot lead	−10 (65-67-69-69=270)	1 stroke	(Republic of Ireland) Pádraig Harrington

=== Results timeline ===
Results not in chronological order

Tournament	2019	2020	2021	2022	2023	2024	2025	2026
Senior PGA Championship	T35	NT	54	T14	T5	T21	T11	CUT
The Tradition	T27	NT	T8	T13	T9	T32	T42	T54
U.S. Senior Open	CUT	NT	T28	CUT	T32	T42	T18	T8
Senior Players Championship		T23	T12	T38	T30	T33	T21	10
The Senior Open Championship	T10	NT	3	1	T33	T13	T51	CUT

Win
Top 10
Did not play

"T" indicates a tie for a place
CUT = missed the halfway cut
NT = no tournament due to COVID-19 pandemic

== Team appearances ==
Amateur

- European Amateur Team Championship (representing Ireland): 1989
- St Andrews Trophy (representing Great Britain & Ireland): 1990 (winners)

Professional

- Alfred Dunhill Cup (representing Ireland): 1994, 1995, 1996, 1997, 1998, 1999
- World Cup (representing Ireland): 1994, 1995, 1996
- Ryder Cup (representing Europe): 1997 (winners), 1999, 2002 (winners), 2004 (winners), 2006 (winners), 2016 (non-playing captain)
  - Record: 20 matches, 11.5 points (58% Point Percentage)
  - All Formats (W-L-H): 10–7–3 = 11.5 pts
    - Singles: 1–2–2 = 2 pts
    - Foursomes: 3–3–0 = 3 pts
    - Fourballs: 6–2–1 = 6.5 pts
- Seve Trophy (representing Great Britain & Ireland): 2000, 2002 (winners), 2011 (winners)
- Royal Trophy (representing Europe): 2007 (winners)
- EurAsia Cup (representing Europe): 2016 (non-playing captain, winners)

== Awards and honours ==
- 1993 Texaco Ireland Sportstar Golf Award
- 1997 Texaco Ireland Sportstar Golf Award
- 1998 Texaco Ireland Sportstar Golf Award
- 2000 Texaco Ireland Sportstar Golf Award
- 2003 Texaco Ireland Sportstar Golf Award
- 2004 Texaco Ireland Sportstar Golf Award (shared with Pádraig Harrington and Paul McGinley)

== See also ==
- List of golfers with most European Tour wins
- List of people on the postage stamps of Ireland
