= Eric Corbett =

Clergyman (1917-2002)

- Born: Charles Eric Corbett; 6 October 1917; Minera, Denbighshire, Wales
- Died: 6 April 2002 (aged 84); Helsby, Cheshire, England
- Occupations: Clergyman; Archdeacon of Liverpool 1970–1979

Charles Eric Corbett (6 October 1917 – 6 April 2002) was a clergyman in the Church of England, who was Archdeacon of Liverpool from 1970 to 1979.

== Biography ==
Corbett was born in Minera, near Wrexham, Denbighshire in North Wales. He was educated at Grove Park School in Wrexham. He studied at Jesus College, Oxford, graduating with a BA in 1939, and then studied theology at Wycliffe Hall, Oxford. He was ordained as a deacon in 1940 and as a priest in 1941 in St Asaph, and served as a curate in Gresford near Wrexham from 1940 to 1944. He was a Chaplain in the British Army on an emergency commission from 1944 to 1947, and served as a curate again, in Llanrhos near Conwy, from 1947 to 1949.

He married Sylvia Elizabeth Mary (née Howe) in Llandudno in 1949, and became rector of Christchurch, Harpurhey in 1950. He was vicar of St Catharine's church in Scholes near Wigan from 1954 to 1961, and then vicar of Farnworth near Manchester until 1971, also serving as rural dean from 1964.

Corbett succeeded Hubert Wilkinson as Archdeacon of Liverpool in 1970; and in turn was succeeded by Graeme Spiers in 1979. He was then Canon Treasurer of Liverpool Cathedral until 1983.

He died at Helsby, Cheshire.
