= 2022 Senior Open Championship =

Tournament information
- Dates: 21–24 July 2022
- Location: Auchterarder, Perthshire, Scotland, United Kingdom; 56°17′09″N 3°44′51″W
- Course: Gleneagles, Kings Course
- Organised by: The R&A
- Tours: European Senior Tour; PGA Tour Champions
- Format: 72 holes stroke play

Statistics
- Par: 70
- Length: 6,859 yards (6,272 m)
- Field: 144 players
- Prize fund: US$2,500,000
- Winner's share: US$392,800 €424,191

Champion
- (Northern Ireland) Darren Clarke
- 270 (−10)
- Location in Europe Location in the British Isles Location in Scotland

The 2022 Senior Open Championship, for sponsorship reasons known as The Senior Open Championship presented by Rolex, was a senior major golf championship and the 35th Senior Open Championship, held on 21–24 July at Gleneagles – Kings Course in Auchterarder, Perthshire, Scotland. It was the first Senior Open Championship played at the course and the 19th Senior Open Championship played as a senior major championship.

== Venue ==
The Gleneagles Hotel opened in 1924 and is located one hour outside of Edinburgh and set in grounds of 850 acres (340 ha; 1.33 sq mi). Gleneagles has three golf courses: the King's Course, Queen's Course and PGA Centenary Course, previously known as the Monarch's Course. There is also a nine-hole course called the PGA National Academy Course. The championship course, the Kings Course, was originally designed by James Braid and opened in 1919.

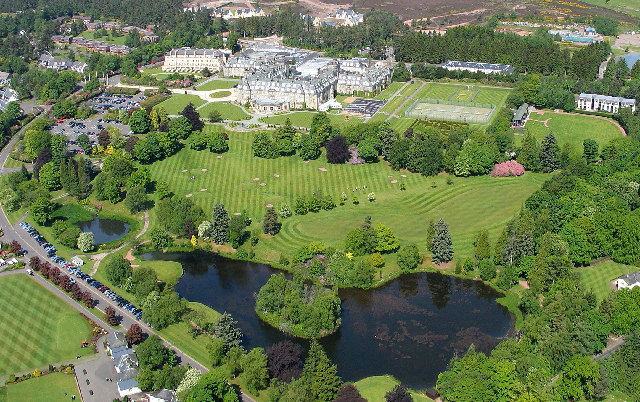
Gleneagles Hotel and grounds.

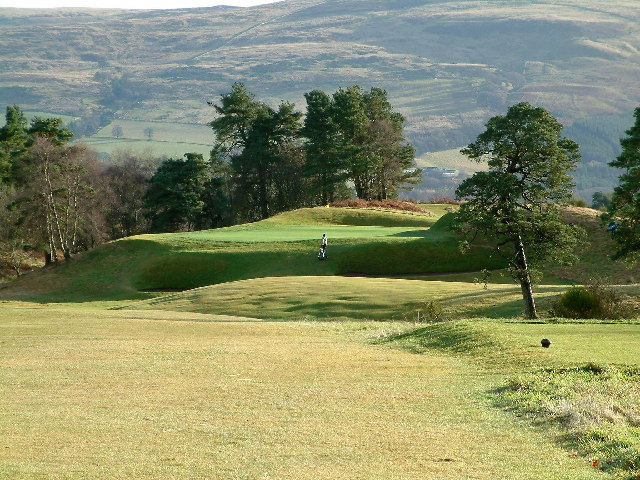
9th hole on Kings Course at Gleneagles

=== Course layout ===
Hole	Yards	Par	Hole	Yards	Par
1	362	4	10	499	5
2	436	4	11	230	3
3	368	4	12	475	4
4	443	4	13	464	4
5	178	3	14	341	4
6	462	4	15	459	4
7	468	4	16	155	3
8	178	3	17	377	4
9	409	4	18	555	5
Out	3,304	34	In	3,555	36
Source:		Total		6,859	70

== Field ==
The field of 144 competitors included 135 professionals and nine amateurs.

Four qualifying events took place on Monday July 18, for players who were not already exempt, at three venues in Scotland; Ladybank Golf Club, Fife, and Glenbervie Golf Club, Falkirk, each hosting a qualifying event while Blairgowrie Golf Club in Perth hosted an event on each of its two courses; the Rosemount and the Lansdowne.

51 players, including former PGA Tour winners Carlos Franco, David Frost and Len Mattiace, advanced from the qualifying competitions and joined the 93 exempt players for the championship.

71 players, including 69 professionals and two amateurs, made the 36-hole cut.

=== Past winners of The Senior Open Championship in the field ===
The field included four former winners of The Senior Open Championship, 2016 champion Paul Broadhurst (tied 3rd), 2010, 2014, 2017 and 2019 champion Bernhard Langer (tied 12th), 2018 champion Miguel Ángel Jiménez (tied 29th) and 2021 champion Stephen Dodd (tied 47th).

=== Past winners at The Open Championship in the field ===
The field included six former winners of The Open Championship. Four of them made the 36 hole cut; 1999 Open champion Paul Lawrie (tied 10th), 2002 and 2012 Open champion Ernie Els (tied 3rd), 2007 and 2008 Open champion Pádraig Harrington (2nd) and 2011 Open champion Darren Clarke (won). 1985 Open champion Sandy Lyle and 2001 Open champion David Duval did not make the cut.

== Final results ==
Sunday, 24 July 2022

53-year-old Darren Clarke birdied the par-5 final hole to win by a stroke and became the fourth man to win both The Open Championship and The Senior Open Championship, joining Gary Player, Bob Charles and Tom Watson. When the last group of Clarke and Paul Broadhurst had five holes to go at 6 p.m., play was suspended due to heavy rain and resumed at 8 p.m.

Place	Player	Score	To par	Money (€)
1	(Northern Ireland) Darren Clarke	65-67-69-69=270	−10	424,191
2	(Republic of Ireland) Pádraig Harrington	66-69-69-67=271	−9	282,938
T3	(New Zealand) Steven Alker	68-68-66-70=272	−8	103,816
T3	(United States) Doug Barron	69-71-67-65=272	−8	103,816
T3	(England) Paul Broadhurst	65-70-66-71=272	−8	103,816
T3	(South Africa) Ernie Els	66-69-69-68=272	−8	103,816
T3	(Thailand) Thongchai Jaidee	66-71-67-68=272	−8	103,816
T3	(Argentina) Mauricio Molina	68-69-70-65=272	−8	103,816
9	(Scotland) Colin Montgomerie	70-66-68-69=273	−7	57,020
T10	(Scotland) Paul Lawrie	69-70-69-67=275	−5	48,866
T10	(South Korea) Yang Yong-eun	73-65-68-69=275	−5	48,866

== Notes and references ==
Preceded by 2022 Bridgestone Senior Players Championship	Senior Major Championships	Succeeded by 2023 Regions Tradition
