= Kirkby High School =

Location
- Bracknell Avenue; Kirkby, Merseyside, L32 9PP; England
- Coordinates: 53.47284°N 2.891795°W

Information
- Type: Academy
- Department for Education URN: 140001 Tables
- Ofsted: Reports
- Headteacher: Anna Dobson
- Gender: Coeducational
- Age: 11 to 16
- Enrolment: 1034
- Website: kirkbyhighschool.net

Kirkby High School is a Knowsley based co-educational secondary school educating pupils aged 11–16 years of age in the Kirkby area of Merseyside, England.

== History ==
Previously known as 'Brookfield High School', in 2008 the school was merged with Ruffwood School to form 'Kirkby Sports College Centre for Learning' on the site of Brookfield. The school was completely rebuilt under the Building Schools for the Future programme. In September 2013 the school converted to academy status and was renamed Kirkby High School.

Kirkby High School is in the borough of Knowsley which had been singled out by the government for the poor achievement of their students on the assessment targets the government preferred. Kirkby has served their students, who were from a largely disadvantaged, white working class community by entering them for the more vocationally targeted BTEC qualification. In 2013, the government 'reformed' the target. Only academic subjects examined in an end-of-course exam would count. In 2011, Kirkby High School achieved a respectable 41% (5 A to Cs) that wouldn't happen in 2015: 24% achieved the new government benchmark of five GCSEs with English and maths at A* to C.

The school was visited by Ofsted in June 2015 and graded as level 3, which would have been Satisfactory, but is now spoken of as Required Improvement. The results came in August 2015. After two Section 8 monitoring inspections the school had a full inspection in 2017, where it was deemed as 'inadequate' and put back in special measures.

The school was released from special measures in December 2018, when Ofsted described it as a changed school.

== Academics ==
Virtually all maintained schools and academies follow the National Curriculum, and are inspected by Ofsted on how well they succeed in delivering a 'broad and balanced curriculum'. Schools endeavour to get all students to achieve the English Baccalaureate (EBACC) qualification- this must include core subjects a modern or ancient foreign language, and either History or Geography.

In Key Stage 3, students are setted by ability in the core subjects of English, Mathematics, Modern Foreign Languages, Science, Geography, History, RE, and Physical Education. Personal Development, Art, Computing, Drama, Music, and Technology are taught in mixed ability classes.

In Key Stage 4, students continue with a core curriculum of Mathematics GCSE, English Language and literature (worth 2 GCSEs) and the Science Trilogy or Triple Award (worth up to 3 GCSEs). They also have three options chosen from History, Geography, Spanish, Food and Nutrition, Design Technology, Computer Science, Travel and Tourism, Sports Studies, Textiles, Art and Design, Music, Dance, Drama, Childcare and Religious Studies.

== Notable former pupils ==
- Peter Bradley, former Archdeacon of Warrington
- Phil Thompson LFC footballer
- Bobby Schofield Actor
