= Peter Bradley (archdeacon) =

Archdeacon of Warrington

The Venerable Peter Bradley
- Archdeacon of Warrington
- Diocese: Diocese of Liverpool
- In office: 2001–2015
- Predecessor: David Woodhouse
- Successor: see Archdeacons in the Diocese of Liverpool

Orders
- Ordination: 1980

Personal details
- Born: Peter David Douglas Bradley; 4 July 1949 (age 77)
- Education: Brookfield School, Kirkby; Lincoln Theological College

Peter David Douglas Bradley (born 4 June 1949) was the Archdeacon of Warrington from 2001 until 31 October 2015.

Bradley was educated at Brookfield School, Kirkby and Lincoln Theological College; and ordained in 1980. He was a Curate in Upholland and then served as the Vicar of Holy Spirit, Dovecot before returning to Upholland in 1994. He was a member of the General Synod of the Church of England from 1990 to 2010.
