= Deytheur Grammar School =

Grammar School in Wales

Coordinates: 52.775°N 3.157°W

Deytheur Grammar School was opened in 1896 at Llansantffraid-ym-Mechain, Wales. Notable pupils included John Fraser Drummond DFC a Battle of Britain ace and The Ven. Arthur White, the Archdeacon of Warrington from 1947 until 1958.
