= 2003 PGA Tour =

Golf tour season

2003 PGA Tour season
- Duration: January 9, 2003 – November 9, 2003
- Number of official events: 48
- Most wins: (United States) Tiger Woods (5)
- Money list: (Fiji) Vijay Singh
- PGA Tour Player of the Year: (United States) Tiger Woods
- PGA Player of the Year: (United States) Tiger Woods
- Rookie of the Year: (United States) Ben Curtis

The 2003 PGA Tour was the 88th season of the PGA Tour, the main professional golf tour in the United States. It was also the 35th season since separating from the PGA of America.

== Schedule ==
The following table lists official events during the 2003 season.

Date	Tournament	Location	Purse (US$)	Winner (Note: The number in parentheses after each winner's name is the number of PGA Tour events they had won up to and including that tournament. This information is only shown for PGA Tour members.)	OWGR points	Notes
Jan 12	Mercedes Championships	Hawaii	5,000,000	(South Africa) Ernie Els (11)	54	Winners-only event
Jan 19	Sony Open in Hawaii	Hawaii	4,500,000	(South Africa) Ernie Els (12)	58	
Jan 26	Phoenix Open	Arizona	4,000,000	(Fiji) Vijay Singh (12)	58	
Feb 2	Bob Hope Chrysler Classic	California	4,500,000	(Canada) Mike Weir (4)	52	Pro-Am
Feb 9	AT&T Pebble Beach National Pro-Am	California	5,000,000	(United States) Davis Love III (15)	48	Pro-Am
Feb 16	Buick Invitational	California	4,500,000	(United States) Tiger Woods (35)	52	
Feb 23	Nissan Open	California	4,500,000	(Canada) Mike Weir (5)	70	
Mar 2	WGC-Accenture Match Play Championship	California	6,000,000	(United States) Tiger Woods (36)	76	World Golf Championship
Mar 2	Chrysler Classic of Tucson	Arizona	3,000,000	(United States) Frank Lickliter (2)	24	Alternate event
Mar 9	Ford Championship at Doral	Florida	5,000,000	(United States) Scott Hoch (11)	56	
Mar 16	The Honda Classic	Florida	5,000,000	(United States) Justin Leonard (8)	50	
Mar 23	Bay Hill Invitational	Florida	4,500,000	(United States) Tiger Woods (37)	66	Invitational
Mar 30	The Players Championship	Florida	6,500,000	(United States) Davis Love III (16)	80	Flagship event
Apr 6	BellSouth Classic	Georgia	4,000,000	(United States) Ben Crane (1)	48	
Apr 13	Masters Tournament	Georgia	6,000,000	(Canada) Mike Weir (6)	100	Major championship
Apr 20	MCI Heritage	South Carolina	4,500,000	(United States) Davis Love III (17)	56	Invitational
Apr 27	Shell Houston Open	Texas	4,500,000	(United States) Fred Couples (15)	48	
May 4	HP Classic of New Orleans	Louisiana	5,000,000	(United States) Steve Flesch (1)	54	
May 11	Wachovia Championship	North Carolina	5,600,000	(United States) David Toms (8)	62	New tournament
May 18	EDS Byron Nelson Championship	Texas	5,600,000	(Fiji) Vijay Singh (13)	58	
May 25	Bank of America Colonial	Texas	5,000,000	(United States) Kenny Perry (5)	54	Invitational
Jun 1	Memorial Tournament	Ohio	5,000,000	(United States) Kenny Perry (6)	66	Invitational
Jun 9	FBR Capital Open	Maryland	4,500,000	(South Africa) Rory Sabbatini (2)	50	
Jun 15	U.S. Open	Illinois	6,000,000	(United States) Jim Furyk (8)	100	Major championship
Jun 22	Buick Classic	New York	5,000,000	(United States) Jonathan Kaye (1)	60	
Jun 29	FedEx St. Jude Classic	Tennessee	4,500,000	(United States) David Toms (9)	40	
Jul 6	Western Open	Illinois	4,500,000	(United States) Tiger Woods (38)	60	
Jul 13	Greater Milwaukee Open	Wisconsin	3,500,000	(United States) Kenny Perry (7)	28	
Jul 20	The Open Championship	England	£3,900,000	(United States) Ben Curtis (1)	100	Major championship
Jul 20	B.C. Open	New York	3,000,000	(United States) Craig Stadler (13)	24	Alternate event
Jul 27	Greater Hartford Open	Connecticut	4,000,000	(United States) Peter Jacobsen (7)	32	
Aug 3	Buick Open	Michigan	4,000,000	(United States) Jim Furyk (9)	50	
Aug 10	The International	Colorado	5,000,000	(United States) Davis Love III (18)	62	
Aug 17	PGA Championship	New York	6,000,000	(United States) Shaun Micheel (1)	100	Major championship
Aug 24	WGC-NEC Invitational	Ohio	6,000,000	(Northern Ireland) Darren Clarke (2)	78	World Golf Championship
Aug 24	Reno–Tahoe Open	Nevada	3,000,000	(United States) Kirk Triplett (2)	24	Alternate event
Sep 1	Deutsche Bank Championship	Massachusetts	5,000,000	(Australia) Adam Scott (1)	50	New tournament
Sep 7	Bell Canadian Open	Canada	4,200,000	(United States) Bob Tway (8)	42	
Sep 15	John Deere Classic	Illinois	3,500,000	(Fiji) Vijay Singh (14)	42	
Sep 21	84 Lumber Classic of Pennsylvania	Pennsylvania	4,000,000	(United States) J. L. Lewis (2)	32	
Sep 28	Valero Texas Open	Texas	3,500,000	(United States) Tommy Armour III (2)	44	
Oct 5	Southern Farm Bureau Classic	Mississippi	3,000,000	(United States) John Huston (7)	24	
Oct 5	WGC-American Express Championship	Georgia	6,000,000	(United States) Tiger Woods (39)	76	World Golf Championship
Oct 12	Las Vegas Invitational	Nevada	4,000,000	(Australia) Stuart Appleby (4)	52	
Oct 19	Chrysler Classic of Greensboro	North Carolina	4,500,000	(Japan) Shigeki Maruyama (3)	50	
Oct 26	Funai Classic at the Walt Disney World Resort	Florida	4,000,000	(Fiji) Vijay Singh (15)	58	
Nov 2	Chrysler Championship	Florida	4,800,000	(South Africa) Retief Goosen (3)	60	
Nov 9	The Tour Championship	Texas	6,000,000	(United States) Chad Campbell (1)	64	Tour Championship

=== Unofficial events ===
The following events were sanctioned by the PGA Tour, but did not carry official money, nor were wins official.

Date	Tournament	Location	Purse ($)	Winner(s)	Notes
Jun 24	CVS Charity Classic	Rhode Island	1,200,000	(United States) Rocco Mediate and (United States) Jeff Sluman	Team event
Nov 16	WGC-World Cup	South Carolina	4,000,000	(South Africa) Trevor Immelman and (South Africa) Rory Sabbatini	World Golf Championship; Team event
Nov 16	Franklin Templeton Shootout	Florida	2,400,000	(United States) Hank Kuehne and (United States) Jeff Sluman	Team event
Nov 23	Presidents Cup	South Africa	n/a	Tied	Team event
Nov 30	The ConAgra Foods Skins Game	California	1,000,000	(United States) Fred Couples	Limited-field event
Dec 6	PGA Grand Slam of Golf	Hawaii	1,000,000	(United States) Jim Furyk	Limited-field event
Dec 14	Target World Challenge	California	5,000,000	(United States) Davis Love III	Limited-field event

== Location of tournaments ==
Location of official tournaments of the 2003 PGA Tour in the continental United States and Canada.
Players & Majors
World Golf Championships
Regular events
Alternate events
Tour Championship
Location of official tournaments of the 2003 PGA Tour outside the continental United States and Canada.
Players & Majors
World Golf Championships
Regular events

== Money list ==
The money list was based on prize money won during the season, calculated in U.S. dollars.

Position	Player	Prize money ($)
1	(Fiji) Vijay Singh	7,573,907
2	(United States) Tiger Woods	6,673,413
3	(United States) Davis Love III	6,081,896
4	(United States) Jim Furyk	5,182,865
5	(Canada) Mike Weir	4,918,910
6	(United States) Kenny Perry	4,400,122
7	(United States) Chad Campbell	3,912,064
8	(United States) David Toms	3,710,905
9	(South Africa) Ernie Els	3,371,237
10	(South Africa) Retief Goosen	3,166,373

== Awards ==
Award	Winner	Ref.
PGA Tour Player of the Year (Jack Nicklaus Trophy)	(United States) Tiger Woods	
PGA Player of the Year	(United States) Tiger Woods	
Rookie of the Year	(United States) Ben Curtis	
Scoring leader (PGA Tour – Byron Nelson Award)	(United States) Tiger Woods	
Scoring leader (PGA – Vardon Trophy)	(United States) Tiger Woods	
Comeback Player of the Year	(United States) Peter Jacobsen	

== See also ==
- 2003 Champions Tour
- 2003 Nationwide Tour
