= Cyril Twitchett =

Cyril Frederick Twitchett (1890 – 3 September 1950) was an Anglican archdeacon and an Honorary Chaplain to the King in the second quarter of the Twentieth century.

Twitchett was born in Sudbury, Suffolk. He was educated at King's College London and ordained in 1913. He served curacies at St Benet Fink, Tottenham; St Hilda's Thurnscoe and St Paul's Sheffield. From 1920 to 1924 he was clerical secretary of the Life and Liberty Movement, then a bishop's messenger at Liverpool Cathedral from 1925 to 1931 when he became a residentiary canon of the cathedral.

He was Archdeacon of Warrington from 1933 to 1934; and then Archdeacon of Liverpool until his death in Liverpool on 3 September 1950.
