= Roger Preece (priest) =

British Anglican priest (born 1964)

Roger Preece (born 25 September 1964) is a British Anglican priest who was the first Archdeacon of St Helens and Warrington from 2015 until 2019.

After graduating from Imperial College London, Preece was in banking until 2005. After a course of study at St Stephen's House, Oxford, he was ordained in 2007. He was curate at Marple then Vicar of Bowdon until his appointment as Archdeacon of St Helens and Warrington. It was announced on 11 July 2019 that Preece would become Master of the Royal Foundation of St Katharine on 30 September (by which he vacated the archdeaconry).
