= Ben Clark =

Ben or Benjamin Clark may refer to:

- Ben Clark (footballer, born 1983), English footballer
- Ben Clark (politician), American politician in North Carolina
- Ben Clark, member of comedy sketch group Pappy's
- Benjamin Preston Clark (1860–1939), American entomologist
- Benjamin S. W. Clark (1829–1912), American merchant and politician from New York
- Bob Clark (Benjamin Clark, 1939–2007), American actor, director, screenwriter and producer
- Ben Lashes (real name Ben Clark), American talent manager and former musician

== See also ==
- Ben Clarke (disambiguation)
