= 2003 WGC-NEC Invitational =

Coordinates: 41.008°N 81.508°W

Tournament information
- Dates: August 21–24, 2003
- Location: Akron, Ohio, U.S.
- Course(s): Firestone Country Club
- Tour(s): PGA Tour; European Tour

Statistics
- Par: 70
- Length: 7,283
- Field: 85 players
- Cut: None
- Prize fund: $6,000,000
- Winner's share: $1,050,000

Champion
- (Northern Ireland) Darren Clarke
- 268 (−12)

The 2003 WGC-NEC Invitational was a golf tournament that was contested from August 21–24, 2003 over the South Course at Firestone Country Club in Akron, Ohio. It was the fifth WGC-NEC Invitational tournament, and the second of four World Golf Championships events held in 2003.

Darren Clarke won the tournament to capture his first WGC-NEC Invitational and his second World Golf Championships title.

== Field ==
1. 2003 United States and International Presidents Cup teams

- United States: Chris DiMarco (3,4), Fred Funk (3,4), Jim Furyk (2,3,4,5), Jay Haas (3,4), Charles Howell III (3,4,5), Jerry Kelly (3,4), Justin Leonard (3,4), Davis Love III (2,3,4,5), Phil Mickelson (2,3,4), Kenny Perry (3,4,5), David Toms (2,3,4,5), Tiger Woods (2,3,4,5)
- International: Robert Allenby (3,4), Stuart Appleby (3,4), K. J. Choi (3,4), Tim Clark, Ernie Els (3,4,5), Retief Goosen (3,4), Stephen Leaney (3,4,5), Peter Lonard (3,4), Adam Scott (3,4), Nick Price (3,4), Vijay Singh (3,4,5), Mike Weir (3,4,5)

2. 2002 United States and European Ryder Cup teams

- United States: Paul Azinger, Mark Calcavecchia, Stewart Cink, Scott Hoch (3,4), Hal Sutton, Scott Verplank (3,4)

- David Duval did not play.

- Europe: Thomas Bjørn (3,4,5), Darren Clarke (3,4), Niclas Fasth, Pierre Fulke, Sergio García (3,4), Pádraig Harrington (3,4,5), Bernhard Langer (5), Paul McGinley, Colin Montgomerie (3,4,5), Jesper Parnevik, Phillip Price (3,4,5), Lee Westwood

3. Top 50 from the Official World Golf Ranking as of August 11

Rich Beem (4), Ángel Cabrera (4), Michael Campbell (4), Paul Casey (4,5), Fred Couples (4,5), Ben Curtis (4,5), Bob Estes (4), Nick Faldo, Brad Faxon (4), Trevor Immelman, Freddie Jacobson (4), Jonathan Kaye (5), Len Mattiace (4), Rocco Mediate (4), Chris Riley (4), John Rollins (4,5), Eduardo Romero (4), Justin Rose (4), Jeff Sluman (4)

4. Top 50 from the Official World Golf Ranking as of August 18

Chad Campbell, Alex Čejka (5), Shaun Micheel (5)

5. Tournament winners of worldwide events since the 2002 WGC-NEC Invitational with an OWGR Strength of Field Rating of 100 points or more

Stephen Allan, Bob Burns, Jonathan Byrd, Ben Crane, Robert-Jan Derksen, Steve Flesch, Dan Forsman, Ignacio Garrido, Philip Golding, Peter Jacobsen, Robert Karlsson, Craig Parry, Ian Poulter, Rory Sabbatini, Gene Sauers, Steen Tinning, Kaname Yokoo

- Phil Tataurangi did not play.

6. The winner of selected tournaments from each of the following tours

- Japan Golf Tour: Japan Golf Tour Championship (2003) – Toshimitsu Izawa
- PGA Tour of Australasia: Australian PGA Championship (2002) – tie between Peter Lonard (qualified in categories 1, 3, and 4) and Jarrod Moseley
- Sunshine Tour: The Tour Championship (2003) – Hennie Otto
- Asian Tour: Volvo Masters of Asia (2002) – Kevin Na

== Round summaries ==
=== First round ===
Place	Player	Score	To par
T1	(United States) Ben Curtis	64	−6
T1	(Spain) Sergio García	64	−6
T3	(Northern Ireland) Darren Clarke	65	−5
T3	(United States) Tiger Woods	65	−5
T5	(United States) Davis Love III	66	−4
T5	(United States) Chris Riley	66	−4
T5	(United States) David Toms	66	−4
T5	(United States) Scott Verplank	66	−4
T9	(United States) Fred Couples	67	−3
T9	(South Africa) Ernie Els	67	−3
T9	(Sweden) Niclas Fasth	67	−3
T9	(South Africa) Retief Goosen	67	−3
T9	(United States) Jeff Sluman	67	−3

=== Second round ===
Place	Player	Score	To par
T1	(United States) Chris Riley	66-67=133	−7
T1	(United States) David Toms	66-67=133	−7
T3	(United States) Fred Funk	72-62=134	−6
T3	(Fiji) Vijay Singh	69-65=134	−6
T5	(Northern Ireland) Darren Clarke	65-70=135	−5
T5	(United States) Brad Faxon	68-67=135	−5
T7	(South Africa) Retief Goosen	67-69=136	−4
T7	(United States) Davis Love III	66-70=136	−4
T9	(South Africa) Ernie Els	67-70=137	−3
T9	(United States) Dan Forsman	69-68=137	−3
T9	(United States) Peter Jacobsen	73-64=137	−3
T9	(United States) Jonathan Kaye	68-69=137	−3
T9	(United States) Hal Sutton	68-69=137	−3
T9	(United States) Tiger Woods	65-72=137	−3

=== Third round ===
Place	Player	Score	To par
1	(Northern Ireland) Darren Clarke	65-70-66=201	−9
2	(United States) Jonathan Kaye	68-69-65=202	−8
3	(United States) Chris Riley	66-67-70=203	−7
T4	(United States) Davis Love III	66-70-68=204	−6
T4	(United States) Tiger Woods	65-72-67=204	−6
T6	(United States) Brad Faxon	68-67-70=205	−5
T6	(United States) Steve Flesch	71-67-67=205	−5
T6	(South Africa) Retief Goosen	67-69-69=205	−5
T6	(United States) Hal Sutton	68-69-68=205	−5
T10	(Australia) Robert Allenby	69-69-68=206	−4
T10	(United States) Fred Funk	72-62-72=206	−4
T10	(United States) Jim Furyk	69-69-68=206	−4
T10	(Fiji) Vijay Singh	69-65-72=206	−4

=== Final round ===
Place	Player	Score	To par	Money ($)
1	(Northern Ireland) Darren Clarke	65-70-66-67=268	−12	1,050,000
2	(United States) Jonathan Kaye	68-69-65-70=272	−8	550,000
3	(United States) Davis Love III	66-70-68-69=273	−7	360,000
T4	(United States) Chris Riley	66-67-70-71=274	−6	235,000
T4	(United States) Tiger Woods	65-72-67-70=274	−6	235,000
T6	(Australia) Robert Allenby	69-69-68-69=275	−5	163,333
T6	(United States) Jim Furyk	69-69-68-69=275	−5	163,333
T6	(Fiji) Vijay Singh	69-65-72-69=275	−5	163,333
T9	(United States) Brad Faxon	68-67-70-71=276	−4	116,750
T9	(South Africa) Trevor Immelman	70-68-70-68=276	−4	116,750
