= Robert Metcalf (priest) =

English priest, author and archdeacon of Liverpool

Robert Laurence Metcalf (18 November 1935 – 26 December 2014) was an Anglican priest and author.

Metcalf was educated at Durham University. After national service with REME he was ordained in 1963. He served curacies in Bootle and Widnes; and incumbencies in Wigan and Wavertree. He was Archdeacon of Liverpool from 1994 until 2002.
