= David Woodhouse (priest) =

British priest

(Charles) David (Stewart) Woodhouse
- Archdeacon of Warrington
- Diocese: Diocese of Liverpool
- In office: 1981–2001

Personal details
- Born: 4 June 1949
- Denomination: Christianity
- Education: MA (1995)
- Alma mater: Silcoates School, Wakefield, Kelham Theological College, Lancaster University

(Charles) David (Stewart) Woodhouse (born 4 June 1949) served as the Archdeacon of Warrington in the Diocese of Liverpool from 1981 to 2001. He was educated at Silcoates School, Wakefield, Kelham Theological College, and Lancaster University (MA 1995).

After a curacy at St Wilfrid's, Halton, Leeds, he served as the Youth Chaplain in Kirkby. Following this, he had a stint in Bermuda at Pembroke Parish. Woodhouse also held the position of General Secretary of the Church of England Men's Society from 1970 to 1976. Later, he became the Rector of Ideford Common and served as the Domestic Chaplain to the Bishop of Exeter from 1976 to 1981.
