= John Lawton (priest) =

John Arthur Lawton (19 January 1913 - 29 April 1995) was the Archdeacon of Warrington from 1970 until 1981.

Lawton was educated at Rugby, Fitzwilliam College, Cambridge and Ripon College Cuddesdon; and ordained in 1938. He was a Curate at St Dunstan, Edgehill (1937–40); Vicar of St Anne Wigan (1940–56), St Luke, Southport (1956–60) and Kirkby (1960–69); and Canon Diocesan of Liverpool (1963–87).
