= Thomas Madden (priest) =

Archdeacon of Liverpool

Thomas John Madden (25 July 1853 - 26 December 1915) was Archdeacon of Liverpool from 1906 until his death.

Madden was ordained in 1879 and was a curate in Everton. He was metropolitan secretary of the Church Pastoral Aid Society from 1883 to 1885; vicar of St Mark's Barrow-in-Furness from 1885 to 1888; and vicar of St Luke's Liverpool from 1888 to 1906.

His son was killed during the First World War in March 1915. He died in December that year, aged 62.
