= Herbert Baker (cricketer) =

English cricketer (1880–1958)

Personal information
- Full name: Herbert Zouch Baker
- Born: 7 February 1880; Beckenham, Kent
- Died: 26 August 1958 (aged 78); Orpington, Kent
- Batting: Right-handed
- Relatives: Percy Baker (brother)

Domestic team information
- Years: Team
- 1903–1904: Kent

Career statistics
Competition	First-class
Matches	12
Runs scored	211
Batting average	11.72
100s/50s	0/1
Top score	82
Balls bowled	190
Wickets	5
Bowling average	21.60
5 wickets in innings	0
10 wickets in match	0
Best bowling	2/68
Catches/stumpings	6/–
- Source: CricInfo, 18 March 2017

Herbert Zouch Baker (7 February 1880 – 26 August 1958) was an English cricketer in the early years of the 20th century.

== Early life ==
Baker was born at Beckenham in Kent to Alfred John Baker, a stockbroker and to Alice Moody, one of six sons and two daughters. He was educated at Wellington College.

== Cricket ==
Baker played club cricket for Beckenham and is said to have "dominated" play at the club in the years before World War I with his "outstanding all round performances". He was described as "a stroke-playing, correct batsman and a bowler with immaculate control of length, moving the ball both ways, as well as a fine fielder".

Baker made his first-class cricket debut for Kent during the county's North American tour in September and October 1903. He played in both first-class matches during the tour against the Gentlemen of Philadelphia. Baker played nine times for Kent during the 1904 season, eight times in the 1904 County Championship and once against Marylebone Cricket Club (MCC). His final match for the county was against Somerset at Foxgrove Road in Beckenham during 1904. He made his final first-class appearance for JR Mason's XI in a match at Old Buckenham Hall Cricket Ground in 1913.

== Family and later life ==
Baker's brother Percy also played for Kent between 1900 and 1902. The brothers played together at Beckenham alongside another brother Alfred. Baker was a stockbroker's clerk by profession, in later life becoming a sports outfitter. He died at Orpington in 1958 aged 78.

== Bibliography ==
- Carlaw, Derek (2020). Kent County Cricketers, A to Z: Part One (1806–1914) (PDF). Cardiff: ACS.
