= Francis Taylor, 1st Baron Maenan =

English barrister and judge

The Right Honourable The Lord Maenan GBE KC JP DL

Railway and Canal Commissioner
- In office 1930–1951

Presiding Judge, Liverpool Court of Passage
- In office 1903–1948

Personal details
- Born: William Francis Kyffin Taylor; 9 July 1854 Liverpool, England
- Died: 22 September 1951 (aged 97)

William Francis Kyffin Taylor, 1st Baron Maenan GBE KC JP DL (9 July 1854 – 22 September 1951) was a prominent English barrister and judge. He was a Railway and Canal Commissioner from 1930 to its abolition in 1949, and was its last member.

== Background and education ==
Taylor was the son of the Venerable William Francis Taylor, Archdeacon of Liverpool. He was born in Liverpool, Lancashire, educated at Liverpool College (of which he became vice-president in 1927) and later attended Exeter College, Oxford, where he graduated as BA in 1877. He studied law at the Inner Temple and became barrister in 1879.

Two of his brothers were politicians: Brigadier-General Gerald Kyffin-Taylor, member of parliament for Kirkdale, and Austin Kyffin Taylor, member for East Toxteth.

== Legal and judicial career ==
Taylor's legal career was one of prestige, becoming a Q.C. in 1895 and holding the office of Presiding Judge of the Court of Passage between 1903 and 1948.

Other offices he held included Recorder of Bolton in 1901–03, Bencher of the Inner Temple in 1905, Justice of the Peace for Shropshire (1916), Deputy Lieutenant of Shropshire (1931), Chairman of the Quarter Sessions for Shropshire, Judge of Appeal for the Isle of Man between 1918 and 1921, Vice-President of the War Compensation Court between 1920 and 1928 and Treasurer of the Inner Temple in 1926.

He was also a Commissioner of the Ministry of Transport in 1928. He retired from the bench in April 1948, at 93 years and 9 months and only three years before his death, making him then the oldest serving judge in Great Britain.

Taylor was appointed a Knight Commander of the Order of the British Empire (KBE) in 1918 and promoted to Knight Grand Cross (GBE) in 1929. For his services to the judiciary he was raised to the peerage as Baron Maenan, of Ellesmere in the County of Shropshire, on 29 June 1948, then aged 93 and the oldest person ever to be made a peer.

== Family ==
Taylor married Mary, a daughter of Robert Crooks, in 1883.

In later life he had a country home in Shropshire at Gadlas Hall in Dudleston Heath, which he rented out to Charles de Gaulle's family during their exile in England in the Second World War.

He died in September 1951, aged 97. His title became extinct on his death, as he had no male heir. The Francis Taylor Building (built in 1957) in the Inner Temple is named in his honour.

Peerage of the United Kingdom
New creation	Baron Maenan; 1948–1951	Extinct
