= Arthur White (priest) =

British priest (1880–1961)

Arthur White (17 January 1880 - 20 August 1961) was the Archdeacon of Warrington from 1947 until 1958.

White was educated at Deytheur Grammar School, St David's College, Lampeter and Oxford University; and ordained in 1905. He held curacies in Ashton-in-Makerfield; and Headington Quarry and incumbencies in Wigan, Golborne and Billinge.
