= Reggie Spooner =

English rugby union footballer and cricketer

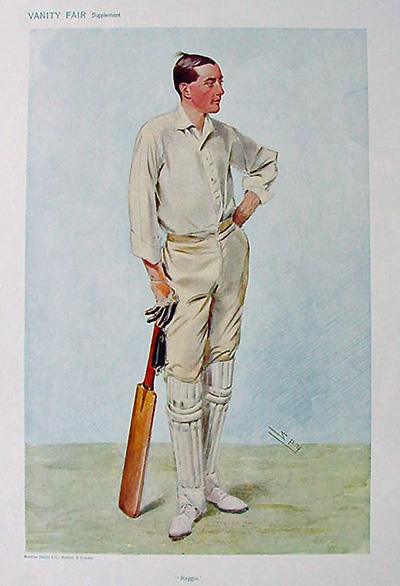
- "Reggie" as caricatured by Spy (Leslie Ward) in Vanity Fair, July 1906

Cricket information
- Batting: Right-handed

International information
- National side: England
- Test debut: 24 July 1905 v Australia
- Last Test: 19 August 1912 v Australia

Career statistics
Competition	Test	First-class
Matches	10	237
Runs scored	481	13,681
Batting average	32.06	36.28
100s/50s	1/4	31/59
Top score	119	247
Balls bowled	–	710
Wickets	–	6
Bowling average	–	97.00
5 wickets in innings	–	0
10 wickets in match	–	0
Best bowling	–	1/5
Catches/stumpings	4/–	142/–
- Source: CricInfo, 6 November 2022

Reginald Herbert Spooner (21 October 1880 – 2 October 1961) was a cricketer who played for Lancashire and England. He also played Rugby Union for England.

== Biography ==
The son of the Rev. Hardwicke Spooner, of Woolton, Spooner was educated at Marlborough College, where he played rugby for the school as well as captaining the cricket and field hockey First Elevens. He became one of the leading amateur batsmen of the so-called "Golden Age" of English cricket before the First World War. Coming to prominence as a schoolboy cricketer at Marlborough, Spooner played first class cricket for Lancashire in 1899, then disappeared on three years' military service with the Manchester Regiment, some of it in the Second Boer War in South Africa. He had been commissioned a second lieutenant in the 1st Battalion of the regiment on 19 October 1901, and resigned the commission in November 1902, after the end of the war in South Africa.

Reappearing in 1903, he scored 247 against Nottinghamshire, at that time the highest score made against that county, and shared with Archie MacLaren a first-wicket partnership of 368 against Gloucestershire at Aigburth, Liverpool, which remains the Lancashire record. For the next three years, Spooner, along with MacLaren and Johnny Tyldesley, was the backbone of a formidable batting side that played forty-five County Championship matches without defeat between August 1903 and July 1905.

Spooner's off-drive was particularly strong. He was also noted for his watchfulness and skill at fast bowling on fiery pitches – which were the rule at Old Trafford in fine weather during the 1900s. Among many notable innings by Spooner on fiery wickets were against Essex in 1904 and for the Gentlemen at Lord's against Arthur Fielder in 1906.

The season of 1907 saw Spooner go into business, and for a time it was feared he would not play at all. He did play five times for Lancashire and again beat Fielder with an innings of 134 at Canterbury, and at the Scarborough Festival against the touring South Africans when he became credited as one of the first batsmen to work out the googly, the ball bowled with a leg break action that then breaks from the off. Furthermore, in 1908, when Spooner would have been in his element on rough Old Trafford pitches from which the ball often "flew", he played only one county match on the August Bank Holiday against Yorkshire. He found time for a few matches in both 1909 and 1910 and scored 200 not out against Yorkshire on the Bank Holiday.

In 1911, Spooner was able to manage his business to permit him to play regularly until after the August Bank Holiday. He scored 2,312 runs at an average of more than 51 per innings, but announced he would not be able to tour Australia because of business. In 1912, Spooner played all six Tests, including his only Test century against South Africa. Disaster struck though the following year when an accident while hunting prevented him playing. Moreover, business demands were such that Spooner never played more than a few matches a year from 1914 onwards. Yet, so well-thought-of was he that, after the First World War, Spooner was offered, and accepted, the captaincy of the Marylebone Cricket Club (MCC) tour to Australia in 1920–21. However, he then had to turn it down because of injury. In the event, MCC led by Johnny Douglas lost the Test series 5–0 to the Australian cricket team led by Warwick Armstrong.

Spooner was a Wisden Cricketer of the Year in 1905. He was later president of Lancashire.

In rugby, Spooner was a centre three-quarter for Liverpool R.F.C. and played for England against Wales at Swansea in 1902–03.
