= Stanton Durant =

Stanton Vincent Durant (born 1942) was Archdeacon of Liverpool from 1991 until 1993.

Durant was ordained in 1973. He was at Emmanuel, Paddington, first as Curate then as Vicar from 1976 to 1987. He then served further incumbencies at Hackney Marsh and Stoneycroft before his appointment as Archdeacon.
