= 2000 WGC-Andersen Consulting Match Play Championship =

Coordinates: 33°05′32.16″N 117°16′01.33″W

Tournament information
- Dates: February 23–27, 2000
- Location: Carlsbad, California
- Course: La Costa Resort and Spa
- Tours: PGA Tour; European Tour

Statistics
- Par: 72
- Length: 7,022
- Field: 64 players
- Prize fund: $5,000,000
- Winner's share: $1,000,000

Champion
- (Northern Ireland) Darren Clarke
- def. Tiger Woods 4 & 3

The 2000 WGC-Andersen Consulting Match Play Championship was a golf tournament that was played from February 23–27, 2000 at La Costa Resort and Spa in Carlsbad, California. It was the second WGC-Andersen Consulting Match Play Championship and the first of four World Golf Championships events held in 2000.

Darren Clarke won his first World Golf Championships event at the match-play, by defeating Tiger Woods 4 & 3 in the 36 hole final.

== Brackets ==
The Championship was a single elimination match play event. The field consisted of the top 64 players available from the Official World Golf Ranking as of the February 13 ranking, seeded according to those rankings.

For the second successive year Jumbo Osaki (ranked #36) chose not to play. He was replaced by Michael Campbell (#65).

=== Bobby Jones bracket ===
First round February 23
1	(United States) Tiger Woods	5&4
16	(New Zealand) Michael Campbell
8	(South Africa) Retief Goosen	3&2
9	(United States) Stewart Cink
5	(United States) John Huston
12	(Japan) Shigeki Maruyama	1up
4	(United States) Justin Leonard	6&5
13	(United States) Fred Funk
6	(United States) Chris Perry
11	(Scotland) Paul Lawrie	1up
3	(United States) Phil Mickelson
14	(United States) Billy Mayfair	20h
7	(Spain) José M. Olazábal	1up
10	(Australia) Craig Parry
2	(Zimbabwe) Nick Price
15	(United States) Mark Calcavecchia	2&1

Second round February 24
1	(United States) Tiger Woods	1up
8	(South Africa) Retief Goosen
12	(Japan) Shigeki Maruyama	1up
4	(United States) Justin Leonard
11	(Scotland) Paul Lawrie	3&2
14	(United States) Billy Mayfair
7	(Spain) José M. Olazábal
15	(United States) Mark Calcavecchia	4&3

Third round February 25
1	(United States) Tiger Woods	4&3
12	(Japan) Shigeki Maruyama
11	(Scotland) Paul Lawrie	21h
15	(United States) Mark Calcavecchia

Fourth round February 26
1	(United States) Tiger Woods	1up
11	(Scotland) Paul Lawrie

=== Ben Hogan bracket ===
First round February 23
1	(United States) Davis Love III	2&1
16	(United States) Olin Browne
8	(Australia) Steve Elkington
9	(United States) Jeff Sluman	2&1
5	(United States) Jeff Maggert
12	(United States) Bob Tway	6&5
4	(United States) Jim Furyk	2&1
13	(United States) Rocco Mediate
6	(Spain) Miguel Á. Jiménez	19h
11	(United States) Brent Geiberger
3	(United States) Tom Lehman	6&4
14	(United States) Andrew Magee
7	(United States) Bob Estes	20h
10	(United States) Steve Pate
2	(South Africa) Ernie Els	2&1
15	(Germany) Bernhard Langer

Second round February 24
1	(United States) Davis Love III	3&2
9	(United States) Jeff Sluman
12	(United States) Bob Tway
4	(United States) Jim Furyk	2&1
6	(Spain) Miguel Á. Jiménez	4&3
3	(United States) Tom Lehman
7	(United States) Bob Estes	1up
2	(South Africa) Ernie Els

Third round February 25
1	(United States) Davis Love III	3&2
4	(United States) Jim Furyk
6	(Spain) Miguel Á. Jiménez	2&1
7	(United States) Bob Estes

Fourth round February 26
1	(United States) Davis Love III	3&2
6	(Spain) Miguel Á. Jiménez

=== Gary Player bracket ===
First round February 23
1	(United States) David Duval	4&3
16	(Argentina) Ángel Cabrera
8	(United States) Tim Herron	2&1
9	(United States) Dudley Hart
5	(Paraguay) Carlos Franco
12	(Canada) Mike Weir	4&3
4	(Spain) Sergio García	20h
13	(United States) Loren Roberts
6	(United States) Fred Couples
11	(Japan) Joe Ozaki	1up
3	(Sweden) Jesper Parnevik	2&1
14	(Republic of Ireland) Pádraig Harrington
7	(Australia) Stuart Appleby
10	(United States) Scott Hoch	1up
2	(England) Lee Westwood	2&1
15	(United States) Brandt Jobe

Second round February 24
1	(United States) David Duval	2&1
8	(United States) Tim Herron
12	(Canada) Mike Weir
4	(Spain) Sergio García	7&6
11	(Japan) Joe Ozaki
3	(Sweden) Jesper Parnevik	19h
10	(United States) Scott Hoch	1up
2	(England) Lee Westwood

Third round February 25
1	(United States) David Duval	2&1
4	(Spain) Sergio García
3	(Sweden) Jesper Parnevik
10	(United States) Scott Hoch	2&1

Fourth round February 26
1	(United States) David Duval	5&4
10	(United States) Scott Hoch

=== Sam Snead bracket ===
First round February 23
1	(Scotland) Colin Montgomerie	2&1
16	(United States) Dennis Paulson
8	(United States) Glen Day
9	(Denmark) Thomas Bjørn	1up
5	(Northern Ireland) Darren Clarke	2&1
12	(United States) Paul Azinger
4	(United States) Mark O'Meara	1up
13	(Australia) Greg Norman
6	(United States) David Toms	1up
11	(United States) Brian Watts
3	(United States) Hal Sutton	4&3
14	(United States) Ted Tryba
7	(United States) Steve Stricker	2&1
10	(United States) Lee Janzen
2	(Fiji) Vijay Singh
15	(United States) Duffy Waldorf	2&1

Second round February 24
1	(Scotland) Colin Montgomerie
9	(Denmark) Thomas Bjørn	23h
5	(Northern Ireland) Darren Clarke	5&4
4	(United States) Mark O'Meara
6	(United States) David Toms
3	(United States) Hal Sutton	1up
7	(United States) Steve Stricker
15	(United States) Duffy Waldorf	2&1

Third round February 25
9	(Denmark) Thomas Bjørn
5	(Northern Ireland) Darren Clarke	1up
3	(United States) Hal Sutton	2&1
15	(United States) Duffy Waldorf

Fourth round February 26
5	(Northern Ireland) Darren Clarke	1up
3	(United States) Hal Sutton

=== Final Four ===
Semi-finals; February 26
1	(United States) Tiger Woods	5&4
1	(United States) Davis Love III
1	(United States) David Duval
5	(Northern Ireland) Darren Clarke	4&2

Finals; February 27
1	(United States) Tiger Woods
5	(Northern Ireland) Darren Clarke	4&3
Third place
1	(United States) Davis Love III
1	(United States) David Duval	5&4

== Prize money breakdown ==
Place	US ($)
Champion	1,000,000
Runner-up	500,000
Third place	400,000
Fourth place	300,000
Losing quarter-finalists x 4	150,000
Losing third round x 8	75,000
Losing second round x 16	50,000
Losing first round x 32	25,000
Total	$5,000,000
