= Alison Campbell =

1982 Miss Northern Ireland and modelling agency operator

Alison Campbell (née Smyth) is the franchise owner for the Miss Northern Ireland pageant and founder of ACA Models agency in Belfast.

She won the 1982 Miss Northern Ireland pageant and was the runner-up in the Miss United Kingdom 1982 pageant.

She is married to the professional golfer Darren Clarke.

== Early life ==
Campbell was born in Strabane, Co. Tyrone. She grew up in an agricultural community, and her brothers were competitive showjumpers. Campbell decided to forgo university after her A-levels to start a new role at Ulster Bank in Belfast.

After winning Miss Northern Ireland in 1982, she was transferred to the Public Relations division at Ulster Bank in which she was the face of various promotional campaigns, and gained commercial experience in marketing and management

== Professional career ==
Alongside her work at Ulster Bank, Campbell had started to manage the Miss Northern Ireland pageants from 1987. Campbell set up Alison Campbell Models in 1990 shortly after taking a severance package from Ulster Bank.

Her modelling clients have included Mary Gormley who came 3rd in the 2005 Miss Universe pageant, Zöe Salmon from Blue Peter and Orlaith McAllister from Big Brother.

=== Personal life ===
She married Arthur Campbell in 1984, with whom she had two boys. They separated in 2004. In 2009, she met golfer Darren Clarke through a mutual connection, Graeme McDowell. Campbell and Clarke were married in Bermuda in 2012.
