= Pete Spiers =

Archdeacon of Knowsley and Sefton since 2015

The Venerable Pete Spiers
- Archdeacon of Knowsley and Sefton
- Church: Church of England
- Diocese: Diocese of Liverpool
- In office: 2015 to present

Orders
- Ordination: 1986 (deacon); 1987 (priest)

Personal details
- Born: Peter Hendry Spiers; 13 August 1961 (age 65)
- Denomination: Anglicanism
- Education: St John's College, Durham; Ridley Hall, Cambridge

Peter Hendry Spiers (born 13 August 1961) is a British Anglican priest. Since 2015, he has been Archdeacon of Knowsley and Sefton in the Diocese of Liverpool.

== Early life and education ==
Spiers was born on 13 August 1961 in Liverpool, England. He was educated at Liverpool College, then an independent school. He studied at Durham University, graduating with a Bachelor of Arts (BA) degree in 1982. While studying at Durham, he was elected Senior Man of St John's College in 1982. From 1983 to 1986, he trained for ordination at Ridley Hall, Cambridge, an evangelical theological college. During this time, he completed a Certificate of Theology (CertTh).

== Ordained ministry ==
Spiers was ordained in the Church of England as a deacon in 1986 and as a priest in 1987. Following a curacy at St Luke, West Derby, he was Team Vicar of Everton from 1990 to 1995, and Vicar of St Georges Everton from 1995 to 2005. He was at St Luke, Crosby from 2005 to 2015; and Area Dean of Sefton, 2008 to 2015. In 2006, he was made an honorary canon of Liverpool Cathedral. In 2015, he was appointed Archdeacon of Knowsley and Sefton; a newly created post in the Diocese of Liverpool. He was collated as archdeacon in November 2015 during a service at Liverpool Cathedral.

Spiers is an evangelical Anglican. He welcomes the Church of England's introduction of blessings for same-sex partnerships.

Since 2000, he has been an elected member of the General Synod of the Church of England. He also served on the Crown Nominations Commission between 2007 and 2012.

== Personal life ==
Spiers was born with phocomelia as a consequence of the drug thalidomide, although he does not think of himself as disabled.

He is married to Annie and they have four children.
