= Eric Evans (priest, born 1902) =

Eric Herbert Evans (31 January 1902 – 25 December 1977) was the Archdeacon of Warrington from 1959 to 1970.

== Life ==
Evans was educated at Liverpool Institute and Bishop Wilson Theological College, Isle of Man. He was ordained in 1930. After curacies in Liverpool and Southport, he was Chaplain at the Liverpool branch of the Mission to Seamen. He was vicar of Crossens, and then, during World War II, a Chaplain in the Royal Navy Reserve. He was vicar of Southport from 1946 to 1948; and then of Meols until his retirement.
