= Hardwicke Spooner =

Anglican priest and author (1851–1933)

George Hardwicke Spooner (10 December 1851 – 7 February 1933) was an Anglican priest and author in the first half of the Twentieth century.

Spooner was educated at the King's School, Worcester and Pembroke College, Oxford and ordained in 1874. After a curacy at All Saints, Liverpool he was Superintendent of the Liverpool Church of England Scripture Readers Society from 1876 to 1879. He held incumbencies at Litherland, Much Woolton and Walton-on-the-Hill; and was Rural Dean of Childwall from 1885 to 1906; Archdeacon of Warrington from 1906 to 1916; and Archdeacon of Liverpool from 1916 until his death aged 82.

Amongst other books he wrote The Ethics of Sunday School Work, 1886; Inspiration, 1891; A Word with You, 1894; Intercessory Services, 1899; and Hymns for the South African War, 1902. His son Reggie Spooner was a noted cricketer.
