= William Lefroy =

Irish Anglican Dean, mountaineer and author

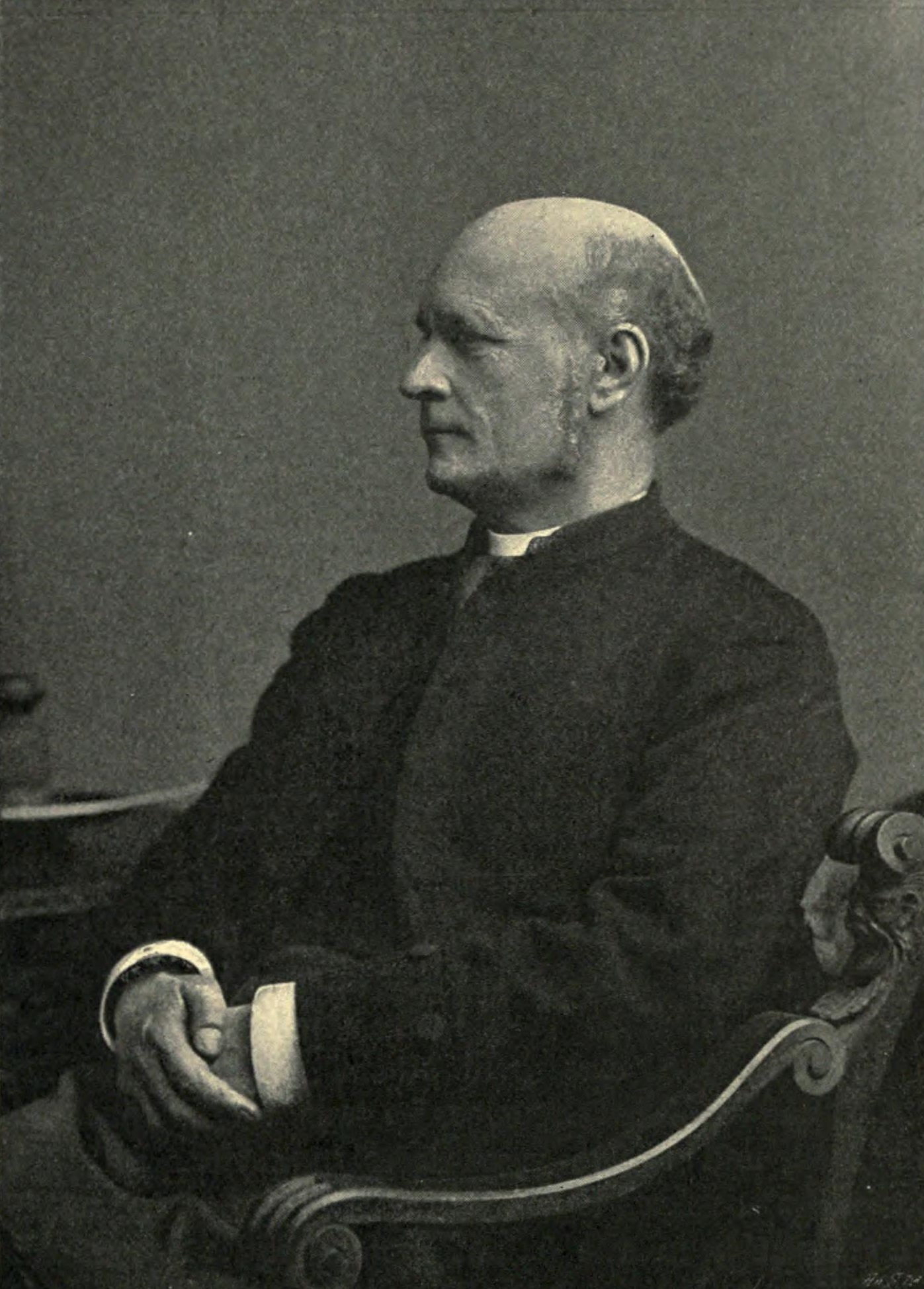
William Lefroy, by William Lefroy.

William Lefroy (1836–1909) was an Anglican Dean, mountaineer and author.

== Biography ==
Born in Dublin in 1836, he was eldest of the four children of Isaac and Isabella Lefroy. William Lefroy was educated at its Trinity College and ordained in 1864. Following a curacy at Christ Church, Cork he was Vicar of St Andrew's, Liverpool, Rural Dean of Liverpool (South) and later Archdeacon of Warrington.

Lefroy was devoted to Switzerland, and he was one of the summer chaplains of the Intercontinental Church Society annually from 1867 to the year of his death. From 1875 to 1878 he was a member of the Alpine Club, but although fond of mountain climbing made no great expeditions. He helped to build the English churches at Zermatt, Riffelalp, Gletsch, and Adelboden. Lefroy was twice married. By his second wife, Mary Ann, daughter of Charles MacIver, of Calderstone, Liverpool, whom he married at Malta on 11 February 1878, he left two daughters. One of them was the wife of Sir Percy Bates, fourth baronet.

In 1889 he became Dean of Norwich, a post he held until his death on 11 August 1909.

Leroy was active in English Freemasonry, being initiated in 1899 in the Union Lodge No 52, Norwich. He served as Provincial Grand Chaplain of Norfolk, and in 1904 was appointed Grand Chaplain of the United Grand Lodge of England.

== Sources ==
This article incorporates text from a publication now in the public domain: Pearce, Ernest Harold (1912). "Lefroy, William". In Lee, Sidney (ed.). Dictionary of National Biography (2nd supplement). Vol. II. London: Smith, Elder & Co.
