= Ricky Panter =

British Anglican priest

Richard John Graham "Ricky" Panter (born 18 September 1948) is a British Anglican priest. He was Archdeacon of Liverpool from 2002 until 2017.

Panter was educated at Monkton Combe School, Worcester College of Education and Oak Hill Theological College. After three years as a teacher, he was ordained in 1977. After a curacy at Holy Trinity, Rusholme he was Assistant Vicar at St Cyprian with Christchurch, Edge Hill. He was Vicar of St Andrews, Clubmoor from 1985 to 1996; and then of St John and St James, Bootle until 2011.
