= 2011 Open Championship =

Coordinates: 51.274°N 1.367°E

Tournament information
- Dates: 14–17 July 2011
- Location: Sandwich, England
- Course: Royal St George's Golf Club
- Organized by: The R&A
- Tours: European Tour; PGA Tour; Japan Golf Tour

Statistics
- Par: 70
- Length: 7,211 yards (6,594 m)
- Field: 156 players, 71 after cut
- Cut: 143 (+3)
- Prize fund: £5,000,000 €5,553,000 $8,067,100
- Winner's share: £900,000 €999,540 $1,452,078

Champion
- (Northern Ireland) Darren Clarke
- 275 (−5)

Location in England
Location in Kent. England

The 2011 Open Championship was a men's major golf championship and the 140th Open Championship, held from 14 to 17 July at Royal St George's Golf Club in Sandwich, Kent, England. Darren Clarke won his first and to date only major championship, three strokes ahead of runners-up Dustin Johnson and Phil Mickelson.

== Venue ==
This was the fourteenth Open Championship at Royal St George's; the last was in 2003 when Ben Curtis won his only major championship and finished as the only player under par at −1, a stroke clear of Vijay Singh and Thomas Bjørn.

The course was lengthened by 105 yards (96 m) and par returned to 70, having been 71 in 2003 when the fourth hole was a par five.

=== Course layout ===
Hole	Yards	Par	Hole	Yards	Par
1	444	4	10	415	4
2	417	4	11	243	3
3	240	3	12	381	4
4	495	4^	13	459	4
5	419	4	14	547	5
6	178	3	15	496	4
7	564	5	16	163	3
8	453	4	17	426	4
9	412	4	18	459	4
Out	3,622	35	In	3,589	35
Source:		Total		7,211	70

^ Hole No. 4 was a par 5 in 2003

Lengths of the course for previous Opens (since 1950):

- 2003: 7,106 yards (6,498 m), par 71
- 1993: 6,860 yards (6,273 m), par 70
- 1985: 6,857 yards (6,270 m), par 70
- 1981: 6,827 yards (6,243 m), par 70

== Field ==
Each year, around two-thirds of The Open Championship field consists of players that are fully exempt from qualifying for the Open. The players who have already qualified for the 2011 Open Championship are listed below. Each player is classified according to the first category in which he qualified, but other categories are shown in parentheses.

1. Past Open Champions aged 60 or under on 17 July 2011
Mark Calcavecchia, Stewart Cink (2,4,20), Ben Curtis (2,4), John Daly, David Duval (2), Ernie Els (2,4,6,7,16), Todd Hamilton (2), Pádraig Harrington (2,4,6,7,14,20), Paul Lawrie, Tom Lehman, Justin Leonard (4), Sandy Lyle, Mark O'Meara, Louis Oosthuizen (2,4,5,6,7)

- Eligible but not competing: Ian Baker-Finch, Nick Faldo, Greg Norman (4), Nick Price, Bill Rogers
- Tiger Woods (2,4,6,12,14,20) withdrew with a knee injury

2. The Open Champions for 2001–2010

3. Past Open Champions born between 17 July 1945 and 19 July 1948
(This exemption category was introduced in 2008 when the age limit for past Open Champions was reduced from 65 to 60. It enabled those past Champions aged 60 to 65 at that time to continue playing until they were 65. Johnny Miller is now the only player in this category. He has not played in the Open since 1991.)

4. Past Open Champions finishing in the top 10 and tying for 10th place in The Open Championship 2006–2010
Tom Watson

5. First 10 and anyone tying for 10th place in the 2010 Open Championship
Paul Casey (6,7,8,16), Retief Goosen (6,7,16), Martin Kaymer (6,7,14,20), Rory McIlroy (6,7,12,20), Sean O'Hair, Robert Rock, Henrik Stenson (15), Nick Watney (6,16), Lee Westwood (6,7,20)

6. The first 50 players on the Official World Golf Rankings for Week 22, 2011
Robert Allenby (16), Jonathan Byrd, K. J. Choi (15,16), Ben Crane (16), Jason Day (16), Luke Donald (7,8,16,20), Rickie Fowler (20), Jim Furyk (16,20), Bill Haas, Anders Hansen (7), Peter Hanson (7,20), Miguel Ángel Jiménez (7,20), Dustin Johnson (16,20), Zach Johnson (13,16,20), Robert Karlsson (7), Kim Kyung-tae (24), Matt Kuchar (16,20), Martin Laird (16), Hunter Mahan (16,20), Matteo Manassero, Graeme McDowell (7,12,20), Phil Mickelson (13,16,20), Francesco Molinari (7,20), Edoardo Molinari (7,20), Ryan Moore (16), Geoff Ogilvy (16,22), Ryan Palmer (16), Ian Poulter (7,20), Álvaro Quirós (7), Justin Rose (16), Rory Sabbatini, Charl Schwartzel (7,13,23), Adam Scott (16), Brandt Snedeker, Steve Stricker (16,20), Bo Van Pelt (16), Bubba Watson (16,20), Yang Yong-eun (14)

- Tim Clark (15,16) withdrew with an elbow injury
- David Toms withdrew with a hip injury

7. First 30 in the European Tour Final Race to Dubai for 2010
Fredrik Andersson Hed, Darren Clarke, Rhys Davies, Ross Fisher (20), Stephen Gallacher, Richard Green, Grégory Havret, Thongchai Jaidee, Simon Khan (8), Joost Luiten, Danny Willett

8. The BMW PGA Championship winners for 2009–2011

9. First 3 and anyone tying for 3rd place, not exempt having applied above, in the top 20 of the 2011 European Tour Race to Dubai on completion of the 2011 BMW PGA Championship
Thomas Aiken, Raphaël Jacquelin

- Nicolas Colsaerts withdrew with an elbow injury

10. First 2 European Tour members and any European Tour members tying for 2nd place, not exempt, in a cumulative money list taken from all official European Tour events from the 2011 BMW PGA Championship up to and including the BMW International Open and including the U.S. Open
Sergio García, Pablo Larrazábal

11. The leading player, not exempt having applied above, in the first 5 and ties of each of the 2011 Alstom Open de France and the 2011 Barclays Scottish Open
Thorbjørn Olesen, Scott Jamieson

12. The U.S. Open Champions for 2007–2011
Ángel Cabrera (13), Lucas Glover

13. The U.S. Masters Champions for 2007–2011
Trevor Immelman

14. The U.S. PGA Champions for 2006–2010

15. The U.S. PGA Tour Players Champions for 2009–2011

16. Top 30 on the Official 2010 PGA Tour FedEx Cup points list
Charley Hoffman, Kevin Na, Jeff Overton (20), Kevin Streelman, Camilo Villegas

17. First 3 and anyone tying for 3rd place, not exempt having applied No. 6, in the top 20 of the FedEx Cup points list of the 2011 PGA Tour on completion of the Crowne Plaza Invitational at Colonial
Aaron Baddeley, Mark Wilson, Gary Woodland

18. First 2 PGA Tour members and any PGA Tour members tying for 2nd place, not exempt, in a cumulative money list taken from The Players Championship and the five PGA Tour events leading up to and including the 2011 AT&T National
Harrison Frazar, Freddie Jacobson

19. The leading player, not exempt having applied above, in the first 5 and ties of each of the 2011 AT&T National and the 2011 John Deere Classic
Charles Howell III, Kyle Stanley

20. Playing members of the 2010 Ryder Cup teams

21. First place on the 2010 Asian Tour Order of Merit
Noh Seung-yul

22. First place on the 2010 PGA Tour of Australasia Order of Merit

23. First place on the 2010 Sunshine Tour Order of Merit

24. The 2010 Japan Open Champion

25. First 2, not exempt, on the Official Money List of the Japan Golf Tour for 2010
Hiroyuki Fujita, Ryo Ishikawa

26. The leading 4 players, not exempt, in the 2011 Mizuno Open
Bae Sang-moon, Hwang Jung-gon, Brad Kennedy, Prayad Marksaeng

27. First 2 and anyone tying for 2nd place, not exempt having applied (26) above, in a cumulative money list taken from all official 2011 Japan Golf Tour events up to and including the 2011 Mizuno Open
Hiroo Kawai, Tadahiro Takayama

28. The Senior British Open Champion for 2010
Bernhard Langer

29. The 2011 Amateur Champion
Bryden Macpherson (a)

30. The 2010 U.S. Amateur Champion
Peter Uihlein (a)

31. The 2010 European Individual Amateur Champion
Lucas Bjerregaard (a)

International Final Qualifying

Australasia: Kurt Barnes, Rick Kulacz, Matthew Millar
Africa: Floris de Vries, Martin Maritz, Neil Schietekat
Asia: Tetsuji Hiratsuka, Jason Knutzon, Lam Chih Bing, Prom Meesawat
America: Chad Campbell, Brian Davis, Bob Estes, Nathan Green, Jerry Kelly, Spencer Levin, Davis Love III, Chris Tidland
Europe: Grégory Bourdy, Gary Boyd, Alejandro Cañizares, George Coetzee, Kenneth Ferrie, Richard McEvoy, Alex Norén, Graeme Storm, Peter Whiteford

- Thomas Levet (Europe) withdrew with a leg injury

Local Final Qualifying

Littlestone: Markus Brier, Lee Corfield, Andy Smith
Prince's: Simon Edwards, Francis McGuirk, Tom Shadbolt
Royal Cinque Ports: Craig Hinton (a), Andrew Johnston, Simon Lilly
Rye: Mark Laskey, Tom Lewis (a), Adam Wootton

- (a) denotes amateur

Alternates
To make up the full entry of 156, additional players are drawn from the Official World Golf Rankings dated 3 July 2011 (provided the player was entered in the Open and did not withdraw from qualifying).

1. Webb Simpson (ranked 54) – As of 4 July 2011, a maximum of 151 players could qualify so the leading five players in the rankings not already qualified were offered places
2. J. B. Holmes (59)
3. Vijay Singh (63) – subsequently withdrew with an injury.
4. Steve Marino (64)
5. Yuta Ikeda (67)
6. Jason Dufner (69) replaced Tiger Woods (Brendan Jones (68) declined the invitation)
7. Robert Garrigus (70) replaced Thomas Levet
8. Anthony Kim (72) replaced Tim Clark
9. Simon Dyson (73) replaced David Toms
10. Thomas Bjørn (75) replaced Vijay Singh
11. Ricky Barnes (81) replaced Nicolas Colsaerts (Scott Verplank (76) declined the invitation)

== Round summaries ==
=== First round ===
Thursday, 14 July 2011

Returning to the course where he led by three with four holes to play in 2003, Thomas Bjørn (who gained entry into the tournament as the fifth alternate) shot 65 (−5) in the morning to set the early pace. Surprisingly, 20-year-old amateur Tom Lewis, a later starter, tied Bjørn's score to share the lead. Lewis was the first amateur to hold at least a share of the lead after 18 holes since Michael Bonallack in 1968. He also carded the lowest single-round score by an amateur at The Open Championship. 47-year-old Miguel Ángel Jiménez, 2009 U.S. Open champion Lucas Glover, and Webb Simpson all shot 66, a stroke back. Pre-tournament favourite Rory McIlroy, the reigning U.S. Open champion, bogeyed his first hole and shot 71; world number one Luke Donald and number two Lee Westwood matched that score. Defending champion Louis Oosthuizen struggled in the calmer afternoon conditions, managing only a 72. Dustin Johnson earned shot of the day honors late in the morning when he aced the par-3 16th hole, part of a five-under-par four hole stretch from 14 through 17; he finished at 70. The large group at 68, three off the leaders, included 2010 U.S. Open champion Graeme McDowell, and reigning PGA Championship champion Martin Kaymer.

Place	Player	Score	To par
T1	(Denmark) Thomas Bjørn	65	−5
T1	(England) Tom Lewis (a)	65	−5
T3	(United States) Lucas Glover	66	−4
T3	(Spain) Miguel Ángel Jiménez	66	−4
T3	(United States) Webb Simpson	66	−4
T6	(Sweden) Fredrik Andersson Hed	68	−2
T6	(Australia) Kurt Barnes	68	−2
T6	(United States) Ricky Barnes	68	−2
T6	(Northern Ireland) Darren Clarke	68	−2
T6	(England) Simon Dyson	68	−2
T6	(South Korea) Hwang Jung-gon	68	−2
T6	(Germany) Martin Kaymer	68	−2
T6	(Spain) Pablo Larrazábal	68	−2
T6	(Northern Ireland) Graeme McDowell	68	−2
T6	(United States) Jeff Overton	68	−2
T6	(United States) Ryan Palmer	68	−2
T6	(United States) Kyle Stanley	68	−2

=== Second round ===
Friday, 15 July 2011

In the morning's play, overnight co-leader Tom Lewis shot 74 to fade back into the chasing pack. The clubhouse lead was taken by Lucas Glover, who started the day one stroke back and posted a steady level-par 70 to stay at −4. He was soon matched by veteran Darren Clarke who reached the mark with a rare closing birdie. As the wind picked up in the afternoon, first round co-leader Thomas Bjørn struggled to an up-and-down 72 to finish at −3. At various times, Miguel Ángel Jiménez and Simon Dyson took the lead, but struggled on their back nines; Jiménez finished at −3 and Dyson at E. Joining Bjørn and Jiménez one shot back were Chad Campbell and Martin Kaymer.

Tom Watson, playing with Tom Lewis, earned the second ace of the tournament, by holing out on the 6th hole for a hole in one. The 61-year-old Watson finished with a 70 to comfortably make the cut; he became the oldest ever player to make an Open cut. Pre-tournament favourite Rory McIlroy played better on Friday shooting 69 for an even par 140, earning a third straight round alongside Rickie Fowler. Notables who missed the cut included World No. 1 Luke Donald, World No.2 Lee Westwood, Graeme McDowell, Matt Kuchar, Nick Watney, and Pádraig Harrington.

Place	Player	Score	To par
T1	(Northern Ireland) Darren Clarke	68-68=136	−4
T1	(United States) Lucas Glover	66-70=136	−4
T3	(Denmark) Thomas Bjørn	65-72=137	−3
T3	(United States) Chad Campbell	69-68=137	−3
T3	(Spain) Miguel Ángel Jiménez	66-71=137	−3
T3	(Germany) Martin Kaymer	68-69=137	−3
T7	(South Africa) George Coetzee	69-69=138	−2
T7	(Denmark) Anders Hansen	69-69=138	−2
T7	(United States) Dustin Johnson	70-68=138	−2
T7	(Spain) Pablo Larrazábal	68-70=138	−2
T7	(United States) Tom Lehman	71-67=138	−2
T7	(United States) Davis Love III	70-68=138	−2
T7	(South Africa) Charl Schwartzel	71-67=138	−2

Amateurs: Lewis (−1), Uihlein (+2), Macpherson (+4), Bjerregaard (+8), Hinton (+29).

=== Third round ===
Saturday, 16 July 2011

In wet and windy difficult morning conditions, some of the best play came from Tom Watson, using his 35 years of Open experience to survive the worst of the weather and move up the field with a +2 (72). Rickie Fowler shot a two-under 68, still battling much of the worst of the weather, to move into contention at −2. Co-leader Darren Clarke, in the final pairing, shot 69 to take the 54-hole lead at 205 (−5), a stroke behind was Dustin Johnson. Johnson was in the final Sunday pairing for the third time in six majors, after the U.S. Open and PGA Championship the previous year. Second round co-leader Lucas Glover shot 73 to fall back to 209 (−1). Four-time major winner Phil Mickelson had 71 for even par 210, while Thomas Bjørn, repeating his strong showing at the 2003 Open on this course, shot 71 for 208 (−2).

Place	Player	Score	To par
1	(Northern Ireland) Darren Clarke	68-68-69=205	−5
2	(United States) Dustin Johnson	70-68-68=206	−4
T3	(United States) Rickie Fowler	70-70-68=208	−2
T3	(Denmark) Thomas Bjørn	65-72-71=208	−2
T5	(Spain) Miguel Ángel Jiménez	66-71-72=209	−1
T5	(United States) Lucas Glover	66-70-73=209	−1
T7	(United States) Anthony Kim	72-68-70=210	E
T7	(United States) Phil Mickelson	70-69-71=210	E
T7	(Denmark) Anders Hansen	69-69-72=210	E
T7	(South Africa) George Coetzee	69-69-72=210	E
T7	(United States) Davis Love III	70-68-72=210	E
T7	(Germany) Martin Kaymer	68-69-73=210	E

=== Final round ===
Sunday, 17 July 2011

Playing in his twentieth Open, 42-year-old Darren Clarke shot an even-par 70 in the final round to win his first major championship by three shots. Phil Mickelson, 41, began the day tied for seventh and five shots out of the lead. He charged to a 30 (−5) on the front nine, equalling his lowest nine-hole stretch in a major. Mickelson made eagle on the 7th hole to tie for the lead and added a birdie on the 10th to move to 6-under for the day. Clarke, the 54-hole leader in the final pairing a half-hour back, countered with his own eagle on the 7th to open up a two shot lead. A short missed par putt stalled Mickelson's momentum, and he faded on the back nine with three further bogeys to finish with a 68 (−2), tied for second with Dustin Johnson. Johnson, playing with Clarke, also made a strong challenge, and was two shots out of the lead on the tee of the par-5 14th hole. Johnson tried to reach the green with a 2 iron from the fairway, but pushed it right and out of bounds to end his chances with a double-bogey seven to fall four back. This gave Clarke a four-stroke cushion over his nearest rivals with four holes to play, and he cruised to victory even despite bogeys on his final two holes.

Clarke became the third Northern Irish champion in the past six majors, as well as the oldest debut major-winner, and oldest Open Champion, since Roberto De Vicenzo in 1967. Earlier in the day, Sergio García, playing his 49th consecutive major, had threatened to go low after being −4 for his round late on his front nine, but faded to a 68 (−2), and tied for ninth place. His 68 matched the low round of the day with Mickelson. Thomas Bjørn, eight years from his Open drama, produced another steady round to finish alone in fourth. Tom Watson, at 61 the oldest player to complete all four days at an Open, fired his third 72 of the week and finished in a tie for 22nd. Simon Dyson tied for 9th to take honours as the low Englishman.

Place	Player	Score	To par	Money (£)
1	(Northern Ireland) Darren Clarke	68-68-69-70=275	−5	900,000
T2	(United States) Dustin Johnson	70-68-68-72=278	−2	427,447
T2	(United States) Phil Mickelson	70-69-71-68=278	−2	427,447
4	(Denmark) Thomas Bjørn	65-72-71-71=279	−1	260,000
T5	(United States) Chad Campbell	69-68-74-69=280	E	181,666
T5	(United States) Rickie Fowler	70-70-68-72=280	E	181,666
T5	(United States) Anthony Kim	72-68-70-70=280	E	181,666
8	(France) Raphaël Jacquelin	74-67-71-69=281	+1	134,502
T9	(England) Simon Dyson	68-72-72-70=282	+2	104,333
T9	(Spain) Sergio García	70-70-74-68=282	+2	104,333
T9	(United States) Davis Love III	70-68-72-72=282	+2	104,333

Amateurs: Lewis (+9), Uihlein (+12).

==== Scorecard ====
Hole	1	2	3	4	5	6	7	8	9	10	11	12	13	14	15	16	17	18
Par	4	4	3	4	4	3	5	4	4	4	3	4	4	5	4	3	4	4
(Northern Ireland) Clarke	−5	−6	−6	−5	−5	−5	−7	−7	−7	−7	−7	−7	−7	−7	−7	−7	−6	−5
(United States) Johnson	−4	−4	−3	−3	−3	−2	−3	−3	−3	−4	−4	−5	−5	−3	−3	−3	−3	−2
(United States) Mickelson	E	−1	−1	−2	−2	−3	−5	−5	−5	−6	−5	−5	−4	−4	−3	−2	−2	−2
(Denmark) Bjørn	−2	−2	−2	−1	−1	−2	−2	−3	−3	−3	−3	−3	−3	−3	−2	−2	−1	−1
(United States) Campbell	+2	+1	E	E	E	E	−1	E	+1	+1	+1	E	E	E	E	+1	+1	E
(United States) Fowler	−2	−2	−2	−2	−2	−2	−2	−2	−2	−2	−2	−2	−2	−1	−1	E	E	E
(United States) Kim	E	−1	−1	E	E	E	−1	−1	−1	−1	−1	−2	−2	−2	−1	−1	−1	E

Cumulative tournament scores, relative to par

Eagle	Birdie	Bogey	Double bogey
