= Kevin Abosch =

Irish conceptual artist

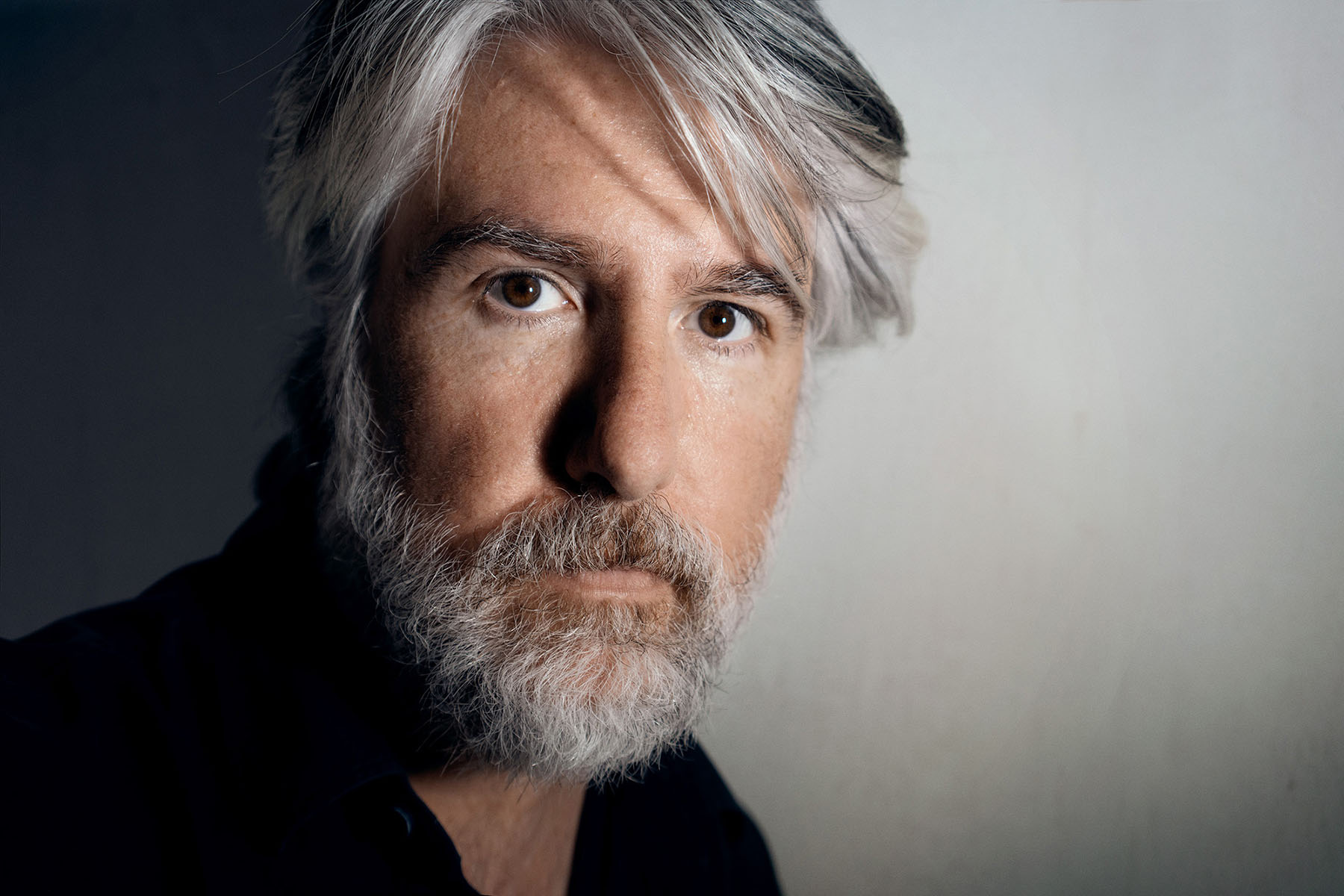
- Born: December 1969 (age 56)
- Known for: Conceptual Art, AI art Photography, Installation art, NFTs and generative art

Kevin Abosch (/ˈeɪbɒʃ/ AY-bosh; born 1969) is an Irish conceptual artist and pioneer in cryptoart known for his works in photography, blockchain, sculpture, installation, AI and film. Abosch's work addresses the nature of identity, value and human currency and has been exhibited throughout the world, often in civic spaces, including The Hermitage Museum, The National Gallery of Ireland, The National Museum of China, The Irish Museum of Modern Art, The Museum of Contemporary Art Vojvodina, The Bogotá Museum of Modern Art, ZKM, Galerie nationale du Jeu de Paume, and Dublin Airport.

== Selected works and projects ==
=== Utopian Propagation ===
On 28 October 2016 Abosch installed a work entitled "Impossible Promises" consisting of 100 painted oil barrels in the Millennium Park at the Bogotá Museum of Modern Art

=== Potato #345 ===
In 2015, Abosch's photographic work of a potato, "Potato #345" was reportedly sold to an unnamed businessman in Europe for a €1,000,000. The photo was taken in 2010 and is one of three versions of the print in existence.

=== I AM A COIN ===
In January 2018 Abosch created 10,000,000 virtual artworks consisting of crypto-tokens on the Ethereum Blockchain.

=== Forever Rose ===
On 14 February 2018 Abosch's virtual artwork "Forever Rose", consisting of a single ERC-20 token on the Ethereum blockchain, sold to a group of ten art collectors for a record-breaking USD$1 million.

=== Yellow Lambo ===
The artwork is composed of 42 inline alphanumerics in yellow neon representing the blockchain contract address for a crypto token called YLAMBO, which Abosch also created. Abosch named the artwork after the hashtag #lambo, which cryptocurrency enthusiasts often use in online forums. On 26 April 2018, at the "If So, What?" art fair in San Francisco, California, Abosch's sculpture entitled "Yellow Lambo" was sold to former Skype COO Michael Jackson for US$400,000, more than the base price of a 2018 Lamborghini Aventador motor car.

=== PRICELESS ===
A collaboration between Abosch and Chinese artist Ai Weiwei primarily made up of two standard ERC-20 tokens on the Ethereum blockchain, called PRICELESS (PRCLS is its symbol). One of these tokens is forever unavailable to anyone, but the other is meant for distribution and is divisible up to 18 decimal places, meaning it can be given away one quintillionth at a time. A nominal amount of the distributable token was “burned” (put into digital wallets with the keys thrown away), and these wallet addresses were printed on paper and sold to art buyers in a series of 12 physical works. Each wallet address alphanumeric is a proxy for a shared moment between Abosch and Ai.

=== 1111 series ===
The series, described as the first AI and cryptographic NFT (Non-Fungible Tokens) art project of this scale, comprises 1,111 unique generative artworks minted on OpenSea starting March 23, 2021, by Kevin Abosch. The works feature automated hash data represented as figurative NFTs. As of May 2024, the series includes only 999 pieces, with 112 NFTs having been 'burnt' by the artist—sent to the ETH burn address, rendering them unavailable for sale.

In April 2021, Abosch announced his intention to launch a satellite to study climate change and to create and distribute NFTs to the owners of 1111s. These NFTs are to be airdropped directly into the owners' wallets. As of May 2024, the launch date for the satellite remains pending.

== National Gallery of Ireland ==
In December 2013 the National Gallery of Ireland acquired three photographic portraits by Abosch for inclusion in the permanent National Portrait Collection. The portraits are of Bob Geldof, Olwen Fouéré and Brian O'Driscoll.

== Animoca Brands ==
Kevin Abosch is creative director for Animoca Brands.
