= Ben Clarke (footballer, born 1911) =

Northern Irish footballer

Personal information
- Full name: Benjamin Clarke
- Date of birth: 6 August 1911
- Place of birth: Ballymena, Ireland
- Date of death: 29 October 1981 (aged 70)
- Place of death: Dungannon, Northern Ireland
- Height: 5 ft 8 1/2 in (1.74 m)
- Position: Full back

Senior career*
Years	Team	Apps	(Gls)
1931–1932	Dungannon Town		
1932–1934	Portadown		
1934–1937	Sheffield United	10	(0)
1937–1939	Exeter City	40	(1)
1939	Carlisle United	2	(0)
1939	Coleraine		
- Portadown

International career
1934	Ireland Amateurs	2	(0)
- * Club domestic league appearances and goals

Benjamin Clarke (6 August 1911 – 29 October 1981) was a Northern Irish football full back who played in the Football League for Exeter City, Sheffield United and Carlisle United. His son Godfrey also became a footballer and his grandson is golfer Darren Clarke. His nephews Joe and Derek Meldrum appeared for the Distillery team which played Benfica in the 1963 European Cup.

== Early life ==
Clarke was born at Ballygarvey just outside Ballymena, County Antrim, Ireland. His father Nathaniel was a horse trainer. By 1915 the family were living in the Milltown area of Dungannon, County Tyrone. His early employment was at the factory of Messrs Dickson & Co., Dungannon.

== Football career ==
=== Early Days ===
By 1931, Clarke was part of the Dungannon Town team, who were competing in Mid Ulster Junior football. He was part of the team which won the Mid Ulster Shield in 1932. He also was selected for several representative teams.

His performances led to a move to Irish League side Portadown in 1932. After gaining a regular first team place, he helped the side to win their first senior trophy, the Gold Cup in 1933. He also gained a place on the Ireland Amateur team, winning two caps against England and Scotland in 1934. By this stage he was drawing the attention of English League Clubs. In May 1934, an offer in the region of £2500 – £3000 was accepted from Division 2 side Sheffield United (The club had been relegated; for the first time, from Division 1 the previous season, however they had previously had mid table finishes).

=== Career in England ===
Clarke was with Sheffield United for three years. He made sporadic appearances for the first team, mainly playing for the reserves. The first choice right-back being club captain Harry Hooper. His first appearance of the 1935–36 season came in a 2-0 Home win against local rivals Barnsley, in April 1936. This came about due to an injury sustained by Hooper. His previous first team appearance had been against Nottingham Forest on cup final day of the previous season. He also played in the next match a draw away to Port Vale. However Hooper retook his place, after recovering from injury, to captain the side for the final of the 1936 FA Cup, which ended in 1–0 victory for Arsenal.

By 1937, Clarke was looking for a new club and joined Third Division South side Exeter City, in August. Early in his time at Exeter, with the team struggling, he was deployed as centre-forward, having scored eight goals in two games for the reserves. He was released by the club at the end of the 1938–39 season.

He subsequently joined Carlisle United, a Third Division North side in June 1939. However the league was suspended after only three matches, due to the outbreak of war.

=== Return to Northern Ireland ===
By December 1939, Clarke, had joined Irish League side Coleraine as their player manager. He guided the club to eighth position in the league (1939–40 season), an improvement on 14th (bottom), the previous season. By 1945, he was again playing for Portadown, who were an Intermediate League team at the time. In 1949, he was involved in the formation of Dungannon Swifts and subsequently became their player coach. He led the team to numerous successes in their early years.
