= Benjamin Clarke (priest) =

Benjamin Strettell Clarke was the third Archdeacon of Liverpool, serving from 1887 until his death on 18 November 1895.

Jones was educated at Trinity College, Dublin and ordained in 1846. He was appointed the Perpetual curate at Christ Church Southport in 1849. Later he was the incumbent at Eccleston, Cheshire. His sons were also Anglican priests.
