= Percy Baker (cricketer) =

English cricketer (1874–1939)

Personal information
- Full name: Percy Charles Baker
- Born: 2 May 1874; Bromley, Kent
- Died: 30 December 1939 (aged 65); Northwood, London
- Batting: Right-handed
- Relatives: Herbert Baker (brother)

Domestic team information
- Years: Team
- 1900–1902: Kent

Career statistics
Competition	First-class
Matches	41
Runs scored	1,600
Batting average	24.61
100s/50s	2/10
Top score	130
Catches/stumpings	14/–
- Source: CricInfo, 18 March 2017

Percy Charles Baker (2 May 1874 – 30 December 1939) was an English amateur cricketer who played for Kent County Cricket Club. He was born in Bromley in Kent and played for Beckenham Cricket Club. His performances for Beckenham earned him a trial for Kent and he played 41 first-class cricket matches for the county between 1900 and 1902. He was a right-handed batsman.

== Early life ==
Baker was born at Bromley in Kent, one of the six sons and two daughters of Alfred and Alice Baker. His father was a stockbroker and Baker attended Uppingham School from September 1887, although he did not play regularly for the school cricket team. He went up to Christ Church, Oxford in 1892, graduating in 1896 before becoming a stockbroker himself.

== Cricket career ==
Baker played club cricket for Beckenham alongside his brothers Alfred and Herbert. He established a reputation as an "aggressive, hard-driving batsman" in club cricket, and on the strength of his form for Beckenham made his debut for Kent against Essex at Mote Park in Maidstone in May 1900. He played 18 times for the county during the 1900 season and 19 times the following year in a Kent team which was described as "a very strong batting team". His 738 runs in 1900 was third highest, beaten only by Jack Mason and Cuthbert Burnup and included a score of 130 runs made against Nottinghamshire in under three hours.

Baker was described in his Wisden obituary as playing some "brilliant, forceful innings" using "powerful driving" to score runs, and he scored 850 runs in 1901, with another century. His professional life began to take more of this time and he made only four appearances in 1902, playing his final first-class match for Kent against Yorkshire at Bradford in May 1902. Baker scored 1,600 runs for the county, including two centuries, and was awarded his county cap in 1900.

== War service ==
Baker was 40 at the outbreak of World War I in August 1914 and was not eligible to serve until the age of conscription was raised to 51 in 1918. He enlisted in the Essex Regiment in April 1918, serving in the 18th Battalion of the regiment, a home service battalion in a garrison role at Great Yarmouth. In December 1918, a few weeks after the armistice with Germany which ended the war, he was transferred to the Royal Army Service Corps (RASC), serving as a driver in the Motor Transport Depot at Sydenham in Kent. He was demobilised in March 1919.

== Family and later life ==
Baker's brother, Herbert, was a major force in Beckenham Cricket Club in the years before World War I and also played for Kent. Baker died in Northwood in December 1939 aged 65.

== Bibliography ==
- Carlaw, Derek (2020). Kent County Cricketers, A to Z: Part One (1806–1914) (PDF). Cardiff: ACS.
