= William Taylor (Archdeacon of Liverpool) =

William Francis Taylor, DD (1820 – 19 March 1906) was an Archdeacon in the Diocese of Liverpool.

Taylor was educated at Trinity College, Dublin; and ordained in 1848. After curacies in Tranmere and Claughton he served incumbencies; St John, Liverpool; St Silas, Liverpool; St Chrysostom, Everton; and St Andrew, Toxteth Park. He was Chaplain to the Bishop of Liverpool, Rural Dean of Walton, an Honorary Canon of Liverpool Cathedral Archdeacon of Warrington 1889-95 and finally Archdeacon of Liverpool from 1895 until his death.

He was the father of Austin Taylor, who served as a Member of Parliament (MP) for Liverpool East Toxteth from 1902 to 1910, Gerald Kyffin-Taylor, MP for Liverpool Kirkdale from 1910 to 1915, and judge William Kyffin-Taylor, 1st Baron Maenan.
