= Hubert Wilkinson =

Anglican priest

Hubert Seed Wilkinson (7 June 1897 – 5 May 1984) was an Anglican priest in the 20th Century.

He served in the Royal Artillery from 1916 to 1919 when he entered Durham University. After a curacy in Colne he held incumbencies in Harpurhey, Chester-le-Street, Allerton, Winster, Ambleside and Grassendale. He was Archdeacon of Westmorland from 1947 to 1951; and Archdeacon of Liverpool from 1951 to 1970.
