= Ideford Common =

Coordinates: 50.5960°N 3.5560°W

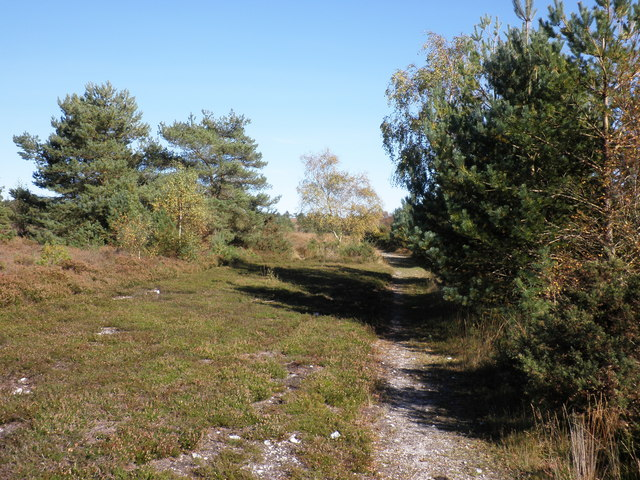
A bridleway on Ideford Common

Ideford Common is a Site of Special Scientific Interest consisting of an area of lowland heath in Devon, England. The site is a habitat for nightjars and Dartford warblers, and is the site of several Bronze Age cairns and a barrow.

Ideford and Haldon Forest are nearby.
