= Graeme Spiers =

Archdeacon of Liverpool

Graeme Hendry Gordon Spiers (15 January 1925 – 20 June 2007) was a clergyman in the Church of England.

Spiers was educated at the Mercers' School and the London College of Divinity. He was with the Westminster Bank from 1941 to 1949, also serving in the RNVR from 1943 to 1947. He was ordained in 1953. After a curacy in Addiscombe he was Succentor of Bradford Cathedral. He held incumbencies at Speke and Aigburth. He was appointed Archdeacon of Liverpool in 1979 and resigned in 1991.
