= Percy Baker (archdeacon) =

English Archdeacon

John Percy Baker (9 February 1871 – 28 December 1947) was Archdeacon of Warrington from 1934 until shortly before his death.

Baker was educated at Kimbolton Grammar School, King Edward's School, Birmingham, Emmanuel College, Cambridge and Ridley Hall, Cambridge; and ordained in 1894. He was a curate at St Aubyn, Devonport (1894–98) then St Andrew, Plymouth, (1898–1901); Vicar of Ellacombe (1901–09) then Mossley Hill (1921–35); Prebendary of Exeter Cathedral (1920–34); and Examining Chaplain to the Bishop of Liverpool (1928–44).
