= Jonathan Kaye =

American professional golfer (born 1970)

Personal information
- Full name: Jonathan Andrew Kaye
- Nationality: United States
- Born: August 2, 1970 (age 56) Denver, Colorado, U.S.
- Height: 5 ft 10 in (1.78 m)
- Weight: 165 lb (75 kg; 11.8 st)

Career
- Sport: Golf
- College: University of Colorado
- Turned professional: 1993
- Former tour: PGA Tour
- Professional wins: 4
- Highest ranking: 14 (February 1, 2004)

Number of wins by tour
- PGA Tour: 2
- Other: 2

Best results in major championships
- Masters Tournament: T43: 2001, 2005
- PGA Championship: T51: 2000
- U.S. Open: T10: 2003
- The Open Championship: CUT: 2003, 2004

Jonathan Andrew Kaye (born August 2, 1970) is an American professional golfer who played on the PGA Tour.

== Early life ==
Kaye was born in Denver, Colorado, and is Jewish. He attended Sunnyslope High School in Phoenix, Arizona, where he was a star in golf, graduating in 1988. Kaye graduated from the University of Colorado in 1993.

== Professional career ==
Kaye turned pro the year he graduated from college. Kaye successfully graduated from 1994 PGA Tour Qualifying School started playing on tour the following year.

Kaye has won twice on the PGA Tour, at the 2003 Buick Classic and the 2004 FBR Open, and he has over 30 top-10 finishes. He is a self-taught player who has never had a teacher. "There's nobody who could teach my swing," he has said.

Kaye has featured in the top 20 of the Official World Golf Ranking, though he has not played a PGA Tour event since 2011. Kaye briefly reappeared on the Web.com Tour in 2014, playing in three events and making the cut once with a T65 at the Panama Claro Championship. He also played on the Web.com Tour in 2017. In July 2017, 21 years after winning his first Colorado Open, he won it again with a record-tying 23-under-par 265 in the 53rd CoBank Colorado Open, earning $100,000.

=== 2001 incident ===
Kaye was the co-leader at the 2001 Michelob Championship at Kingsmill after the second round. As he was heading to the locker room, a security guard refused him entry without his player ID badge, which Kaye then found and clipped provocatively to his belt buckle or the zipper of his pants. The guard took offense, and PGA Tour commissioner Tim Finchem reportedly suspended Kaye for two months (but the PGA Tour never divulges or even acknowledges player suspensions).

== Professional wins (4) ==
=== PGA Tour wins (2) ===
No.	Date	Tournament	Winning score	Margin of victory	Runner-up
1	Jun 22, 2003	Buick Classic	−13 (70-66-68-67=271)	Playoff	(United States) John Rollins
2	Feb 1, 2004	FBR Open	−18 (65-68-66-67=266)	2 strokes	(United States) Chris DiMarco

PGA Tour playoff record (1–1)

No.	Year	Tournament	Opponent	Result
1	2002	Reno–Tahoe Open	(United States) Chris Riley	Lost to par on first extra hole
2	2003	Buick Classic	(United States) John Rollins	Won with eagle on first extra hole

=== Other wins (2) ===
- 1996 Colorado Open
- 2017 Colorado Open

== Results in major championships ==
Tournament	2000	2001	2002	2003	2004	2005
Masters Tournament		T43			CUT	T43
U.S. Open	CUT			T10	CUT	
The Open Championship			DQ	CUT	CUT	
PGA Championship	T51	T63	CUT	T61	CUT	CUT

Top 10
Did not play

CUT = missed the half-way cut
DQ = disqualified
"T" = tied

== Results in The Players Championship ==
Tournament	2000	2001	2002	2003	2004	2005	2006
The Players Championship	CUT	T18	T57	T32	CUT	T53	CUT

CUT = missed the halfway cut
"T" indicates a tie for a place

== Results in World Golf Championships ==
Tournament	2001	2002	2003	2004	2005
Match Play	R64			R64	R64
Championship	NT^{1}		20	T59	
Invitational			2	T65	

^{1}Cancelled due to 9/11

Top 10
Did not play

QF, R16, R32, R64 = Round in which player lost in match play
"T" = Tied
NT = No tournament

== See also ==
- 1994 PGA Tour Qualifying School graduates
- 1998 PGA Tour Qualifying School graduates
- 2006 PGA Tour Qualifying School graduates
- List of Jewish golfers
