= Archdeacons in the Diocese of Liverpool =

Clergy in the Church of England

The archdeacons in the Diocese of Liverpool are senior ecclesiastical officers in the Church of England in a highly irregular area surrounding the city of Liverpool. This includes the archdeacons of Liverpool, St Helens and Warrington, Knowsley and Sefton, and Wigan and West Lancashire, each responsible for a specific geographical region within the diocese. They are tasked with the disciplinary supervision of the clergy within their respective archdeaconries.

== History ==
The Archdeaconry of Liverpool was originally created on 10 August 1847 (from the Archdeaconry of Chester deaneries of Wirral and Warrington) in the Diocese of Chester and transferred to the Diocese of Liverpool when the latter was created on 9 April 1880. The Archdeaconry of Warrington was created from the Archdeaconry of Liverpool on 17 July 1880. Prior to the 2015 reorganisation, the old Liverpool archdeaconry consisted of eight area deaneries: Bootle, Huyton, Liverpool North, Liverpool South-Childwall, Sefton, Toxteth and Wavertree, Walton, and West Derby; and the old Warrington archdeaconry of seven: North Meols, Ormskirk, St Helens, Warrington, Widnes, Wigan, and Winwick.

== Reorganisation ==
Per the diocese's mission paper, Fit for Mission, prepared by Paul Bayes, the then-new Bishop of Liverpool, the archdeaconries of the diocese were reorganised not long after the retirement of Peter Bradley as Archdeacon of Warrington at the end of October 2015. On 29 May 2015, it was announced that four archdeaconries would exist after the reorganisation: Liverpool (reduced in size from its current area), Knowsley and Sefton, St Helens and Warrington, and Wigan and West Lancashire; on 9 August three archdeacons-designate were announced, and it was further indicated it was hoped the reorganisation could be completed in time to collate the new archdeacons on 14 November 2015. On 5 November 2015, it was announced that Bayes had signed the pastoral order effecting the boundary changes and erection of the new archdeaconries.

Following the reorganisation, the (reduced) Liverpool archdeaconry consists of five deaneries: Liverpool North, Liverpool South-Childwall, Toxteth and Wavertree, Walton, and West Derby; Knowsley and Sefton archdeaconry of four: Bootle, Huyton, North Meols, and Sefton; St Helens and Warrington archdeaconry of four: St Helens, Warrington, Widnes, and Winwick; and Wigan and West Lancashire archdeaconry of two: Ormskirk, and Wigan.

At Bishop's Council in May 2023, it was agreed that the (vacant) Archdeaconry of Wigan and West Lancashire would be dissolved, the deanery of Wigan moved to St Helens archdeaconry, and the deanery of Ormskirk to Knowsley archdeaconry. On 1 November 2024, a Bishop's Pastoral Order gave effect to the council's decision.

== List of archdeacons ==
=== Archdeacons of Liverpool ===
- 29 September 1848 – 28 September 1855 (d.): Jonathan Brooks
- 30 October 1855 – 1886 (res.): John Jones

Since 9 April 1880, the archdeaconry has been in Liverpool diocese.
On 17 July 1880, the Archdeaconry of Warrington was split from the Liverpool archdeaconry.

- 1886–1887 (res.): John Bardsley, Vicar of St Saviour's, Liverpool
- 1887–1895: Benjamin Clarke, Vicar of Christ Church, Southport
- 1895–19 March 1906 (d.): William Taylor, Vicar of St Andrew, Toxteth Park
- 1906–26 December 1915 (d.): Thomas Madden, Vicar of St Luke's, Liverpool (until 1913) then Vicar of Christ Church, Southport
- 1916–7 February 1933 (d.): Hardwicke Spooner, Rector of Walton-on-the-Hill (until 1921)
- 1933–1934 (ret.): George Howson
- 1934–3 September 1950 (d.): Cyril Twitchett
- 1951–1970 (ret.): Hubert Wilkinson, Vicar of St Mary's, Grassendale, (until 1968; afterwards archdeacon emeritus)
- 1971–1979 (res.): Eric Corbett
- 1979–1991 (ret.): Graeme Spiers, Vicar of Aigburth (until 1980; afterwards archdeacon emeritus)
- 1991–1993 (res.): Stanton Durant, Vicar of All Saints, Stoneycroft
- 1994–2002 (ret.): Robert Metcalf (afterwards archdeacon emeritus)
- 2002 – 6 May 2017 (ret.): Ricky Panter

Much of the territory of the archdeaconry was given to the new Knowsley and Sefton archdeaconry.

- 10 September 2017 – January 2023 (res.): Mike McGurk
- 9 September 2023 – present: Miranda Threlfall-Holmes (Acting since 1 February 2023)

=== Archdeacons of Warrington and of St Helens and Warrington ===
The archdeaconry was erected from the Liverpool archdeaconry on 17 July 1880.

- 1880–1886 (res.): John Bardsley, Vicar of St Saviour's, Liverpool (became Archdeacon of Liverpool)
- 1887–1889 (res.): William Lefroy, perpetual curate of St Andrew's, Liverpool (became Dean of Norwich)
- 1889–1895 (res.): William Taylor, Vicar of St Chrysostom, Everton (until 1890), then Vicar of St Andrew, Toxteth Park (became Archdeacon of Liverpool)
- 1895–1906 (res.): Thomas Madden, Vicar of St Luke's, Liverpool (became Archdeacon of Liverpool)
- 1906–1916 (res.): Hardwicke Spooner, Rector of Walton-on-the-Hill (became Archdeacon of Liverpool)
- 1916–1933 (res.): George Howson, Rector of Woolton (until 1923; became Archdeacon of Liverpool)
- 1933–1934 (res.): Cyril Twitchett (became Archdeacon of Liverpool)
- 1934–1947 (ret.): Percy Baker, Vicar of Mossley Hill (until 1935), then Rector of Winwick (afterwards archdeacon emeritus)
- 1947–1958 (ret.): Arthur White, Vicar of Billinge (until 1950; afterwards archdeacon emeritus)
- 1959–1970 (ret.): Eric Evans, Rector of North Meols (until 1968; afterwards archdeacon emeritus)
- 1970–1981 (res.): John Lawton, Rector of Winwick (afterwards archdeacon emeritus)
- 1981–2001 (ret.): David Woodhouse, Vicar of St Peter's, Hindley (until 1992; afterwards archdeacon emeritus)
- 2001 – 31 October 2015 (ret.): Peter Bradley

The archdeaconry was renamed on 5 November 2015.

- 14 November 2015 – 30 September 2019 (res.): Roger Preece
- 25 January 2020 – present: Simon Fisher

=== Archdeacons of Knowsley and Sefton ===
The archdeaconry was erected on 5 November 2015.

- 14 November 2015–present: Pete Spiers

=== Archdeacons of Wigan and West Lancashire ===
The archdeaconry was erected on 5 November 2015.

- 14 November 2015 – 31 July 2021 (res.): Jennifer McKenzie

The archdeaconry was dissolved on 1 November 2024.

== Sources ==
- Horn, Joyce M.; Smith, David M.; Mussett, Patrick (2004), Fasti Ecclesiae Anglicanae 1541–1857, vol. 11, pp. 49–50
