= List of works by Sharpe and Paley =

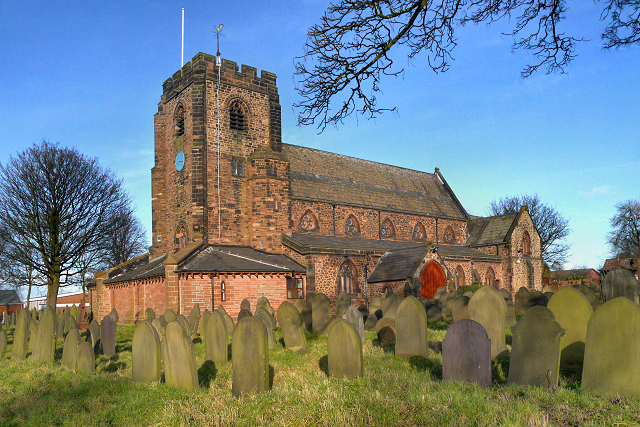
St Nicholas' Church, St Helens, a new church designed by the practice, built between 1847 and 1849

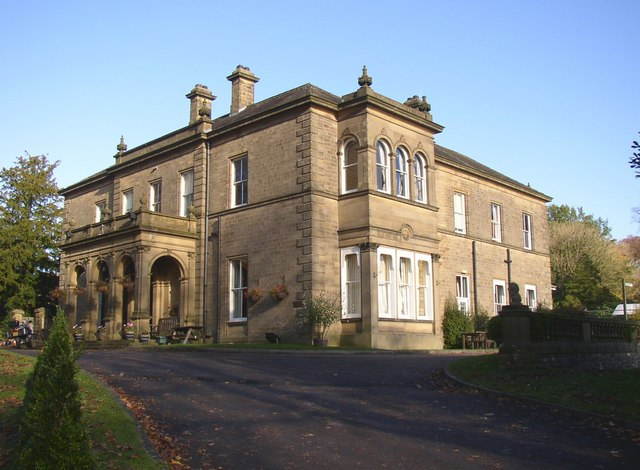
Newfield Hall, a new country house built in 1856

Sharpe and Paley was a partnership of two architects who practised from an office in Lancaster, Lancashire, England, between 1845 and 1856. Founded by Edmund Sharpe in 1835, the practice flourished for more than a century, until 1946. It had grown to become the largest in northwest England by the late 19th century and was responsible for the design of many important buildings, especially churches. In 1838 Sharpe took as his pupil the 15-year-old Edward Graham Paley, usually known as E. G. Paley. The two formed a partnership in 1845, following which Sharpe took an increasing interest in activities outside the practice. By 1847 Paley was responsible for most of the firm's work, and was carrying out commissions independently from at least 1849. Sharpe formally withdrew from the practice in 1851, although it continued to trade as Sharpe and Paley until 1856.

During Sharpe's time as sole principal the practice was involved mainly with ecclesiastical work, although it also undertook commissions for country houses and smaller projects. The type of work undertaken by the Sharpe and Paley partnership continued much as before, mostly on churches: designing new churches, repairing, rebuilding, and making additions and alterations to existing ones. Many of the alterations to medieval churches were done in the course of restoration work, in an effort to return the structure to its main style, or to what the architect considered to have been the best medieval style, usually that of the 13th and 14th centuries. New churches designed during the partnership include St Nicholas, Wrea Green and Christ Church, Bacup. Work on existing churches included rebuilding most of All Saints, Wigan, and restoring St Oswald, Warton. Most of the practice's ecclesiastical work was for the Church of England, but Sharpe and Paley also designed a new Roman Catholic church, St Mary, Yealand Conyers.

The work carried out on country houses included Wennington Hall, a new house, and additions and alterations to existing houses, including Hornby Castle and Dalton Castle. Other non-ecclesiastical commissions included converting the former gatehouse of Furness Abbey into the Furness Abbey Hotel, designing the North Western Hotel in Morecambe, a new charity school for girls in Lancaster now known as Windermere House, additional buildings for Lancaster Royal Grammar School, new militia barracks in Lancaster, and alterations to the Grand Theatre in Lancaster. Most of the work undertaken by the partnership was local, in Lancashire and the neighbouring counties, but some commissions were further afield; new churches were built in Warwickshire, County Durham, and North Yorkshire. Alterations were made to existing churches in North Yorkshire, the East Riding of Yorkshire, County Durham, and Leicestershire. The practice also designed a music hall in Settle, North Yorkshire, and Newfield Hall, a new country house in Airton, North Yorkshire.

This list contains the major works executed by the practice from the creation of the partnership of Sharpe and Paley in 1845 until its formal change of name in 1856. For details of the works carried out by the practice during other periods see Lists of works by Sharpe, Paley and Austin. For more information about the practice as a whole, see Sharpe, Paley and Austin.

== Key ==
Grade	Criteria
I	Buildings of exceptional interest, sometimes considered to be internationally important
II*	Particularly important buildings of more than special interest
II	Buildings of national importance and special interest
"—" denotes a work that is not listed.

== Works ==
Name	Location	Photograph	Date (Note: The dates given in this column are the year, or years, in which the work was carried out. Sources vary in the dates they provide; the dates used are those given in Brandwood et al., which is the most comprehensive source.)	Notes	Grade
All Saints' Church	Wigan, Greater Manchester; 53.5460°N 2.6328°W	A church with a tower separate from the body of the church, joined by an archway	1845–50	The church dates from the 15th century. It was rebuilt, except the tower, two turrets, and the north chapel, by Sharpe and Paley. This was executed in Perpendicular style at the request of the parishioners, who wished to replicate the style of the former church.	II*
St Mary's Church	Conistone, North Yorkshire; 54.1039°N 2.0306°W	A small low church with a bellcote at the far end	1846	Dating from the 11th or 12th century, this was a Norman church. Sharpe and Paley added a chancel, and rebuilt the nave and north aisle. In doing so, they continued to use Norman features in their new building.	II
St Peter's Church	Bishopton, County Durham; 54.5851°N 1.4364°W	A church with a large battlemented tower	1846–47	The church probably originated in the 13th century. Sharpe and Paley added the tower and north aisle, rebuilt the east wall, and the south wall above the level of the windows, renewed the windows, and replaced the Norman chancel arch with a pointed arch.	II
Bridlington Priory	Bridlington, East Riding of Yorkshire; 54.0944°N 0.2018°W	The end of an elaborate church with two towers, one flat-topped, the other with pinnacles	1846–55	The priory was founded in about 1113. Sharpe and Paley were commissioned to carry out repairs and restoration, which took place from 1846 until George Gilbert Scott took over in 1855. Their work included a new roof for the nave and restoration of three bays, some reglazing, and the provision of six terracotta angels for the hammerbeam ends.	I
St Michael's Church	Bolton-le-Sands, Lancashire; 54.1028°N 2.7917°W	A church with two gables and a battlemented tower at the far end	1847	The practice undertook a series of alterations and additions during the 19th century, leaving only the tower and the north arcade from the 15th-century church. In 1847 Sharpe and Paley rebuilt the chancel, with stained glass in the east window by William Wailes. The church was later re-dedicated and known as Holy Trinity Church.	II*
Lee Bridge	Lee, Over Wyresdale, Lancashire; 53.9910°N 2.6597°W	—	1847	Sharpe, then Paley, were appointed as Bridgemasters of the Hundred of South Lonsdale. As part of their duties, they designed this single-arched sandstone bridge over the Tarnbrook Wyre.	II
Furness Abbey Hotel	Barrow-in-Furness, Cumbria; 54.1375°N 3.1985°W	—	1847–48	The manor house on the site of the gatehouse of Furness Abbey was no longer in use, and Sharpe and Paley converted it into a hotel for the Furness Railway. In 1953–54 it was demolished, other than part of the north wing.	II
North Western Hotel	Morecambe, Lancashire; 54.0721°N 2.8754°W	—	1847–48	The hotel was built for the "Little" North Western Railway at a cost of £4,795 (equivalent to £490,000 as of 2025). It was constructed in stone, had two storeys, and contained forty bedrooms. Its name was changed in 1871 to the Midland Hotel. It was demolished in 1933 and replaced by the current Midland Hotel.	—
St Mary the Virgin's Church	Bottesford, Leicestershire; 52.9435°N 0.8001°W	A church with a tall slim steeple	1847–48	The 13th-century church was restored at a cost of £2,235 (equivalent to £230,000 as of 2025). The work included restoring the nave, aisles, and transepts, replacing the aisle roofs, adding pinnacles, reseating and re-flooring the interior, removing the west gallery, and inserting a tower screen.	I
Ince Hall	Ince, Cheshire	—	1847–49	An existing house, standing in the grounds of the ruined Stanlow Abbey, was extended in Italianate style for Eliza Jane Waldegrave, daughter of Sharpe's godfather Edmund Yates. The hall was demolished in the middle of the 20th century, and the site is now occupied by the Stanlow Refinery.	—
St Nicholas' Church	Sutton, St Helens, Merseyside; 53.4283°N 2.7211°W	A church with a battlemented west tower	1847–49	This was a new church in early 14th-century style costing more than £3,900 (equivalent to £430,000 as of 2025), of which King's College, Cambridge, patron of the church, contributed £1,270 in commemoration of the fourth centenary of its foundation. It was consecrated on 4 June 1849.	II
Hornby Castle	Hornby, Lancashire; 54.1114°N 2.6323°W	A battlemented house with three towers of different shapes	1847–51	Sharpe and Paley made extensive alterations, virtually replacing an extension added in about 1720, but maintaining older parts, including the 16th-century polygonal tower. The alterations are in Perpendicular style to match the other remaining parts of the building. The work included rebuilding the front of the castle, adding wings and a portico, and replacing the round tower with a square one. It cost at least £1,300 (equivalent to £160,000 as of 2025).	I
Capernwray Hall	Over Kellet, Lancaster, Lancashire; 54.1436°N 2.6959°W	A courtyard with a tower at the far end	1848	The practice carried out a sequence of works on the hall. On this occasion they added a stable and a service block.	II*
Savings Bank	New Street, Lancaster, Lancashire	—	1848–49	The savings bank was modified at a cost of £828 (equivalent to £90,000 as of 2025).	—
St Thomas' Church	Albany Road, Coventry, Warwickshire		1848–49	This was a Commissioners' Church, a grant of £230 being given towards its construction by the Church Building Commissioners, the total cost being £3,721 (equivalent to £410,000 as of 2025). Its architectural style was Decorated. It consisted of a five-bay nave with a clerestory, north and south aisles, a three-bay chancel with vestries, a north porch, and a northwest bell turret. The church was declared redundant in 1974 and demolished in 1976.	II
Holy Trinity Church	Thorpe Thewles, County Durham; 54.6052°N 1.3791°W	—	1848–49	Sharpe and Paley designed this new church to replace a church on a different site. It had an estimated cost of £600 (equivalent to £70,000 as of 2025), and provided seating for 175 people. By the 1880s it was suffering from damp and decay and was demolished to be replaced by another church in 1886–87.	—
St Oswald's Church	Warton, Lancashire; 54.1442°N 2.7695°W	A church with a battlemented west tower	1848–49	The restoration included rebuilding the piers of the south nave arcade, and the south chancel arcade, raising its arches to match those in the nave.	II
St Nicholas' Church and schools	Wrea Green, Lancashire; 53.7773°N 2.9155°W	A church with a central steeple	1848–49	This was a new church built at a cost of about £1,600 (equivalent to £180,000 as of 2025). It is in Early English style, and originally consisted of a nave and a chancel, the steeple and vestry being added later.	II
St Mary's Church	Lancaster, Lancashire; 54.0507°N 2.8057°W	A church with a west tower surmounted by battlements and pinnacles	1848–56	Alterations to the church were carried out in phases by the practice, and during this period they included work on the roof, removal of galleries and the insertion of a new west gallery, and replacement of the box pews with new seating. The church has since been renamed Lancaster Priory.	I
Littledale Hall	Caton-with-Littledale, Lancashire; 54.0524°N 2.6632°W	A house including a tower with a pyramidal roof	1849	This was a new country house in Jacobethan style built for Revd John Dodson. It has been attributed to Paley on stylistic grounds. As of 2013 it is occupied by a therapeutic community.	II
The Hermitage	Caton-with-Littledale, Lancashire; 54.0748°N 2.7329°W	—	1849	A new house designed for John Sharp, who was the solicitor to the "Little" North Western Railway. Its estimated cost was £1,800 (equivalent to £200,000 as of 2025). The house has been painted by J. M. W. Turner and others. It has since been converted into flats.	—
Windermere House	Lancaster, Lancashire; 54.0471°N 2.8026°W	A building in two storeys with five gables	1849–50	This was built as a school on an enlarged site to replace a Bluecoat school of 1772. It became known as the Lancaster Charity School for Girls, and is in Elizabethan Revival style. The building was converted into flats in 2007, and since has been called Windermere House.	II
New buildings, Giggleswick School	Giggleswick, North Yorkshire; 54.0725°N 2.2939°W	—	1849–51	Sharpe and Paley carried out additions to the school, including a library, a room for modern languages, a new porch, and 22 new windows.	—
National Schools	Lancaster, Lancashire	—	1850–51	The schools were built in St Leonard's Gate. They were demolished in the late 20th century.	—
St Saviour's Church	Ringley, Kearsley, Greater Manchester; 53.5436°N 2.3570°W	A church with an octagonal bell turret rising to a spire	1850–54	This was built to replace a church of 1826 designed by Charles Barry, which was demolished other than its tower. The new church was built in a position further back from the road, leaving the tower isolated. It was a Commissioners' Church, a grant of £200 being given towards its construction by the Church Building Commissioners. The total cost was £2,500 (equivalent to £240,000 as of 2025), of which £500 was given by the 13th Earl of Derby. Sharpe and Paley heightened the separate tower by 2 feet (0.6 m) in 1854.	II
St Stephen and All Martyrs School	Lever Bridge, Bolton, Greater Manchester	—	1851	The school was built for St Stephen's Church at an estimated cost of £1,000 (equivalent to £120,000 as of 2025). The site was given by the 2nd Earl of Bradford, and the school accommodated 400 students. It has since been demolished.	—
Infant school	Moor Road, Lancaster, Lancashire	—	1851	The school was built for Roman Catholics.	—
Lancaster Royal Grammar School	East Road, Lancaster, Lancashire; 54.0471°N 2.7901°W	Part of a building with an arched entrance over which is a statue in a niche	1851–52	Sharpe and Paley designed new buildings for the school, including a headmaster's house, in Tudor Revival style at a cost of £8,000 (equivalent to £970,000 as of 2025). Over the entrance is a statue of Queen Victoria. The school received its royal accolade in 1852.	II
St Walburga's Convent	Balmoral Road, Lancaster, Lancashire; 54.04673°N 2.7934°W	—	1851–53	The convent was built for the Sisters of Mercy of St Ethelburga's Church. It stands on the complex later occupied by Lancaster Cathedral, to which it is now joined by a corridor; it was the first building on the site. It is in Gothic Revival style and has an L-shaped plan.	II
St Gregory's Church	Preston Patrick, Cumbria; 54.2452°N 2.7119°W	Part of a church with a tower and a higher stair turret, both battlemented	1851–53	The church was built on the site of an earlier church, and was later re-dedicated to St Patrick. It cost about £1,400 (equivalent to £150,000 as of 2025). The church is in Perpendicular style, and incorporates material from the earlier church. It is constructed in limestone, and has a west tower with a stair turret rising to a greater height than the tower.	II
St Thomas' Church	Marton Street, Lancaster, Lancashire; 54.0461°N 2.7994°W	—	1852	Sharpe and Paley added a new steeple, lengthened the chancel, and converted the west gallery into an organ loft at a cost of over £4,000 (equivalent to £480,000 as of 2025). The stained glass in the new east window was by William Warrington, and the new tiles in the chancel floor and the reredos were made by Mintons.	II
St Mary's Church	Yealand Conyers, Lancashire; 54.1605°N 2.7613°W	The end of a church with a twin bellcote	1852	This was a new Roman Catholic church designed for Richard Gillow of Leighton Hall at a cost of between £1,100 and £1,200 (equivalent to £140,000 as of 2025). It is constructed in limestone and consists of a nave, a chancel and a north porch. At the west end is a double gabled bellcote.	II
St Peter's Church	Rylstone, North Yorkshire; 54.0255°N 2.0446°W	A church with a battlemented west tower	1852–53	St Peter's was a new church, constructed in gritstone at a cost of £1,700 (equivalent to £190,000 as of 2025). It has a west tower, and incorporates elements of both Decorated and Perpendicular styles.	II
Music Hall	Settle, North Yorkshire; 54.0688°N 2.2790°W	The front of a two-storey gabled building	1852–53	The music hall has since been altered and renamed the Victoria Hall. It is constructed in stone with a slate roof. The hall is in two storeys with an attic. The street front is in three bays, the central bay protruding slightly forwards. In the ground floor are three doorways, with three sash windows above, and a round window in the gable. Along the sides are more sash windows.	II
St Mary's Church	Walney Island, Cumbria; 54.1067°N 3.2474°W	—	1852–53	St Mary's was a new church, replacing an earlier church. It was built at an estimated cost of £520 (equivalent to £60,000 as of 2025), and provided seating for 184 people. It was a small church, without aisles, and with an octagonal bell turret. It was demolished when it was replaced in 1907–08 by a new church designed by Austin and Paley.	—
St John and All Saints' Church	Easingwold, North Yorkshire; 54.1236°N 1.1973°W	A long church with a battlemented west tower	1853	The church dates from the 15th century. It was restored and a new porch was added in memory of Paley's father, who had been vicar of the church between 1812 and 1839.	II*
Phoenix Foundry	Phoenix Street, Lancaster, Lancashire; 54°03′05″N 2°47′47″W	—	1853	The firm designed stables and other buildings for the foundry, Sharpe having become its proprietor in 1852. The foundry has been demolished.	—
St Mary's Church	Lawford, Essex; 51.9434°N 1.0380°E	A church tower with prominent buttresses and a small pyramidal roof	1853	The interior of the chancel was restored; this included a new east window, a new roof, and replacement of the stalls. It was carried out for the rector, Revd Charles Merivale, who had been an undergraduate at St John's College, Cambridge with Sharpe.	I
St Anne's Church	Thwaites, Cumbria; 54.2587°N 3.2633°W	A church with round clerestory windows and a bellcote at the junction of the nave and chancel	1853–54	This was a new church built to replace a chapel of ease on the other side of the road at a cost of £1,678 (equivalent to £160,000 as of 2025). It is in Decorated style, and consists of a nave with a clerestory, a south aisle, a chancel, and a north vestry. On the east end of the nave is a bellcote.	II
Christ Church	Bacup, Lancashire; 53.7067°N 2.1935°W	A church with a flat-topped tower and a stair turret	1854	Christ Church was a new church costing over £3,000 (equivalent to £290,000 as of 2025), and was paid for from the legacy of a local manufacturer, James Heyworth. It consists of a nave with a clerestory, aisles, a porch, a chancel, and a three-stage southwest tower. It is in Decorated style. The church closed in 2012.	II
Militia Barracks	South Road, Lancaster, Lancashire; 54.0444°N 2.7981°W	—	1854	The barracks were built for the First Royal Lancashire Militia in Scottish Baronial style on an H-plan. The main wing is symmetrical, in five bays and two storeys, with a central entrance. The cross-wings are in two bays, and have two storeys and attics, crowstepped gables, central finials, and corner turrets. The building has since been converted into offices.	II
St James' Church	Wrightington Bar, Lancashire; 53.6169°N 2.7175°W	A small church with a west bellcote	1854	This new church is small, constructed in sandstone, and consisting of a nave, a south aisle, a south porch, and a chancel with a bellcote on the west gable, which provided seating for 400 people. It was not consecrated until 1857.	II
Chapels, Lancaster Cemetery	Lancaster, Lancashire; 54.0504°N 2.7769°W	—	1855	The three chapels, Anglican, Roman Catholic, and Nonconformist, stand around the central point of the cemetery. They are all in Gothic Revival style. Two have a cruciform plan, the other being rectangular. Each chapel is designated separately as a listed building.	II
Lodge, Lancaster Cemetery	Quernmore Road, Lancaster, Lancashire; 54.0492°N 2.7793°W	—	1855	The lodge is constructed in sandstone with a slate roof, and has a T-shaped plan. It is in one and two storeys with attics. The windows are a mix of canted bay windows, transomed windows, and dormers.	II
The Greaves	Lancaster, Lancashire	—	1855–56	The Greaves was a private house that Paley built for himself in Scotforth.	—
St Mary's Church	Penwortham, Lancashire; 53.7552°N 2.7234°W	A church with a battlemented west tower	1855–56	Alterations were made to the church, including rebuilding the nave, adding aisles, restoring the chancel roof, inserting a chancel arch, opening the tower arch, and adding a west gallery.	II*
Wennington Hall	Wennington, Lancashire; 54.1290°N 2.5915°W	A country house with a large battlemented tower	1855–56	The country house was built for William Saunders in Tudor Revival style. It consists of a house and a connected stable block, both of which have towers with stair turrets rising higher than the tower; all of these are castellated. Other features include gables with finials, a canted two-storey bay window, and other windows that are mullioned and transomed. The house has later been used as a school.	II
Newfield Hall	Airton, North Yorkshire; 54.0190°N 2.1364°W	A stone house in two storeys, with an entrance portico and a two-story bay window	1856	Newfield Hall was built as a country house for the lawyer William Nicholson Alcock at a cost of £36,000 (equivalent to £3,350,000 as of 2025). It passed through the hands of various owners until it was damaged by fire in 1998 during refurbishment. It has since been used as a hotel by the Holiday Fellowship.	—
Dalton Castle	Dalton-in-Furness, Cumbria; 54.1556°N 3.1866°W	A squat, square, flat-topped tower	1856	This is a free-standing tower dating from the 14th century, thought to have been built as a courtroom and bailiff's house. Paley reduced it internally from three storeys to two and converted it into a Masonic lodge for the 5th Duke of Buccleuch.	I
Grand Theatre	Lancaster, Lancashire; 54.0502°N 2.7967°W	The side of a building with a small lantern on the roof	1856	The theatre was altered and extended for the Athenaeum Society; it had been bought by Sharpe in 1843.	II
Mechanics' Institute	Lancaster, Lancashire; 54.0487°N 2.8043°W	—	1856	The practice adapted an existing building, including the addition of extra rooms, for the Mechanics' Institute. The building was demolished and replaced in 1887 by the Storey Institute.	—
Sunday Schools	Lancaster, Lancashire; 54.0474°N 2.8030°W	—	1856	The Sunday Schools were built on the corner of High Street and Middle Street for the Congregationalists.	—
Church of St John the Divine	Preston, Lancashire; 53.7585°N 2.6961°W	An impressive church with a pinnacled west steeple	1856	Paley designed a Caen stone font for the church, and possibly added a groin vault to its tower. The church has subsequently been renamed St John's Minster.	II*

== Notes and references ==
Notes

Citations

Sources

- Brandwood, Geoff; Austin, Tim; Hughes, John; Price, James (2012), The Architecture of Sharpe, Paley and Austin, English Heritage, ISBN 978-1-84802-049-8
- Dixon, Roger; Muthesius, Stefan (1985) [1978], Victorian Architecture (Second ed.), London: Thames and Hudson, ISBN 978-0-500-20160-2
- Hartwell, Clare; Hyde, Matthew; Pevsner, Nikolaus (2004), Lancashire: Manchester and the South-East, The Buildings of England, Yale University Press, ISBN 0-300-10583-5
- Hartwell, Clare; Pevsner, Nikolaus (2009) [1969], Lancashire: North, The Buildings of England, Yale University Press, ISBN 978-0-300-12667-9
- Hughes, John M. (2010), Edmund Sharpe: Man of Lancaster (CD), John M. Hughes, OCLC 668355694
- Hyde, Matthew; Pevsner, Nikolaus (2010) [1967], Cumbria, The Buildings of England, Yale University Press, ISBN 978-0-300-12663-1
- Price, James (1998), Sharpe, Paley and Austin: A Lancaster Architectural Practice 1836–1942, Centre for North-West Regional Studies, ISBN 1-86220-054-8
- Pollard, Richard; Pevsner, Nikolaus (2006), Lancashire: Liverpool and the South-West, The Buildings of England, Yale University Press, ISBN 0-300-10910-5
