= Wheatsheaf =

A wheatsheaf is a sheaf of wheat

(The) Wheatsheaf may also refer to:

== Pubs ==
=== UK ===
- The Wheatsheaf, Camberley, in Surrey
- The Wheatsheaf, Fitzrovia, in Camden, London
- The Wheatsheaf, Littleborough, in Greater Manchester
- The Wheatsheaf, St Helens, in Merseyside
- The Wheatsheaf, Southwark, in London
- Wheatsheaf Inn, in Garstang, Lancashire

=== Elsewhere ===
- Wheatsheaf Hotel, Thebarton, Adelaide, South Australia

== Other uses ==
- Druid Park, formerly known as the Wheatsheaf Ground, Gosforth rugby union stadium near Newcastle-on-Tyne, England
- Wallaroo Wheatsheaf, later just Wheatsheaf, a newspaper published in Wallaroo, South Australia from 1911 to 1921
- Wheatsheaf Junction, a rail junction on the Wheatsheaf branch line, named after The Wheatsheaf public house near Wrexham, Wales
- Wheatsheaf Park (football stadium), sometimes called the Wheatsheaf, Staines Town football ground
