= Listed buildings in St Helens, Merseyside =

St Helens is a town in the Metropolitan Borough of St Helens, Merseyside, England. The unparished area contains 67 buildings that are recorded in the National Heritage List for England as designated listed buildings. Of these, one is listed at Grade I, the highest grade, five are listed at Grade II*, the middle of the three grades, and the others are at Grade II, the lowest grade. The main town in the district is St Helens, the others being Newton-le-Willows and Earlestown. Until the Industrial Revolution, the area was largely rural. Coal mining began in the 16th century, but modern industrial development began with the construction of the Sankey Canal in the late 18th century, linking St Helens with the River Mersey. The early 19th century saw new industries, including copper smelting, production of alkali, and the manufacture of glass. Of these, the major industry was glass making, the main business being that of Pilkingtons. The first major railway line in the world, the Liverpool and Manchester Railway was built through the district, opening in 1830.

The listed buildings in the district reflect its history. The earlier history is reflected by farmhouses and farm buildings, houses and cottages, and country houses, together with churches and associated structures. Structures associated with the Sankey Canal include locks and bridges. Associated with the railway are viaducts, a tunnel, a bridge, and stations. The later listed buildings include structures associated with glass industry, churches, public buildings, a war memorial, and a statue of Queen Victoria

== Key ==
Grade	Criteria
I	Buildings of exceptional interest, sometimes considered to be internationally important
II*	Particularly important buildings of more than special interest
II	Buildings of national importance and special interest

== Buildings ==
Name and location	Photograph	Date	Notes	Grade
Windleshaw Abbey; 53.46699°N 2.75510°W		c. 1453	The remains of a chantry chapel built in stone. They consist of a tower and walls that have been partly reconstructed. The tower contains a pointed entrance, a west window, and two-light bell openings. On the walls are memorials and a cross. The ruins are also a scheduled monument.	II*
159, 161 and 163 Crow Lane East; 53.45628°N 2.63105°W		16th century	A row of three cottages, partly timber-framed with brick infill, and partly in brick, containing four pairs of crucks, and with thatched roofs. They have a front of five bays, with nos. 159 and 161 in two storeys with casement windows, and no. 163 in a single storey with horizontally-sliding sash windows.	II*
Barn, Newton Park Farm; 53.45006°N 2.60692°W	—	16th to early 17th century	The timber-framed barn was encased in brick, and the west end was rebuilt in brick, in the 18th-19th century. It has a corrugated iron roof, and has fronts of seven bays. On each side are entrances with gabled porches, and there are outshuts on the north side.	II
Cross; 53.46694°N 2.75498°W	—	1627	This consists only of a shaft standing on a tapering base, itself on a wide step. It is incised with the date and with crosses. The cross is in a cemetery that in the 17th century was a Roman Catholic burial ground. The cross is also a scheduled monument.	II
158 and 160 High Street; 53.45852°N 2.62269°W	—	17th century	No. 158 is the earlier and is basically timber-framed; No. 160 dates from the 18th century. The building now consists of two houses with a three-bay front. The first bay is in two storeys, and the other two bays have one storey and an attic with two gabled dormers. The windows are sashes, most of which are horizontally-sliding.	II
Pear Tree Farmhouse; 53.46829°N 2.68768°W	—	17th century	A former farmhouse in brick with a stone slate roof. It is in two storeys, and has a two-bay front. The central doorway has panelled pilasters, a frieze and a cornice. The windows are sashes, some of those at the rear being horizontally-sliding.	II
The Grange; 53.45889°N 2.66969°W	—	17th century	The earliest part is the rear wing, and most of the farmhouse dates from the early 19th century. It is built in brick, with some stone in the rear wing, and has a slate roof. The house is in two storeys with a five-bay front. The entrance is elliptical-headed with a fanlight, and the windows are sashes.	II
Sherdley Hall Farmhouse; 53.43402°N 2.73678°W	—	1671	The farmhouse is in stone with a slate roof, it is in two storeys with an attic, and has a three-bay front, the outer bays projecting under gables. The windows are mullioned.	II
Dean School Cottage; 53.46459°N 2.61614°W	—	1677	This originated as a school, and was later converted into a house. It is built in stone with a stone-slate roof, is in a single storey with an attic, and has a two-bay front. The windows are mullioned, those in the attics being in dormers. Above the entrance is an inscribed lintel.	II
St Helens Quaker Meeting House; 53.45176°N 2.73212°W		1679–92	The oldest Quaker meeting house in Lancashire still in use, it is built in stone with a stone-slate roof. The building is in two storeys, and has a two-bay front. The windows are mullioned, and above the entrance is a sundial dated 1753. In the east gabled end is a seven-light window, which also has a transom.	II
Fairbrother's Farmhouse; 53.45722°N 2.62477°W	—	1692	A house with rendered walls and a stone-slate roof. It is in two storeys and has a front of two gabled bays. The gables have decorative bargeboards, and the windows are casements.	II
Obelisk; 53.45294°N 2.64183°W		18th century	The obelisk stands in the centre of the market square in Earlestown. It was originally in Risley, and was moved to the churchyard of St Peter, Newton-le-Willows in 1819, and then to its present position in 1897. The obelisk is in granite, and stands on three octagonal steps and a plinth with a cornice.	II
Stocks; 53.45592°N 2.61475°W		18th century	The stocks stand outside St Peter's Church, Newton-le-Willows. They consist of two stone piers with shaped heads. The piers contain grooves holding wooden boards.	II
Bradley Lock; 53.44496°N 2.64372°W		c. 1756	The lock is on the disused Sankey Canal. It is built in stone, and the retaining walls are intact. Only the gates at the west end remain, and beyond them the canal has been filled in.	II
Old double lock Sankey Canal; 53.45956°N 2.70048°W		1758	The oldest British example of a staircase lock. It is in two levels, and is on the disused Sankey Canal. The lock is built in stone, the gates have been removed and it is now a cascade.	II
New double lock, Sankey Canal; 53.46039°N 2.72465°W		c. 1772	A staircase lock of two levels on the disused Sankey Canal. It is built partly in stone and partly in brick, with rounded stone copings. Only the upper gates remain.	II
Offices, Ravenhead Works; 53.44329°N 2.75453°W	—	c. 1773	This originated as a farmhouse with attached buildings, with were later used as offices. They are in brick with stone dressings and slate roofs. The former farmhouse is in three storeys and has a front of six bays with a bowed porch carried on Doric columns. To the left is a lower section in two storeys with a three-bay front. Further to the left the former stable is in three storeys with a three bay front. The top storey contains round windows above which is a pediment with another round window. On the roof is an octagonal cupola with Tuscan columns and round-arched openings.	II
Newton Park Farmhouse; 53.45003°N 2.60754°W	—	1774	The farmhouse is in brick with stone dressings and a slate roof. The original part is on a stone plinth, and is in three storeys with a five-bay front. The middle bay projects forward under a pediment, and the windows are sashes. There is a 19th-century extension to the left and a 20th-century extension to the right.	II
Archway, Randell's Nursery; 53.45823°N 2.62170°W		Late 18th century	Originally at Haydock Lodge, the archway was moved to its present site in 1840. It is in sandstone with a slate roof. The arch is round-headed with a Doric aedicule, and above it is a crest in the form of a lamb's head. The archway is flanked by five-bay wings, including a four-bay Doric colonnade. The windows in the outer bays are straight-headed; in the other four bays on the right they are round-headed with sashes, and on the left they are lunettes.	II*
Windmill tower 53.44273°N 2.75099°W	—	Late 18th century	The former windmill was altered in the 19th century and its lower part was surrounded by housing. The sails and machinery have been removed. The tower is circular and tapering, in brick with a flat roof. It is in three storeys with sash windows in the middle storey.	II
Nutgrove Hall; 53.43118°N 2.75949°W	—	1810	A Georgian house in brick on as stone base with stone dressings and a hipped slate roof. It is in two storeys, and has a front of five bays. The central doorway has a Doric porch with a frieze and a cornice. The windows are sashes with wedge lintels.	II
Le Chateau; 53.48151°N 2.66267°W		c. 1822	Originally part of the dower house to Garswood New Hall, it is in stuccoed brick with a slate roof, and is in one storey with a front of three bays. Along the top is a cornice, the left bay being taller than the others and also having a parapet. The entrance has a Tuscan aedicule. The windows are round-headed and mullioned, and above the window in the left bay is an inscribed rectangular plaque. To the right is a curved wall with a rusticated pier.	II
Seddon's Cottage; 53.43783°N 2.77615°W		Early 19th century	A stone house with a concrete-tile roof, it is in two storeys, and has a two-bay front. The windows are casements, and above the door is a plaque with a crest of a griffin's head. The house was the birthplace of R. J. Seddon prime minister of New Zealand (1893-1906).	II
Bourne's Tunnel; 53.42072°N 2.74898°W		Late 1820s	The tunnel was built to carry a colliery tramway under the Liverpool and Manchester Railway. It is constructed in sandstone, it is 104 feet (31.7 m) long, and is built partly on a skew and partly straight. The tunnel is horseshoe-shaped, and lined in stone. The south portal has rusticated voussoirs; the north portal is buried.	II
Newton Viaduct; 53.45308°N 2.61419°W		1828	The viaduct was designed by George Stephenson for the Liverpool and Manchester Railway to carry it over Mill Lane (A49 road) in Newton-le-Willows. It is built in brick with stone dressings, and consists of four round-headed arches with rusticated voussoirs. To the west is a tunnel with an elliptical arch over a stream.	II
Sankey Viaduct; 53.44740°N 2.65067°W		1828–30	The viaduct was designed by George Stephenson for the Liverpool and Manchester Railway to carry it over the Sankey Valley. It is built in brick with rusticated sandstone facing. The viaduct consists of nine round-headed arches on tapering piers.	I
Eccleston Hall; 53.44958°N 2.77340°W		c. 1829–34	A house designed by Samuel Taylor for his own use, later a hospital and after that converted into flats. It is built in sandstone and has a hipped Welsh slate roof. Apart from a single-storey rear wing containing a billiards room, the house is in two storeys. The entrance front is in three bays, and the sides are in five bays. The central bay of the entrance front contains flush Greek Doric columns and a first-floor balcony. The middle three bays of the south front are slightly bowed, and are flanked by four engaged Greek Doric columns. Most of the windows are sashes.	II
2 Lionel Street; 53.43340°N 2.69979°W	—	c. 1830	Originally a public house, later a private dwelling, it is in brick with stone dressings and a concrete tile roof. The house is in two storeys with a front of three bays. The central bay projects forward under a gable, and contains a pointed doorway containing a Tuscan doorcase with fluted columns and a blind fanlight. The windows are sashes with wedge lintels.	II
Railway bridge, Marshall's Cross Road; 53.42680°N 2.72476°W		c. 1830	The railway bridge, adjacent to Lea Green station, was designed by George Stephenson for the Liverpool and Manchester Railway. It is built in rusticated stone with a later iron parapet. The bridge consists of a single round arch with voussoirs, lateral pilasters and retaining walls.	II
Railway bridge, New Street; 53.42813°N 2.72017°W		c. 1830	The railway bridge was designed by George Stephenson for the Liverpool and Manchester Railway. It carries New Street over the railway, and is built in rusticated stone. The bridge consists of a single round arch with voussoirs, lateral pilasters and retaining walls.	II
Huskisson Memorial; 53.45412°N 2.60125°W		1831	The memorial is on the side of the Liverpool and Manchester Railway where William Huskisson was killed on its opening day. It is in the form of a painted stone Neoclassical pavilion that is open on the rail side. Inside is a replica of the original tablet on an aedicule decorated with wreathes, the original being in the National Railway Museum, York.	II
Home Farmhouse and barn 53.45180°N 2.76787°W	—	Early to mid 19th century	The building is in sandstone with a stone flagged roof, and is in Tudor style. The farmhouse is in two storeys, and has a front of three bays, the central bay projecting forward under a shaped gable. The windows are mullioned with casements. The central doorway has a Tudor arch with a rectangular fanlight above. The barn projects to the left and contains a porch, doorways and key-shaped ventilation holes.	II
URC Chapel; 53.45668°N 2.62575°W		1842	The chapel was originally Congregational and was designed by James Picton. It is built in stone with a slate roof. On the entrance front are a pair of porches, between which is a memorial behind iron railings. Above the memorial is rectangular window over which is a wheel window. Along the sides are five bays with tall windows with pointed heads. The building closed as a church in 2005.	II
Church of St Mary Immaculate; 53.46428°N 2.70379°W	—	1844–45	A Roman Catholic church designed by Weightman and Hadfield in Decorated style. It is built in stone with a slate roof, and consists of a nave without aisles, a chancel, a north vestry and a south chapel. There is also a narthex, which was added later, and a bellcote.	II
Newton-le-Willows railway station 53.45316°N 2.61371°W		1845	The station was built on the Liverpool and Manchester Railway, and is in brick with stone dressings and a slate roof. The station building is in two storeys, and has a front of six bays. The third bay has a porch with a parapet, and the fourth bay is gabled. The first three bays are recessed, and have a 20th-century canopy.	II
Earlestown railway station 53.45115°N 2.63758°W		c. 1845	The station was built on the Liverpool and Manchester Railway, and is in stone with a slate roof. It is in a single storey, and has a front of five bays, the outer bays being recessed, lower, and with a parapet. The chimney stacks have octagonal flues, concave sides, and moulded caps.	II
Grotto, Victoria Park; 53.46330°N 2.74394°W		c. 1840s	A folly built in industrial waste and glass with stone dressings. It is in a dilapidated state, and includes a battlemented tower and ruinous walls. The folly incorporates stones carved with images such as coats of arms, heraldry, birds, and grotesques.	II
St Nicholas' Church; 53.42827°N 2.72104°W		1847–49	The church was designed by Sharpe and Paley, with a west tower added in 1897 and a vestry in the 1960s. It is built in stone with a slate roof, and consists of a nave with a clerestory and aisles, a chancel with a south organ loft and a north vestry, a south porch, and a west tower with an embattled parapet.	II
Mansion House; 53.46278°N 2.74369°W		1850	A large house designed by Charles Reed in Italianate style, its grounds later becoming Victoria Park and the house converted into offices. It is stuccoed with hipped slate roofs, is in two storeys, and has a three-bay front, all the faces being symmetrical. Features include a tower with a low-pitched roof, and a central lantern above the staircase.	II
St Helens Junction railway station 53.43383°N 2.70020°W		1851	The station building is on the original Liverpool and Manchester Railway line, and is in Classical style. It consists of a long linear single-storey building in brick with sandstone dressings and a hipped Welsh slate roof. The roof overhangs on all sides forming a canopy that is supported by cast iron columns. There are two through walkways, and the building includes waiting rooms and offices.	II
Tank House, Crown Glass works 53.44963°N 2.73606°W		1855	The oldest remaining gas-fired continuous tank furnace in Europe, it is now part of the World of Glass Museum. The building has a rectangular plan, and is built in brick with a slate roof. Outside the building are buttresses, and in the south front is an entrance, windows with segmental heads, and a blocked round window in the gable. Inside are the remains of a flue system, and iron columns and beams supporting a massive chimney with an oval section that rises through the roof. The tank house is also a scheduled monument.	II*
Sutton Oak Welsh Chapel; 53.44029°N 2.70832°W		c. 1855	Originally Methodist, it has been a Welsh chapel since 1893. It is built in industrial waste, with stone dressings, a brick entrance front, and a slate roof. The entrance front has a round-headed doorway with an inset Tuscan doorcase, flanked by round-headed windows. The windows on the sides are flat-headed. Attached to the rear is a house that is included in the listing. It is in two storeys, and has sash windows.	II
Holy Trinity Church; 53.45327°N 2.72089°W		1857	The church was designed by W. and J. Hay, and the apse was added in 1883–84 by J. Gandy. It is built in industrial waste with sandstone dressings and has a slate roof. The church consists of a nave, a south porch, transepts and an apse. At the west end is a bellcote.	II
Bradley Swing Bridge; 53.44489°N 2.63967°W		c. 1857	The swing bridge crosses the Sankey Canal and is in iron, originally with timber decking, and later with tarmac. The turning gear is under the pivot end on the north side.	II
Former National Westminster Bank; 53.45299°N 2.73546°W		c. 1860	Originating as a branch of Parr's Bank, it was extended and remodelled in 1878, and has since been converted into a public house. The building is in partly in stone and partly in brick with stone dressings, and has a Welsh slate roof. It is in two storeys, and has a main front of ten bays. The windows are sashes with pointed heads. The main entrance has a gabled porch and a lintel carried on round piers with foliated capitals.	II
Church of the Holy Cross and St Helen; 53.45365°N 2.73204°W		1860–62	A Roman Catholic church designed by J. J. Scoles, built in stone with a slate roof. It consists of a nave and chancel in a single vessel, aisles, transepts, chapels, and a north porch. Inside are impressive reredoses, and an elaborate screen at the entrance to the Sacred Heart Chapel.	II
Church of St Mary and St John; 53.45611°N 2.63224°W		1864	A Roman Catholic church designed by Gilbert Blount, and completed in 1880 with a northwest steeple. It is built in stone with a slate roof, and consists of a nave with a clerestory, aisles, a steeple, and a canted chancel flanked by chapels. The west window is in the shape of a convex triangle and contains three cinquefoils.	II
Monument, URC Church; 53.45678°N 2.62608°W	—	1864	The monument is to Richard Evans, who left money for building a second church, now demolished. It consists of a polished red granite obelisk standing on four square steps.	II
St Peter's Church; 53.45403°N 2.70090°W		1864–65	The church was designed by J. Medland Taylor, it has walls of red and buff stone and copper slag, and a slate roof. The church consists of a nave, aisles, a double south transept, a canted chancel with a south vestry and north organ loft, and a steeple at the southwest corner.	II
St. John the Evangelist; 53.44117°N 2.75613°W		1869–70	The church was designed by J. Medland and H. Taylor, and is constructed in stone and industrial waste with stone dressings and roofs of slate. The church consists of a nave with a north porch, a chancel with a clerestory, a north chapel, and a south organ loft. At the junction of the nave and chancel is a bellcote.	II
Lodge, Victoria Park; 53.46147°N 2.74138°W	—	1877	The lodge is in Italianate style, and is stuccoed with a hipped slate roof. It has a square plane, is in a single storey, and has a front of three . At the entrance is a Doric porch with a frieze, and a dentil cornice. On the right side is a bow window.	II
Beecham's Clock Tower and Offices; 53.45308°N 2.74132°W		1884–87	Built as a factory and offices for Thomas Beecham and designed by H. V. Krolow and Harry May, the building is in brick with terracotta dressings and a Welsh slate roof. It has an L-shaped plan and is in three storeys. On the corner is a tower containing the entrance; it is in four stages, the top stage containing clock faces, and surmounted by a cupola. The building has been incorporated into St Helens College.	II
Bottle making shop 53.44757°N 2.73064°W		c. 1886	The bottle making shop was once part of Ravenhead Glass Works, and is now in a ruinous condition. It was built to contains a Siemen's tank furnace, and is constructed in brick with a slate roof. An oval cone protrudes through the roof. The ground on which the structure stands is a scheduled monument.	II
All Saints' Church; 53.43727°N 2.70335°W		1891–93	The church was designed by Paley, Austin and Paley. It is built in sandstone with concrete-tile roofs. The church consists of a nave with a clerestory, aisles, a southwest porch, transepts, and a chancel with a chapel and a vestry.	II
Earlestown Town Hall; 53.45300°N 2.64322°W		1892–93	The town hall was designed by Thomas Beesley. It is built in brick with stone dressings and slate roofs. The building is in two storeys with attics and a basement, and it has a V-shaped plan, with seven bays on each long front and three bays on the corner. There is a five-stage clock tower on the northeast corner. The windows are sashes, some of them being mullioned or mullioned and transomed. The gables on the main front and corner are shaped.	II
St Peter's Church; 53.45598°N 2.61442°W		1892–1901	The church was designed by Domaine and Brierley in free Perpendicular style with Arts and Crafts features. It is built in stone with slate roofs. The church consists of a nave and chancel in a single vessel, aisles under lean-to roofs, a south chapel, a north organ loft and vestries, and a large tower with north and south porches. The tower has an embattled parapet.	II
Gates, gate piers and walls 53.48294°N 2.66409°W		Late 19th to early 20th century	This was the west entrance to Garswood Park estate, and consists of a carriageway without gates with flanking piers. Outside these, on both sides, are pedestrian gates, further piers, and curving walls with end piers. The six piers and the walls are in sandstone. The piers are similar, in Baroque Revival style, they are 12 feet (3.7 m) high, and are highly decorated with large urns on their tops. The pedestrian gates are in wrought iron, and the railings on the walls are in cast iron.	II
South African War Memorial; 53.45298°N 2.64311°W		1904	A memorial to those who fought in the South African Wars and later conflicts. It consists of a statue of a soldier standing on a plinth with grey granite columns and red granite panels. Under this is a base in two stages containing panels. To the side of the memorials are later panels commemorating the First and Second World Wars.	II
Statue of Queen Victoria; 53.45418°N 2.73632°W		1905	The statue was designed by George Frampton and unveiled by the Earl of Derby. It consists of a bronze effigy of Queen Victoria on a sandstone pedestal and a granite base. The queen is sitting on a throne with a sceptre, and holding an orb. On the back of the throne is a statue of Saint George. The whole statue was moved to its present site in 2000.	II*
Cowley High School, South Block; 53.45905°N 2.74610°W		1911–12	The school was designed by Biram and Fletcher, and is built in brick with terracotta dressings and a hipped slate roof. The school has a modified U-shaped plan, and is in two storeys. The main range has a double pile plan, and is flanked by wings. On the roof is a wooden bellcote with a domed top and a finial.	II
Church of St Helen; 53.45162°N 2.73496°W		1920–26	The church stands in the centre of St Helens, and was designed by W. D. Caroe. It is built in brick with sandstone dressings and has a slate roof. The church consists of a nave and chancel in one vessel, aisles under lean-to roofs, a northeast tower and chapel, a south vestry, and a narthex at the west end. The furnishings were also designed by Caroe.	II
St Mary's Church, Lowe House; 53.45707°N 2.74009°W		1920–29	A Roman Catholic church designed by Charles B. Powell, with Gothic and Byzantine features. It is built in stone with slate roofs. The church consists of a nave, aisles, a west tower, transepts and a chancel with round apses, and an octagonal tower at the crossing surmounted by a dome. The windows are round-headed lancets.	II
Pair of telephone kiosks 53.45407°N 2.73534°W		1935	A pair of K6 type telephone kiosks flanking the steps of the town hall. They were designed by Giles Gilbert Scott, and are constructed in cast iron with a square plan and a dome. The kiosks have three unperforated crowns in the top panels.	II
Wheatsheaf including bowling green viewing terrace 53.42835°N 2.71095°W		1936–38	A public house designed by W. A. Hartley, in brown brick, partly rendered, with stone dressings and slate roofs. It is in a U-shaped plan, has two storeys, and is in brewer's Tudor style. At the rear is a parallelogram-shaped bowling green with a tiered viewing terrace, which is included in the listing. The interior has been little altered.	II
Reflection Court; 53.45032°N 2.74068°W		1937–40	Originally the offices of Pilkingtons, later converted into flats and business units, they were designed by Herbert J. Rowse and Kenneth Cheeseman in Modernist style. The building is in brick with concrete dressings and flat roofs, and has a horseshoe plan. It is mainly in two storeys with basements. Attached to the southwest corner is a Neo-Georgian block of 1924 designed by Arnold Thornely.	II
Former Pilkington's Headquarters; 53.44622°N 2.75756°W		1959–63	An administrative complex for Pilkington's designed by Edwin Maxwell Fry. The buildings are concrete-framed and clad in slate, glass, and brick, with aluminium sash windows. They all have flat roofs, and vary in height from one to thirteen storeys. The complex includes a tower block 170 feet (52 m) high, four other major blocks, and smaller structures. The interiors contain high-quality materials, and 20th-century artworks.	II
The Miner (The Anderton Mining Monument); 53.44769°N 2.73258°W		1964	A sculpture by Arthur Fleischmann for the National Coal Board. It consists of a column supporting the bust of a coal miner's head and shoulders, with arms raised and carrying a lump of coal. The column consists of a steel drum, the bust is in bronze, and the lump of coal is in fibreglass.	II
