= St Nicholas Church, St Helens =

Coordinates: 53.4282°N 2.7211°W

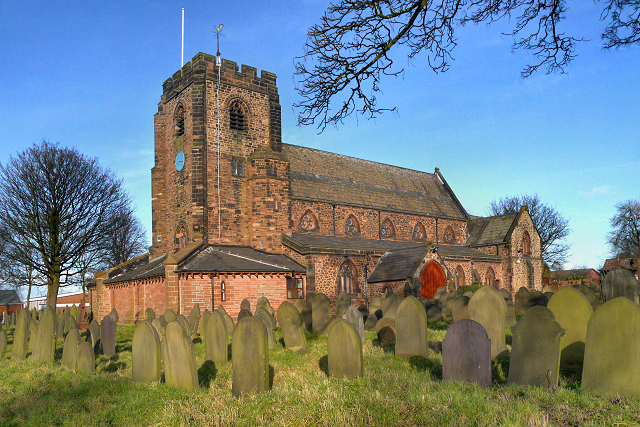

- Location in Merseyside
- OS grid reference: NZ 274,513
- Location: New Street, Sutton, St Helens, Merseyside
- Country: England
- Denomination: Anglican
- Website: St Nicholas, St Helens

History
- Status: Parish church
- Dedication: Saint Nicholas
- Consecrated: 4 June 1849

Architecture
- Functional status: Active
- Heritage designation: Grade II
- Designated: 23 August 1985
- Architect: Sharpe and Paley
- Architectural type: Church
- Style: Gothic Revival
- Groundbreaking: 1848
- Completed: 1960s
- Construction cost: Over £3,900 (equivalent to £430,000 in 2025)

Specifications
- Materials: Stone, slate roofs

Administration
- Province: York
- Diocese: Liverpool
- Archdeaconry: Warrington
- Deanery: Saint Helens
- Parish: Sutton

Clergy
- Rector: Revd Louise and Revd Simon Moore

St Nicholas Church is in New Street, Sutton, Merseyside, England. It is an active Anglican parish church in the deanery of Saint Helens, the Archdeaconry of Warrington and the diocese of Liverpool. Its benefice is combined with those of All Saints, Sutton, and St Michael and All Angels, Sutton. The church is recorded in the National Heritage List for England as a designated Grade II listed building.

== History ==
The church was built in 1847–49 and designed by the Lancaster architects Sharpe and Paley. Its total cost was over £3,900 (equivalent to £430,000 in 2025), to which King's College, Cambridge, patron of the church, contributed £1,270 in commemoration of the fourth centenary of its foundation. The church was consecrated on 4 June 1849 by Rt Revd John Graham, Bishop of Chester. The tower was added in 1897 and the vestry in the 1960s.

== Architecture ==
St Nicholas is built in stone rubble with slate roofs. It is in Geometric style. The plan consists of a five-bay nave with a clerestory, north and south aisles, a west tower, a three-bay chancel with a south organ loft, a north vestry, and a south porch. The tower has diagonal buttresses, a three-light west window, two-light louvred bell openings, and a stair turret. Around the summit is an embattled parapet. The chancel has gabled buttresses, and is surmounted by a parapet supported by corbels. The stained glass in the east window dates from 1879; it was designed by Henry Holiday and depicts Faith, Hope and Charity. Elsewhere is stained glass dating from the 1850s and 1890s.

== See also ==
- Listed buildings in St Helens, Merseyside
- List of works by Sharpe and Paley
