= Newfield Hall =

Building in North Yorkshire, England

Coordinates: 54.0190°N 2.1364°W

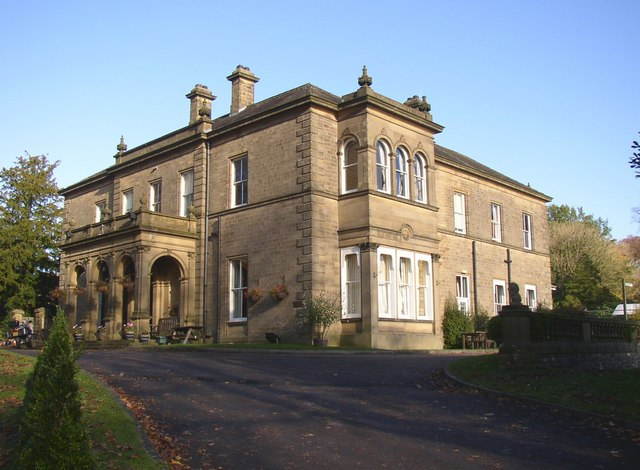
Newfield Hall

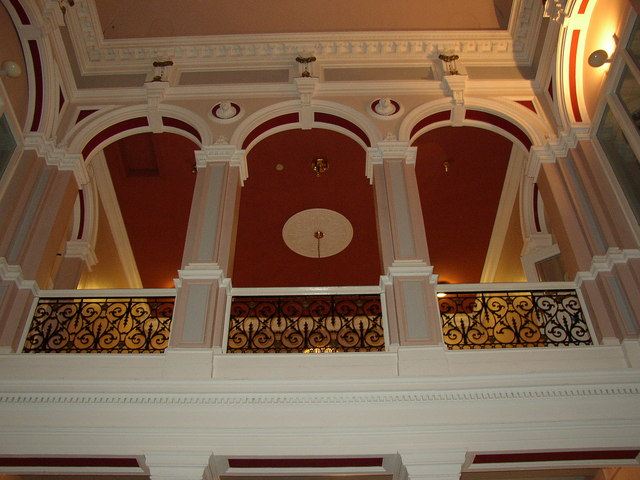
Interior

Newfield Hall is a former country house located 1 mile (1.6 km) to the southeast of the village of Airton, North Yorkshire, England. It is now a hotel.

== History ==
It was designed by the Lancaster architect E. G. Paley for William Nicholson Alcock at a cost of £36,000 (equivalent to £4,250,000 in 2023). Construction of the house started by at least 1855, and it was opened in 1856. Alcock was a lawyer who had moved to Gloucestershire by 1881.

The house and its estate were sold in 1890 to William Illingworth, a retired Bradford worsted manufacturer. It was sold again in 1901 to John William Morkill who became High Sheriff of Yorkshire in 1929–30 and a Deputy Lieutenant, and who wrote the standard local history of Malhamdale. During the 1930s the estate was broken up, the house being leased to the Holiday Fellowship, and the rest of the estate was sold to All Souls College, Oxford.

The house has since been used as a hotel administered by HF Holidays.

== See also ==
- List of works by Sharpe and Paley
