= All Saints' Church, St Helens =

Coordinates: 53.4373°N 2.7033°W

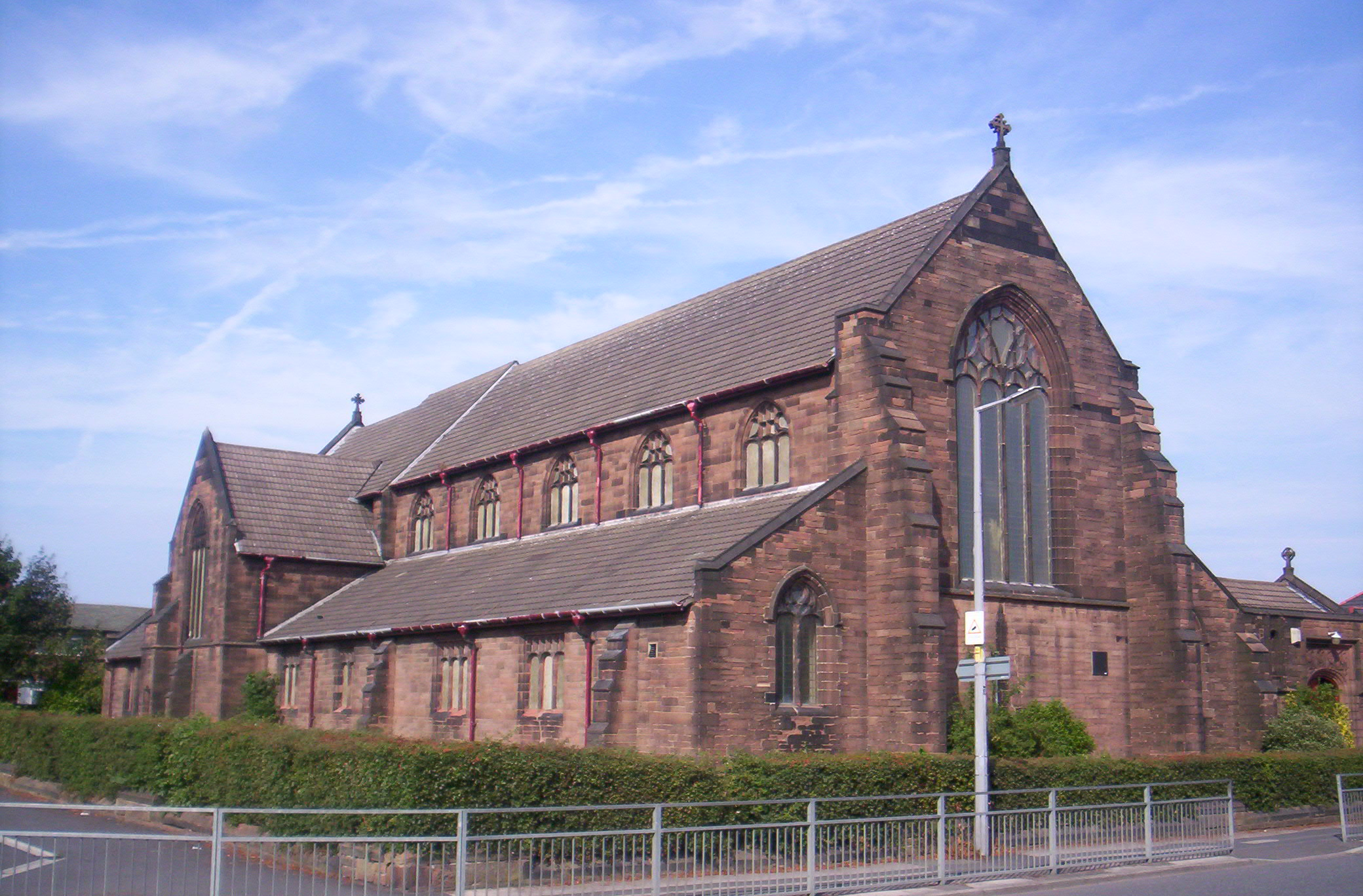
- All Saints' Church, St Helens, from the northwest

- Location in Merseyside
- OS grid reference: SJ 534,936
- Location: Ellamsbridge Road, Sutton, St Helens, Merseyside
- Country: England
- Denomination: Anglican
- Website: All Saints, Sutton

History
- Status: Parish church
- Founded: 4 August 1891
- Consecrated: 14 October 1893

Architecture
- Functional status: Active
- Heritage designation: Grade II
- Designated: 2 June 1988
- Architect: Paley, Austin and Paley
- Architectural type: Church
- Style: Gothic Revival
- Groundbreaking: 4 August 1891
- Completed: 1893

Specifications
- Materials: Sandstone, cement-tile roofs

Administration
- Province: Province of York
- Diocese: Liverpool
- Archdeaconry: Warrington
- Deanery: Saint Helens
- Parish: Sutton

Clergy
- Rector: Revds Louise and Simon Moore

All Saints' Church is in Ellamsbridge Road, Sutton, Merseyside, England. It is an active Anglican parish church in the deanery of Saint Helens, the archdeaconry of Warrington, and the diocese of Liverpool. Its benefice is united with those of St Nicholas, Sutton, and St Michael and All Angels, Sutton, to form the Sutton Team. The church is recorded in the National Heritage List for England as a designated Grade II listed building.

== History ==
All Saints was built between 1891 and 1893, and designed by the Lancaster firm of architects, Paley, Austin and Paley. The land and a donation of £1,000 (equivalent to £110,000 in 2025) were given by the lord of the manor, William Pilkington of the Pilkington glass manufacturing firm. The foundation stone was laid by Pilkington's daughter on 4 August 1891, and the church was consecrated on 14 October 1893 by the Rt Revd John Ryle, Bishop of Liverpool. The architects planned for a tower on the crossing, but this was never built. The estimated final cost of the church was £6,800, and it provided seating for 600 people.

== Architecture ==
=== Exterior ===
The church is constructed in red sandstone, and has cement-tile roofs. Its plan is cruciform, and consists of a five-bay nave with a clerestory, north and south aisles, a southwest porch, north and south transepts, and a two-bay chancel with a chapel and a vestry. The architectural style is Gothic Revival. The windows in the aisles and clerestory have three lights, and those in the chapel and vestry have two lights. At the west end are buttresses and a four-light window. The east window has five lights and contains staggered transoms.

=== Interior ===
The authors of the Buildings of England series describe the interior as being "impressive" and "dignified". The arcades are carried on octagonal piers with moulded capitals. The piers at the crossing are massive, having been built in preparation for the unbuilt tower. At the west end of the church, two bays have been converted into a parish room, with a glazed screen between it and the rest of the church. The stained glass in the east window is a memorial to the Pilkington family; it was made in 1905 by Shrigley and Hunt. The organ dates from 1900 and was given by William Pilkington. Following a localised fire in the sanctuary area of the church in September 2020, the church is undergoing extensive cleaning and restoration with the plan for it to reopen in the early summer of 2021. The present congregation worship in nearby St Nicholas Church on Sundays at noon.

== See also ==
- Listed buildings in St Helens, Merseyside
- List of works by Paley, Austin and Paley
