= St Thomas' Church, Coventry =

Church building in Coventry, England

Coordinates: 52°24′18″N 1°31′22″W

St Thomas' Church was in Albany Road, Coventry, West Midlands, England. It is recorded in the National Heritage List for England as a designated Grade II listed building, but by 1973 was no longer in ecclesiastical use.

== History ==
The church was designed by the Lancaster architects Sharpe and Paley, and was built in 1848–49. The foundation stone was laid on 2 March 1848, and the church was consecrated on 7 August 1849 by the Bishop of Coventry. The cost of the building was £3,721 (equivalent to £490,000 in 2023). Towards this cost, £630 was given by the Coventry Archidiaconal Society, £230 by the Church Building Commissioners, and £230 by the Incorporated Church Building Society. The stone for the church was provided by Lord Leigh from a quarry on his estate at Stoneleigh Abbey. The church was declared redundant in 1974 and demolished in 1976.

== Architecture ==
The architectural style of the church was Decorated. Its plan consisted of a five-bay nave with a clerestory, north and south aisles, a three-bay chancel with vestries, a north porch, and a northwest bell turret. The bell turret was octagonal, surmounted by a cross, and decorated with crocket-like round ornaments. The east window had three main lights, the windows along the sides of the aisles, two lights, and the west window, four lights above which were two quatrefoils and a large sexfoil. There were five windows on each side of the clerestory. Inside the church the open timber roof of the nave was supported by corbels in the form of angels carrying shields.

== See also ==
- List of works by Sharpe and Paley
