= Royal Lancashire Show =

Annual agricultural show in England

Royal Lancashire Show logo

The Royal Lancashire Show (RLS) is an agricultural show which takes place every year at different locations throughout the historical county boundaries of Lancashire in Northern England. The show is organised by the Royal Lancashire Agricultural Society (RLAS) and is one of Britain's oldest agricultural shows, first taking place in 1767. It is a three-day event.

== History ==
The show began after a meeting to organise an agricultural society for Eastern District of Lancashire in 1767. The meeting, involving influential land-owners Wilbraham Egerton, of Tatton Park, Edward Stanton, the Earl of Derby, and Francis Egerton, the Duke of Bridgewater, took place in Salford. This society eventually combined with societies for North Lancashire and Manchester, at the suggestion of the Earl of Derby, to form the Royal Lancashire Agricultural Society. The show was intended to cater to farm owners, tenant farmers and labourers, to include animal exhibitions and prizes, and to enable the demonstration of new equipment.

It was agreed in the beginning that the show would move from site to site each year rather than favour one location. The show did settle at Stanley Park in Blackpool for some years in the 1950s until the mid-70s, and since 2017 has been dedicated to Salesbury Hall at Ribchester. The show was cancelled in 2008 due to poor weather, which resulted in financial problems for several years. The show did not resume regularly until 2015, but then was cancelled again in 2020 due to the COVID-19 pandemic. The show is, as of 2024, a three-day event, attended by tens of thousands of people.

Colin Mustoe MBE is the chairman of the show since 2017.

== Timeline ==
- 1767: Formation of the Royal Lancashire Agricultural Society.
- 1954: From this year the show was at Stanley Park, Blackpool for many years.
- 1972: Blackpool Zoo opened, taking up a large part of Stanley Park, thus the show had to move. The Royal Lancashire Agricultural Show bought land at Ribby Hall, near Kirkham.
- 1979: Shortage of money forced the society to cease all activities for some years.
- Later: At various sites in Lancashire, including Witton Park, Blackburn.
- Later: for many years at Astley Park, Chorley, Lancashire.
- 2003 to 2007: On land at Salesbury Hall Farm near Ribchester.
  - 2006: Hot dry weather gave the show a good profit.
  - 2007: Weeks of heavy rain waterlogged the ground and forced cancellation.
- 2008: Planned to be at Myerscough near Preston Friday 18 to Sunday 20 July; heavy rain on 16 July night turned the ground into a mudbath and forced the show organizers to keep the public out on 18 July, but the animal classes on that day were judged. Further rain forced cancellation for 19 and 20 July. These two cancellations cost the society over £550,000.
- 2009: No show. The Society abandoned the Myerscough site, as it waterlogged easily in wet weather. The show was planned for Duke of Lancaster Park at Bilsborrow, but was cancelled as there was not enough time to rearrange the show, and lack of funds due to the 2008 cancellation.
- 2010: No show.
- 2011: No show.
- 2012: Held in May in Witton Park, Blackburn in good weather.
- 2013: No show.
- 2014: No show.
- 2015: Held on 7–9 August in good weather at Salesbury Hall near Ribchester, alongside the River Ribble.
- 2016: Held at Witton Park, Blackburn on 12–14 August.
- 2017: Held at Salesbury Hall, Ribchester, 11–13 August.
- 2018: Held on 20–22 July at Salesbury Hall.
- 2020: Cancelled due the COVID-19 pandemic.
- 2021, 2022, 2023: Held in July at Salesbury Hall.
