= St Nicholas Church, Wrea Green =

Coordinates: 53.7773°N 2.9155°W

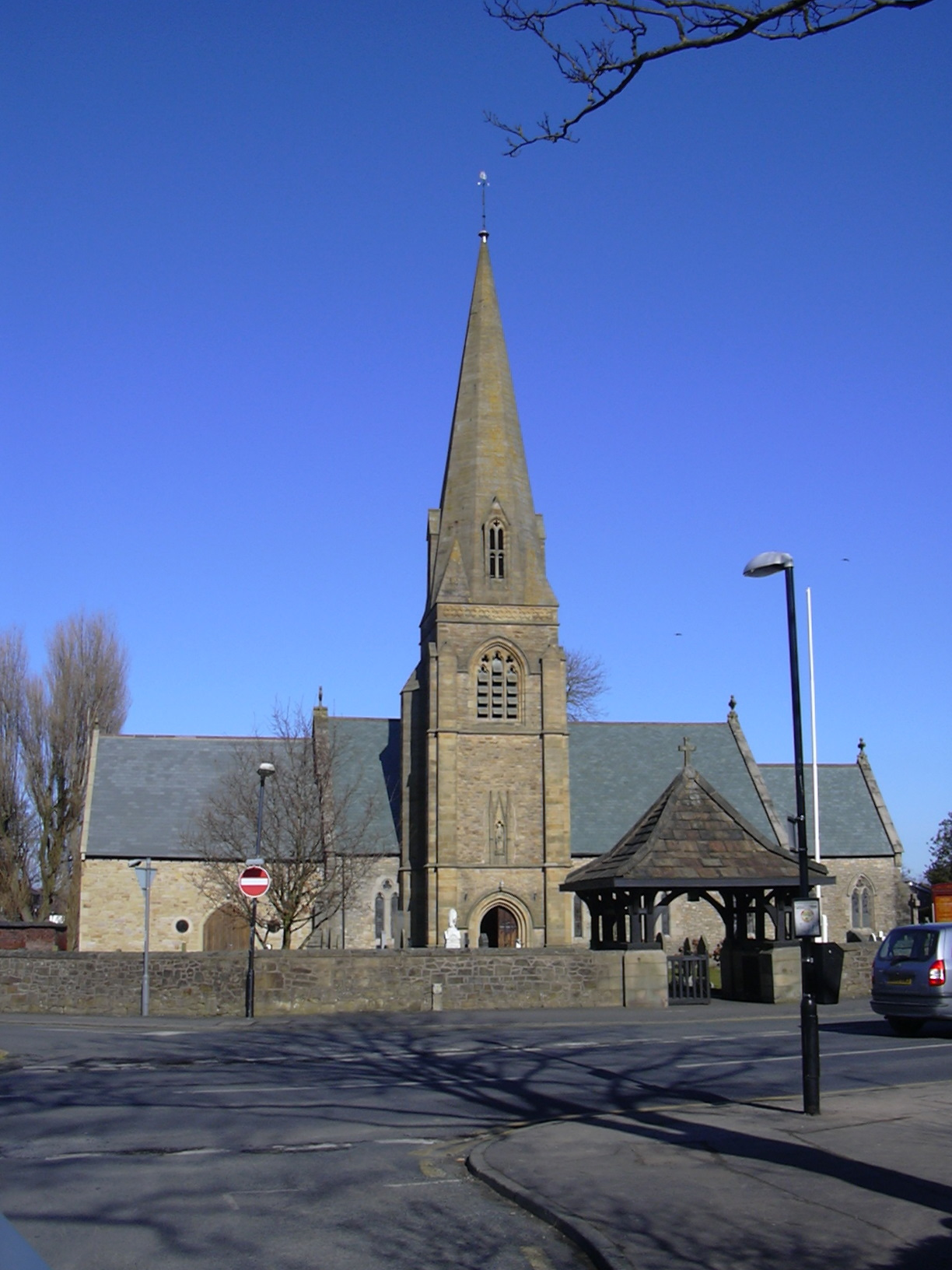
- St Nicholas Church from the south

- Location in the Borough of Fylde
- OS grid reference: SD 39763 31603
- Location: Wrea Green, Lancashire
- Country: England
- Denomination: Anglican
- Website: Official website; St Nicholas, Wrea Green

History
- Status: Parish church
- Dedication: Saint Nicholas

Architecture
- Functional status: Active
- Heritage designation: Grade II
- Designated: 11 June 1986
- Architects: Sharpe and Paley, Paley and Austin
- Architectural type: Church
- Style: Gothic Revival
- Groundbreaking: (original church 1721); 1848
- Completed: 1884

Administration
- Province: York
- Diocese: Blackburn
- Archdeaconry: Lancaster
- Deanery: Kirkham
- Parish: Ribby cum Wrea; St Nicholas

Clergy
- Priest: Rev R. W. Marks

St Nicholas Church is in the village of Wrea Green, Lancashire, England. It is an active Anglican parish church in the deanery of Kirkham, the archdeaconry of Lancaster and the diocese of Blackburn. Its benefice is combined with those of St Matthew, Ballam and St Michael, Weeton. The church is recorded in the National Heritage List for England as a designated Grade II listed building.

== History ==
In 1721 the trustees of Nicolas Sharples' charity bought a plot of ground in the village from a Jane Whiteside and erected on it a small chapel, paid for by funds they had raised amongst themselves. The church was licensed for services in 1722 and was consecrated by the Bishop of Chester on 20 June 1755. In 1846 an order in council added to the township of Ribby with Wrea the township of Westby (without the two Plumptons) and formed them into the new parish of Ribby with Wrea, making it a perpetual curacy. In 1869 it became a titular vicarage. The small chapel was pulled down and on 13 May 1848 the new vicar, G L Parsons, laid the foundation stone for the present structure.

The church was rebuilt in 1848–49 by the Lancaster architects Sharpe and Paley at a cost of about £1,600 (equivalent to £180,000 as of 2025). It opened on 23 September 1849 but was not consecrated until 4 May 1855. In 1857 the pulpit, organ chamber, vestry, and stalls were added, but the architect responsible for this is not known. The steeple was added in 1884 by the successors in the same practice, Paley and Austin at a cost of £1,300. In 1931–32 Henry Paley of the same practice, now called Austin and Paley, added a marble floor to the chancel, new steps, and new choir seats. An extension at west end of the church, completed in 2007, provided the village with a fully-equipped community centre.

== Architecture ==
=== Exterior ===
St Nicholas Church is constructed in sandstone rubble and has blue slate roofs. Its architectural style is Early English. The plan consists of a four-bay nave, with a tower attached to its south side, and a chancel with two short bays. The tower is in three stages and has a south doorway and a polygonal stair turret at its northwest corner. The middle stage houses a gabled niche containing a statue, and in the top stage are three-light louvered bell openings. On the tower is a broach spire with a two-light lucarne on each cardinal side. The windows in each bay of the nave consist of a pair of lancet windows with a circular window at the top. In the chancel is a three-light east window containing Geometrical tracery, and two double lancets on the south side. The west window consists of a double lancet above which is a sexfoil rose window.

=== Interior ===
Inside the church is a carved and gilded reredos and a stone pulpit. The east window contains stained glass by Shrigley and Hunt. The two-manual pipe organ was made in 1988 by Sixsmith, replacing an earlier organ by T. and C. Lane dating from about 1880.

== See also ==
- Listed buildings in Ribby-with-Wrea
- List of works by Sharpe and Paley
- List of ecclesiastical works by Paley and Austin
- List of ecclesiastical works by Austin and Paley (1916–44)
