= Ribby-with-Wrea =

- Civil parish
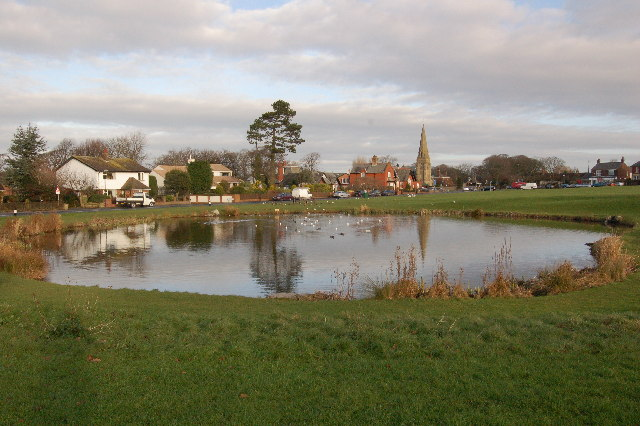
- The Dub at Wrea Green

- Shown within Fylde Borough Shown on the Fylde Shown within Lancashire
- Coordinates: 53.775°N 2.919°W
- Country: England
- Primary council: Fylde
- County: Lancashire
- Region: North West
- Status: Parish
- Main settlements: Ribby, Wrea Green

Government
  - UK Parliament: Fylde

Population (2011)
  - Total: 1,373
- Website: www.ribbywithwreaparishcouncil.co.uk

Ribby-with-Wrea is a civil parish just west of Kirkham, in the Borough of Fylde and ceremonial county of Lancashire, England. It had a population of 1,489 in 2001, reducing to 1,373 at the 2011 Census. The parish includes Ribby Hall and the village of Wrea Green.

For local government purposes, the parish forms part of Wrea Green with Westby ward. For Westminster elections it is part of the Fylde constituency.

== Ribby Hall ==
Joseph Hornby, a Kirkham merchant, bought Ribby manor in the north-east of the parish from his uncle Richard Hornby, and built a mansion called Ribby Hall in the 1790s. The stuccoed two-storey house has three full-height semicircular bay windows; its north (entrance) front and east (garden) front have seven bays, and a further three-bay wing completes the U-shaped plan. There are various later extensions to the west. The house was designated as Grade II listed in 1967. The grounds have mature woodland and an ornamental pond.

William Duckworth leased the house from the Hornby family in 1904, then bought the house and grounds in 1916. Profits from his Manchester company Duckworth & Co. (maker of supplies for food and drink manufacturers) enabled him to refurbish the house and redesign the gardens. After the Duckworth family left the property, the hall was used by a school for the deaf until 1969, and for much of the 1970s the grounds were the home of the Royal Lancashire Show. The house was divided into flats in 1982.

The 100-acre (40 ha) site was then used as a caravan park until it was bought in a derelict state by the Harrison family in 1994. Planning permission was granted for 175 cottages, 350 holiday homes and a hotel, and the site – known as Ribby Hall Village – has been further developed, adding holiday lodges and a second hotel with a health club. In 2019, the site employed 600 people.

== See also ==
- Listed buildings in Ribby-with-Wrea
