= St Helens Minster =

Coordinates: 53.4516°N 2.7350°W

- The Church of St Helen, St Helens
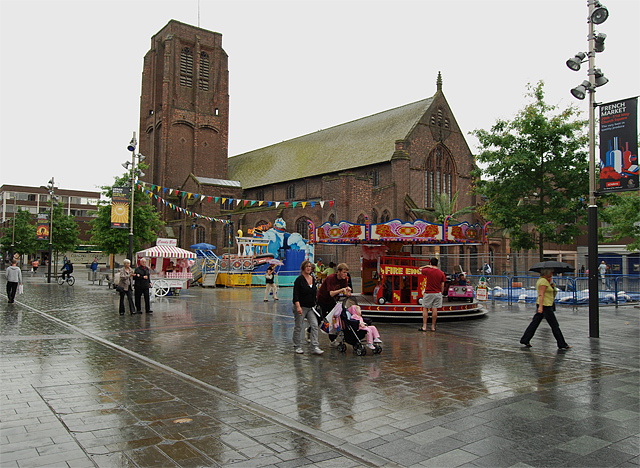
- St Helens Minster from Church Square

- Location in Merseyside
- OS grid reference: SJ 513 953
- Location: Church Street, St Helens, Merseyside
- Country: England
- Denomination: Anglican
- Churchmanship: Charismatic Evangelical
- Website: http://sthelensparishchurch.org/

History
- Status: Parish church
- Dedication: Saint Helen

Architecture
- Functional status: Active
- Heritage designation: Grade II
- Designated: 11 September 1951
- Architect: W. D. Caroe
- Architectural type: Church
- Style: Gothic Revival
- Groundbreaking: 1920
- Completed: 1926

Administration
- Province: York
- Diocese: Liverpool
- Archdeaconry: Warrington
- Deanery: Saint Helens
- Parish: St Helens

Clergy
- Vicar: Rachel Shuttleworth

St Helens Minster, formerly known as the Church of St Helen, (Note: Still officially known as such) is an Anglican church located in, St Helens, Merseyside, England. A chapel has been on the site since at least the 16th century. The chapel was doubled in size in 1816, but burnt down in 1916. The present church was designed by W. D. Caröe, and was built between 1920 and 1926. It is the parish church of the town, and stands in a prominent position. The church is recorded in the National Heritage List for England as a designated Grade II listed building. It is an active parish church in the diocese of Liverpool.

== History ==
The original place of worship in the settlement that grew to become the town of St Helens was a chapel dedicated to Saint Helen, and it is first recorded in 1552. The town was named after the chapel. By the early 19th century the chapel had become too small for its congregation and in 1816 it was agreed to extend it. The chapel was doubled in size at a cost of £2,094, and when it was reconsecrated, its dedication was changed to St Mary. This church burnt down in 1916 and a new church was designed by W. D. Caröe. This was built on the same site as the previous church between 1920 and 1926, and its dedication was changed back to St Helen. In 1994 a screen was inserted at the west end of the church, separating the narthex from the body of the church, and incorporating offices.

== Architecture ==
=== Exterior ===
The church is constructed in brick with red sandstone dressings, and it has a slate roof. Its design includes Decorated and Perpendicular architectural features. The church consists of a nave and a chancel with a clerestory in one vessel, north and south aisles under lean-to roofs, a northeast tower with a chapel, and a south vestry. At the west end is a narthex, in the centre of which are four entrances with pointed heads, and over these are panels containing quatrefoils. Flanking the entrances are flying buttresses, then there are low passages linking them to square embattled turrets at the corners of the church. The west window has five lights containing Perpendicular tracery. Along the sides of the aisles are canted buttresses and three-light Perpendicular windows, and the windows in the clerestory also have three lights. The east end of the chancel is canted and contains three windows. The tower has diagonal buttresses at the corners, and smaller buttresses on the sides. The bell openings are paired, and each has two lights and straight heads. At the top of the tower is a plain parapet, and on the southeast side is a stair turret that rises higher than the tower. To the west of the tower is a chapel and to the east is a porch and a transept.

=== Interior ===
Inside the church are five-bay arcades with four-centred arches carried on narrow moulded piers, above which are blind arcades framing the clerestory windows. Outside these arcades are lower arcades forming separate passages. There are more arcades, one is between the chancel and the north chapel, and the other between the chancel and the south vestry. Above these is an organ left on the north, and a minstrels' gallery on the south. In the chancel is a sedilia.

The furnishings were also designed by Caröe. The main reredos is wooden and contains 25 statues in niches; there is another reredos in the chapel. The font has a large ornate cover, and also in the church is the font from the previous church, which is dated 1731. The pulpit stands on small legs, it is decorated with lozenges, and above it is a tester. The parclose screens and choir stalls are intricately carved, but the pews have simpler designs. The organ case is also detailed, and is in Renaissance style.

In the south aisle is a large stone plaque dated 1670 that was removed from a schoolhouse. The stained glass in the east window is crowded with figures, and depicts the Te Deum. In the chapel is a window dated 1927 that was designed as a First World War memorial by Horace Wilkinson. The three-manual pipe organ was built in 1928 by Harrison and Harrison. It was renovated by Rushworth and Dreaper in 1972, and extended in 1994 by David Wells. There is a ring of ten bells cast in 1830 and 1839 by Thomas Mears II of the Whitechapel Bell Foundry, the tenor weighing 2,545 pounds (1,154 kg).

== Appraisal ==
On 11 September 1951 the church was designated as a Grade II listed building. Grade II is the lowest of the three grades of listing, and is applied to buildings that are "nationally important and of special interest". In the Buildings of England series, the architectural historians Pollard and Pevsner draw attention to the church's position as "the focal point of the town and a prominent landmark". They describe the interior as being "spatially masterful, and subtle everywhere and in every detail".

== Present day ==
It is an active Anglican parish church in the deanery of Saint Helens, the archdeaconry of Warrington, and the diocese of Liverpool. It is part of Church St Helens, a group of 11 Anglican Churches in the town working together. The church holds regular services on Sundays, and during the week it arranges activities for children, and other events.

The church was redesignated as a minster on 24 May 2026, and renamed accordingly.

== See also ==
- Listed buildings in St Helens, Merseyside
