= St Walburga's Convent, Lancaster =

Convent in Lancaster, Lancashire, England

Coordinates: 54.04673°N 2.7934°W

St Walburga's Convent stands to the north of Balmoral Road, Lancaster, in Lancashire, England. It was built in 1851–53, and designed by the local architect E. G. Paley. The building is connected to the convent chapel of Lancaster Cathedral by an L-shaped corridor. It pre-dates the cathedral, and was the earliest structure to be built on the cathedral complex. The convent is constructed in sandstone rubble with ashlar dressings, and has a slate roof. Its architectural style is Gothic Revival. The building has an L-shaped plan and is in two storeys. It is recorded in the National Heritage List for England as a designated Grade II listed building.

== See also ==
- List of works by Sharpe and Paley
