= Listed buildings in Ribby-with-Wrea =

Ribby-with-Wrea is a civil parish in the Borough of Fylde, Lancashire, England. It contains four buildings that are recorded in the National Heritage List for England as designated listed buildings, all of which are listed at Grade II. This grade is the lowest of the three gradings given to listed buildings and is applied to "buildings of national importance and special interest". The parish includes the village of Wrea Green but is otherwise mainly rural. The listed buildings are a former farmhouse, a country house, a 19th-century house, and a church.

== Buildings ==
Name and location	Photograph	Date	Notes
Hawthorn House; 53.77753°N 2.91300°W	—	Early 18th century	A former farmhouse, stuccoed with a slate roof. it has two storeys and a three-bay front. The doorway has flanking Tuscan columns, a cornice, and an elliptical fanlight. The windows are sashes.
Ribby Hall; 53.78008°N 2.89542°W	—	1790s	A country house later converted into flats. It is stuccoed and has hipped slate roofs, and is in two storeys. The house has an extended U-shaped plan, with a main front of seven bays. In the entrance front is a porch with four Tuscan columns, and around the house are three full-height semicircular bay windows. The windows are sashes, and at the rear is a Venetian-shaped stair window.
Church Grove House; 53.77740°N 2.91510°W	—	Early 19th century	A brick house with stone dressings and a pyramidal slate roof. It has two storeys and a square plan with a symmetrical three-bay front. At the front is a Tuscan doorcase with a cornice and a segmental fanlight. The windows are sashes, with a blind window above the doorway.
St Nicholas' Church; 53.77729°N 2.91558°W		1848–49	The church was designed by Sharpe and Paley in Early English style, and the steeple was added in 1884 by Paley and Austin. It is built in sandstone with a slate roof, and consists of a nave, a chancel, and a south steeple. The steeple has a three-stage tower with porch doorway, a stair turret and a niche containing a statue, and is surmounted by a broach spire with lucarnes.
