= Windermere House, Lancaster =

Windermere House
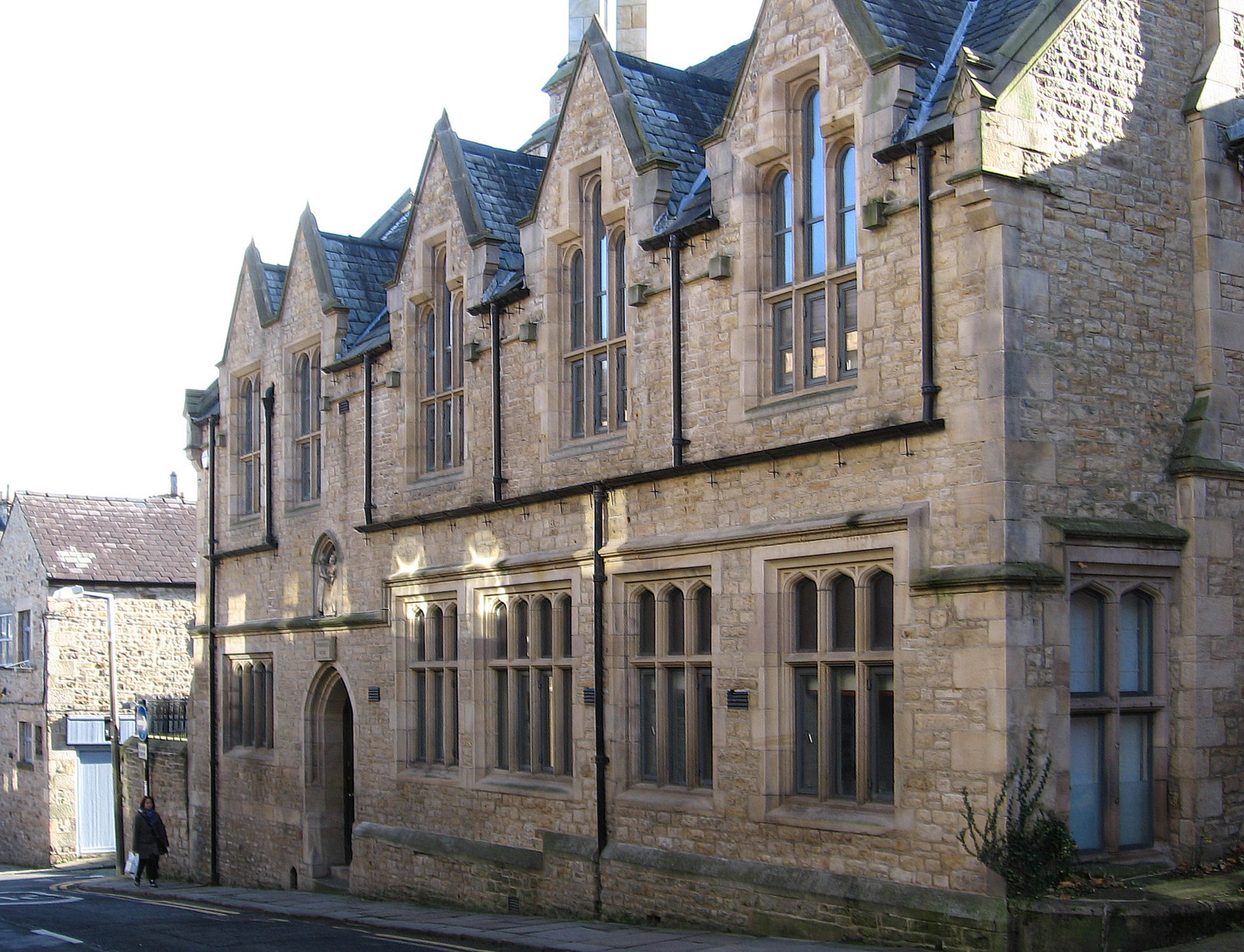
- Windermere House

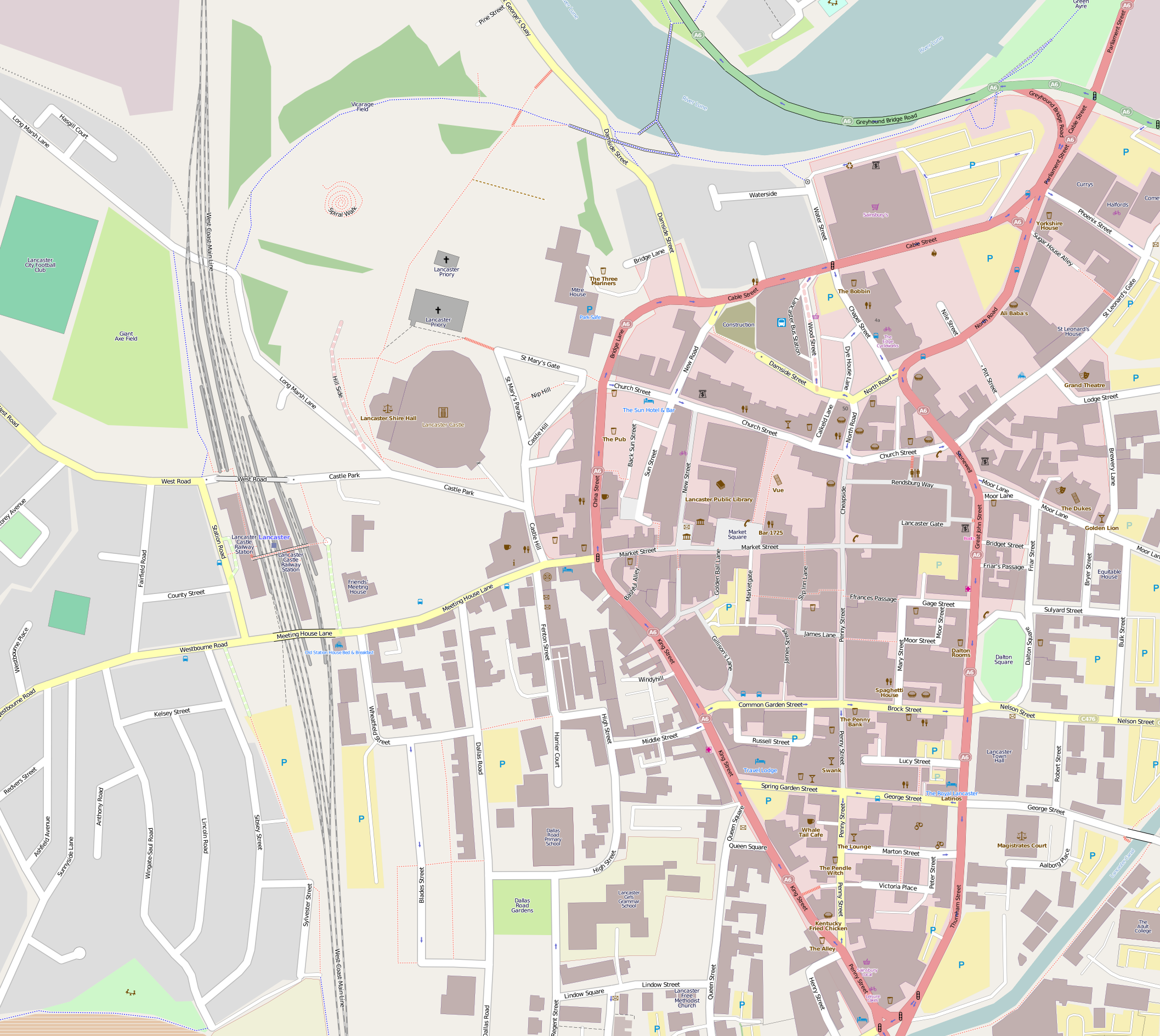
- Location in Lancaster
- 54.0471°N 2.8026°W
- Location: Middle Street, Lancaster, Lancashire, England
- OS grid reference: SD 476 615

History
- Built: 1849–50

Site notes
- Architect: Sharpe and Paley
- Architectural style: Elizabethan Revival

Listed Building – Grade II
- Designated: 11 June 1990
- Reference no.: 1298364

Windermere House is in Middle Street, Lancaster, Lancashire, England. It is recorded in the National Heritage List for England as a designated Grade II listed building. It originated as a school, and has since been converted into flats.

== History ==
This was originally the site of a Bluecoat school built in 1772. In 1849–50 it was rebuilt and enlarged by the local architects Sharpe and Paley. It then became known as the Lancaster Charity School for Girls. It was paid for mainly by public subscription, but the Sharpe family contributed £25 (equivalent to £3,000 in 2025) towards it. The school has since been converted into flats and is known as Windermere House.

== Architecture ==
The building is constructed in sandstone with slate roofs. The architectural style is Elizabethan Revival. The plan is rectangular, with a small service wing to the rear. The building is in two storeys, with a front of five slightly irregular bays. Each of the bays contains a gabled dormer. The entrance doorway is in the second bay from the left. Above it is a niche containing the figures of two girls holding an inscription. The windows are mullioned or mullioned and transomed, those in the upper storey having stepped heads.

== See also ==
- Listed buildings in Lancaster, Lancashire
- List of works by Sharpe and Paley
