= The Wheatsheaf, Camberley =

- Location within Surrey
- 51°19′47″N 0°42′06″W
- Type: Public house
- Location: 21 Heather Ridge Arcade, Camberley, GU15 1AX, Surrey

History
- Built: 1971

Site notes
- Architect(s): John and Sylvia Reid

Listed Building – Grade II
- Official name: The Wheatsheaf, Camberley
- Designated: 27 April 2018
- Reference no.: 1454715

The Wheatsheaf is a grade II listed public house in Heatherside, Camberley, Surrey. It was designed by John and Sylvia Reid and opened in 1971. It has a distinctive ratchet-wheel design and connects to the local shopping precinct.

== History ==
Goldney arms: Party per pale gules and azure, on a bend engrailed plain cotised argent, between two eagles displayed of the last, three garbs sable, banded or

The pub was designed by mass-market furniture designers John and Sylvia Reid, who were interested in experimental pub designs, and opened in May 1971 as part of a new housing estate. It was named after the wheatsheaf on the crest of Sir Henry Goldney whose family had connections with Camberley and previously owned the land before the estate was built. The original owners were First Eleven Limited, a London-based leisure business.

== Architecture ==
The pub was designed by the Reids in response to changing social changes following World War II, where segregated bars in pubs were becoming rejected and unfashionable. It has a distinctive ratchet-wheel design covering a single-space bar area, and connects to the local shopping precinct. The interior features various triangular segments called "snugs" or "lounges" overlooking a central circular seating area with a central chimney. It was redesigned in 1989 to include additional space and a function room in what was previously a storage area.

It was listed grade II by Historic England in 2018.
