= Furness Abbey Hotel =

Pub and former hotel in Barrow-in-Furness, Cumbria, England

Coordinates: 54.1375°N 3.1985°W

Photograph of the Furness Abbey Hotel, circa. 1850-1870

The Furness Abbey Hotel was demolished in 1953, having been bombed in May 1941. Its site now forms the car park to Furness Abbey and the museum. The station at Furness Abbey also suffered bomb damage and was demolished in the early 1950s. The original station booking office and refreshment room, built in 1862, which had been attached to the hotel, survives as The Abbey Tavern, standing in Abbey Approach, Barrow-in-Furness, Cumbria, England, to the north of the remains of Furness Abbey. The current structure is recorded in the National Heritage List for England as a designated Grade II listed building.

== History ==
In the 17th century the whole site included the manor house for the Preston family, and probably incorporated the guest house of Furness Abbey. By the 19th century, having gone through several ownerships after the Preston family had departed, the manor house was empty and semi-derelict until it was purchased by the Furness Railway in 1847. The Lancaster architects Sharpe and Paley converted the ruined manor house into a hotel to accommodate visitors to the Abbey. This contained 36 bedrooms and "only three bathrooms". The public rooms included an entrance hall and a reading/sitting room -both with stained glass windows, a billiard room and a ballroom. The hotel was extended as part of an integrated plan in the 1860s by E. G. Paley, to link it to the newly built Furness Abbey railway station. In 1953–54 the main hotel building was demolished, leaving the northern wing of Paley's overall design, subsequently to become the Tavern.

== Architecture and assessment ==
The existing building, in two and three storeys, is constructed in red sandstone with slate roofs. Listing information and several architectural references conflate the origins of the Abbey Tavern and the wider site -viz: it "represents a fragment of a substantial hotel (sic) that served the Furness Railway"; Matthew Hyde and Nikolaus Pevsner comment that "it is a pity no more is left of so tantalising a building". The Booking Office/ Refreshment Room -later to become the Abbey Tavern- was physically linked to the Furness Abbey Hotel, but had a separate and distinctive railway function. With the hotel which had been built a little earlier, the building utilised stone detail salvaged from the Preston manor house, which likewise had been largely built from re-used stone taken from Furness Abbey after its dissolution. The incorporation of original medieval fragments within a mid-Victorian interpretation of medievalism has sometimes led to the mistaken inference that the Abbey Tavern building itself had been part of the hotel or even 'part of the original manor house'.
