= Wrea Green =

Village in Lancashire, England

Coordinates: 53.776°N 2.914°W

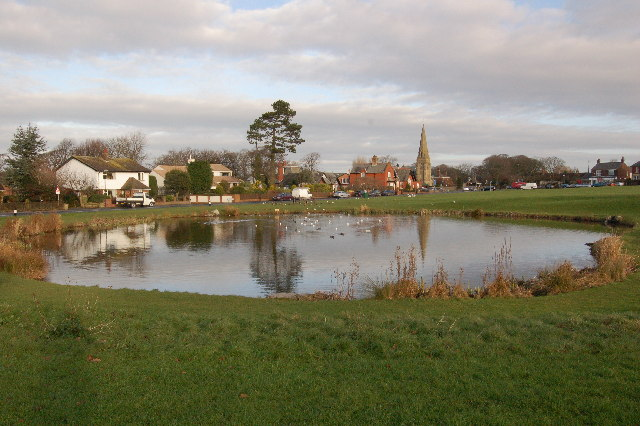
- The duck pond - 'The Dub'

- Shown within Fylde Borough Shown within the Fylde Location within Lancashire
- OS grid reference: SD397315
- Civil parish: Ribby-with-Wrea
- District: Fylde
- Shire county: Lancashire
- Region: North West
- Country: England
- Sovereign state: United Kingdom
- Post town: PRESTON
- Postcode district: PR4 2
- Dialling code: 01772
- Police: Lancashire
- Fire: Lancashire
- Ambulance: North West
- UK Parliament: Fylde

Wrea Green is a village in the Fylde borough of Lancashire, England. It lies about 2 miles (3.2 km) west of Kirkham. Along with the village of Ribby, it forms the civil parish Ribby-with-Wrea.

Wrea Green has approximately 1,600 residents,. Warton Aerodrome 2 miles (3.2 km) away, where BAE Systems is a major local employer. The village surrounds the largest village green in Lancashire, at one side of which is a duck pond, known locally as 'The Dub'.

Wrea Green has won "Lancashire's Best Kept Village" award 14 times.

== History ==
A part of the village of Wrea Green existed at the time of the Domesday Book, with the name of Rigbi.

Between 1846 and 1961, the village was served by Wrea Green railway station. In 1897 Wrea Green suffered a plague of sparrows and the Parish Council agreed to pay a halfpenny for every sparrow, sparrow's egg or rat's tail that was collected.

The property at the northern end of Church Row was for many years the office of J. Wareing & Son, a long established farm-building construction company but before this was a sub-branch of the District Bank.

The village surrounds the largest village green in Lancashire, at one side of which is a duck pond, known locally as 'The Dub'.

== Religion ==
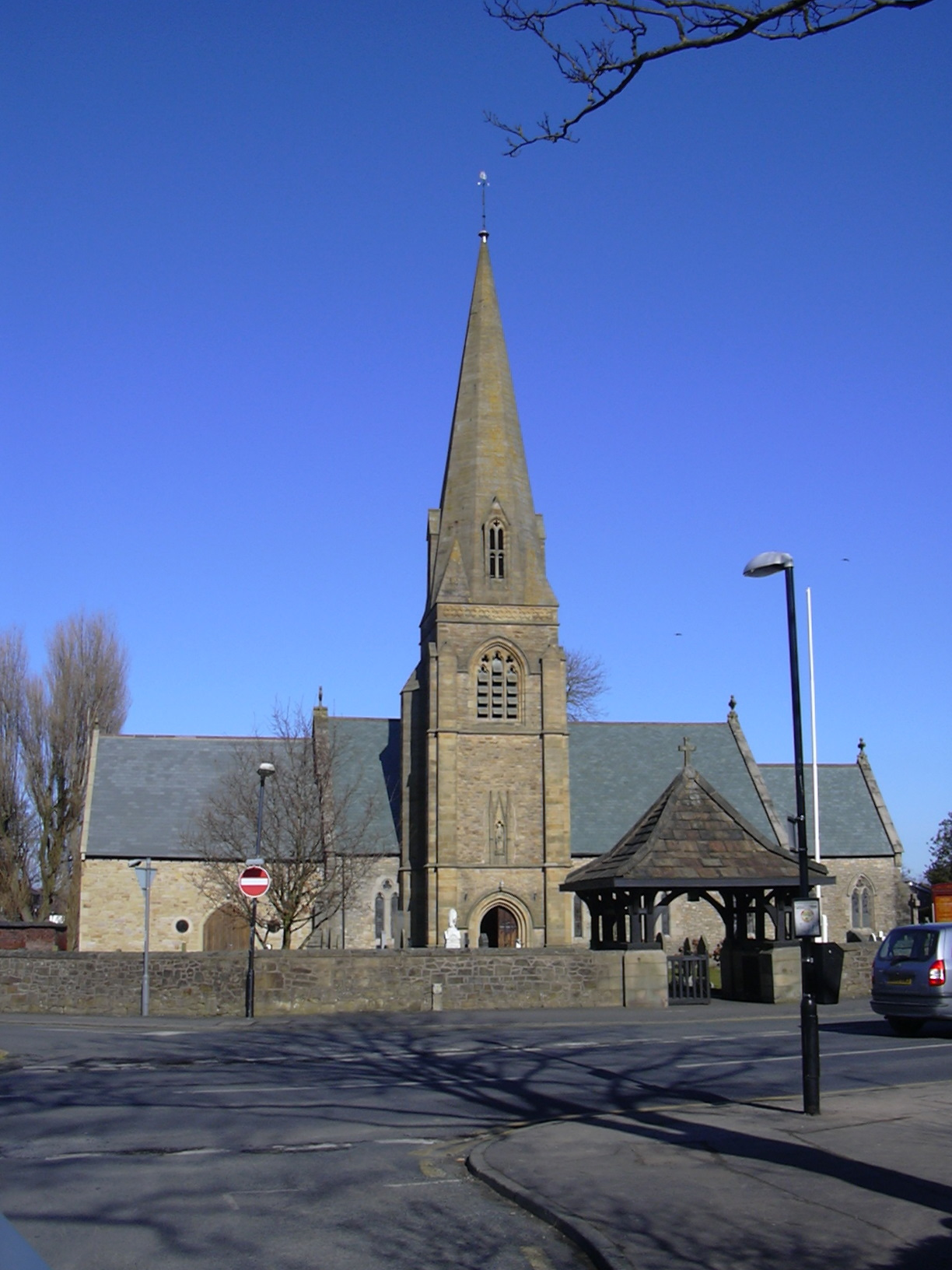
St Nicholas Church, from the south

The large Grade II listed Anglican parish church is dedicated to Saint Nicholas. The original small church on the site was licensed for services in 1722 and was consecrated by the Bishop of Chester in 1755. This was eventually demolished and on 13 May 1848 the new vicar, G. L. Parsons, laid the foundation stone for the present structure.

It was rebuilt in 1848–1849 by the Lancaster architects Sharpe and Paley. In 1884 the tower and spire were added by the successors in the same practice, Paley and Austin.

The church is active, has regular weekly services and is a popular wedding venue. An extension was built in the late 2000s.

== Local businesses ==
The village has a few small businesses and eating places. These include an artificial grass supplier and installer, a hair salon, a construction design services consultancy, a pub, a holiday hotel, sports and conference centre, a tearoom, a Thai restaurant, a shop with post office, a hotel with restaurant and a dentist. There is also the Wrea Green Institute, a members club with a community room. Agricultural construction company J. Wareing & Son has now relocated from the village centre and the site has been re-used for a small development of detached houses.

The village pub, The Grapes, dates from the 19th century and was previously known as The Letters Inn and The Dumplings Inn.

== Community events ==
Wrea Green Field Day, or Club Day, is a large festival held in Wrea Green including a fancy-dress parade, special event, a three-day visit by a large travelling fair and special stalls on the village green. Local children/teenagers are involved in the parade around the Green and the highlight of the day is the de-crowning of the previous Queen, the "Retiring Queen" (from the year before) and the crowning of a new Queen, the "Rose Queen". People with some local prominence usually crown the Queens, for example, the head teacher of the primary school in 2006 etc.

Wrea Green has won "Lancashire's Best Kept Village" award 15 times.

== Education ==
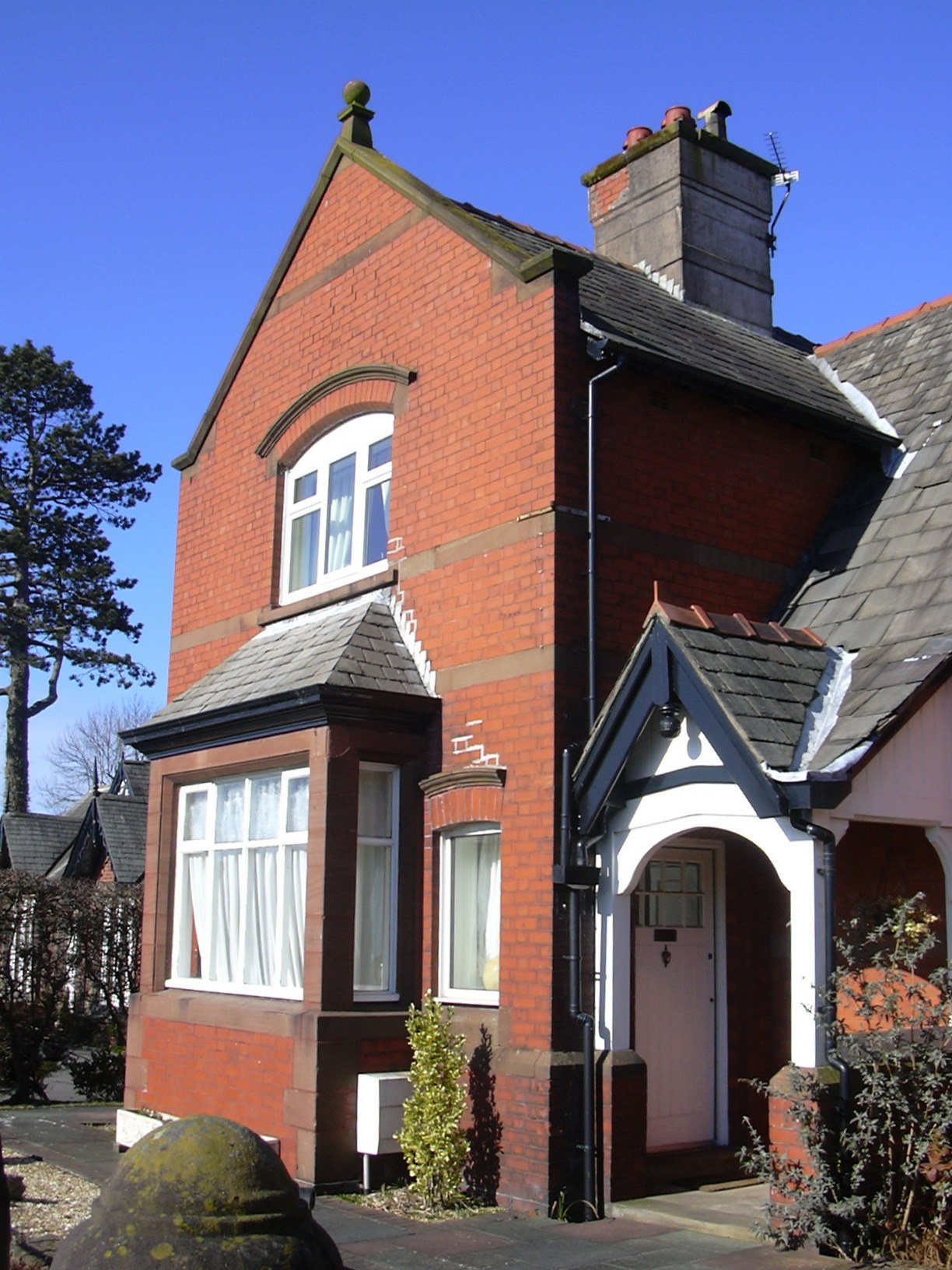
School House

The school (Ribby-with-Wrea Endowed C.E.) was founded by James Thistleton in 1693. A second school was founded by Nicholas Sharples in 1715. The two trusts were united in 1750. It moved to the current site in 1845, when the church of St Nicholas replaced the Sharples school. The present building, now a primary school, dates from 1893 though it has been expanded.

== Twin towns ==
Since November 2005 the village has been twinned the small picturesque French village of Saint-Bris-le-Vineux in Burgundy. A delegation of Wrea Green residents travelled to St Bris to make the twinning official, but the first large exchange came when, at Easter 2006, 43 French people came to stay in Wrea Green. After the major success of July 2007's trip to France by 40 Wrea Green residents, a return exchange took place in August 2008, when a similar number of French guests came to the UK.

== See also ==
- Listed buildings in Ribby-with-Wrea
