= Ince Hall =

Coordinates: 53.2859°N 2.8330°W

Ince Hall was a country house near Ellesmere Port, Cheshire, England. It stood in the grounds of the ruined Stanlow Abbey. It was a house in Italianate style that was extended by the Lancaster firm of architects Sharpe and Paley in 1849. The extension cost at least £7,448 (equivalent to £980,000 in 2023). At this time it was occupied by Eliza Jane Waldegrave, daughter of the architect Edmund Sharpe's godfather Edmund Yates. The hall was demolished in the middle of the 20th century, and its site is now occupied by the Stanlow Refinery.

During the second world war Ince Hall was used by the Shell Oil company to house operations which had been evacuated from London. This included a team working on Operation Pluto ("pipelines under the ocean"), a project to supply fuel to the Allies after the 1944 Normandy landings.
