= The Wheatsheaf, St Helens =

Pub in St. Helens, Merseyside, England

Coordinates: 53.428249°N 2.711021°W

The Wheatsheaf is a public house at Mill Lane, St Helens, Merseyside WA9 4HN, England. It was built in 1936–1938 by the brewery Greenall Whitley & Co. Ltd of Warrington, to a design by the architect W. A. Hartley.

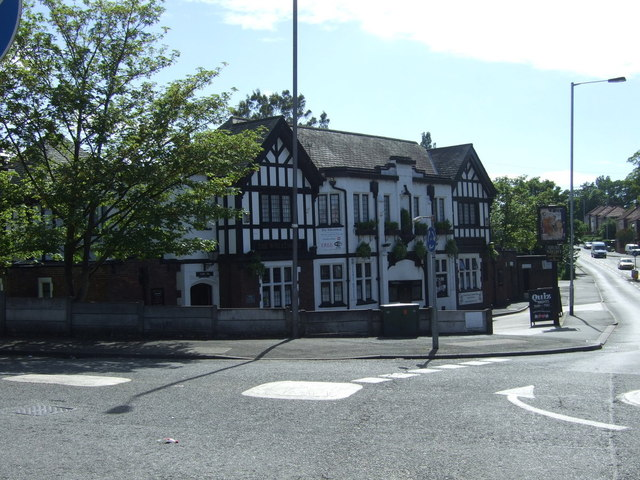
The Wheatsheaf

The building was Grade II listed in 2015 by Historic England as part of a drive to protect some of the country's best interwar pubs. The building was described as an example of "Brewers' Tudor", a type of Tudor Revival architecture. It is also included in CAMRA's National Inventory of Historic Pub Interiors.

The pub was built as part of a reform movement to replace "drinking dens" with more civilized drinking. The granting of a licence for the new pub was conditional upon the surrender of the licences of three other public houses in the locality: the Crystal Palace, the Engine and Tender and the Wheatsheaf Hotel. There is a bowling green outside.

== See also ==
For similarly named pubs in London see

- The Wheatsheaf, Fitzrovia
- The Wheatsheaf, Southwark
